= Shreveport, Louisiana =

Shreveport
- City
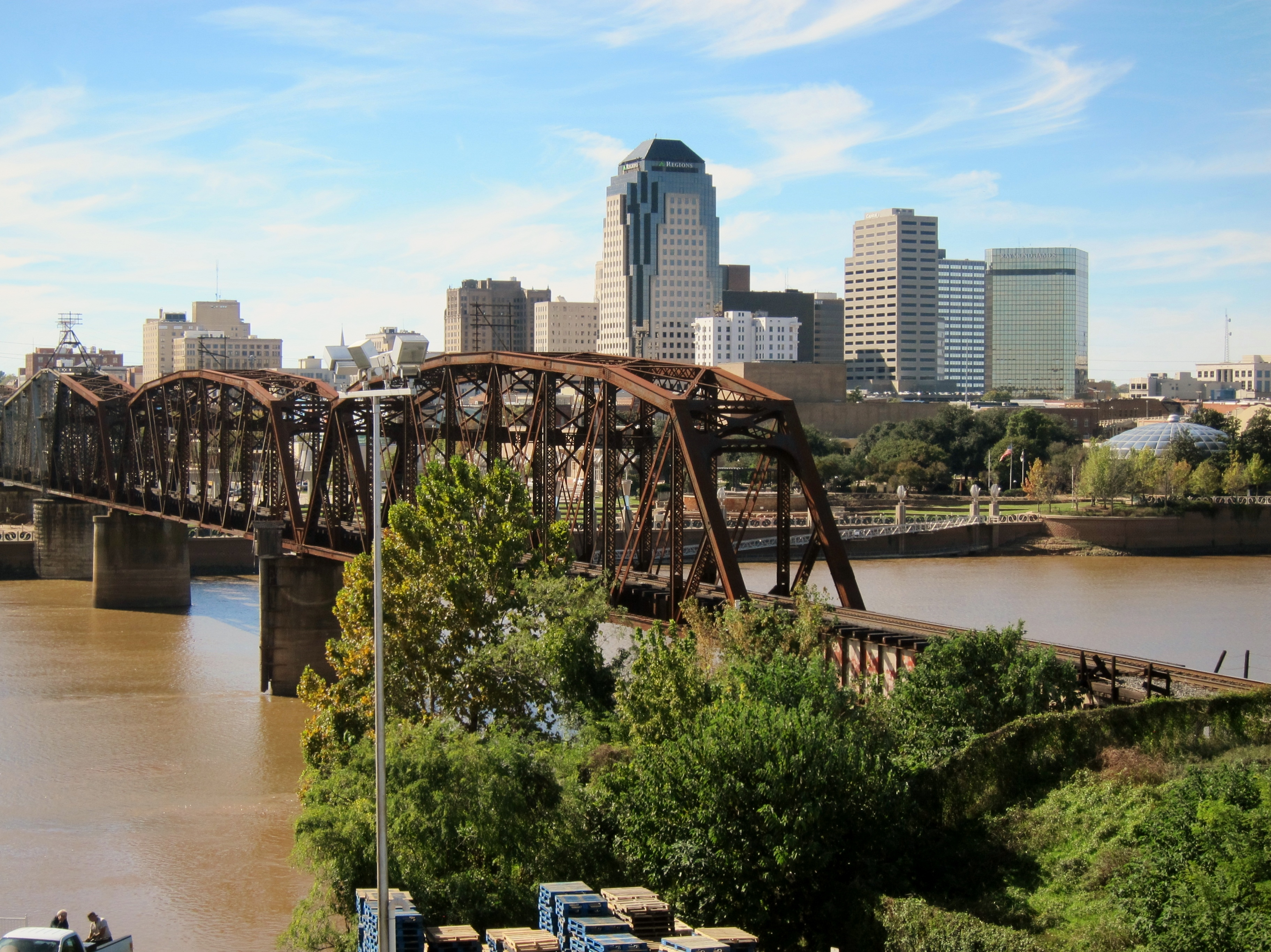
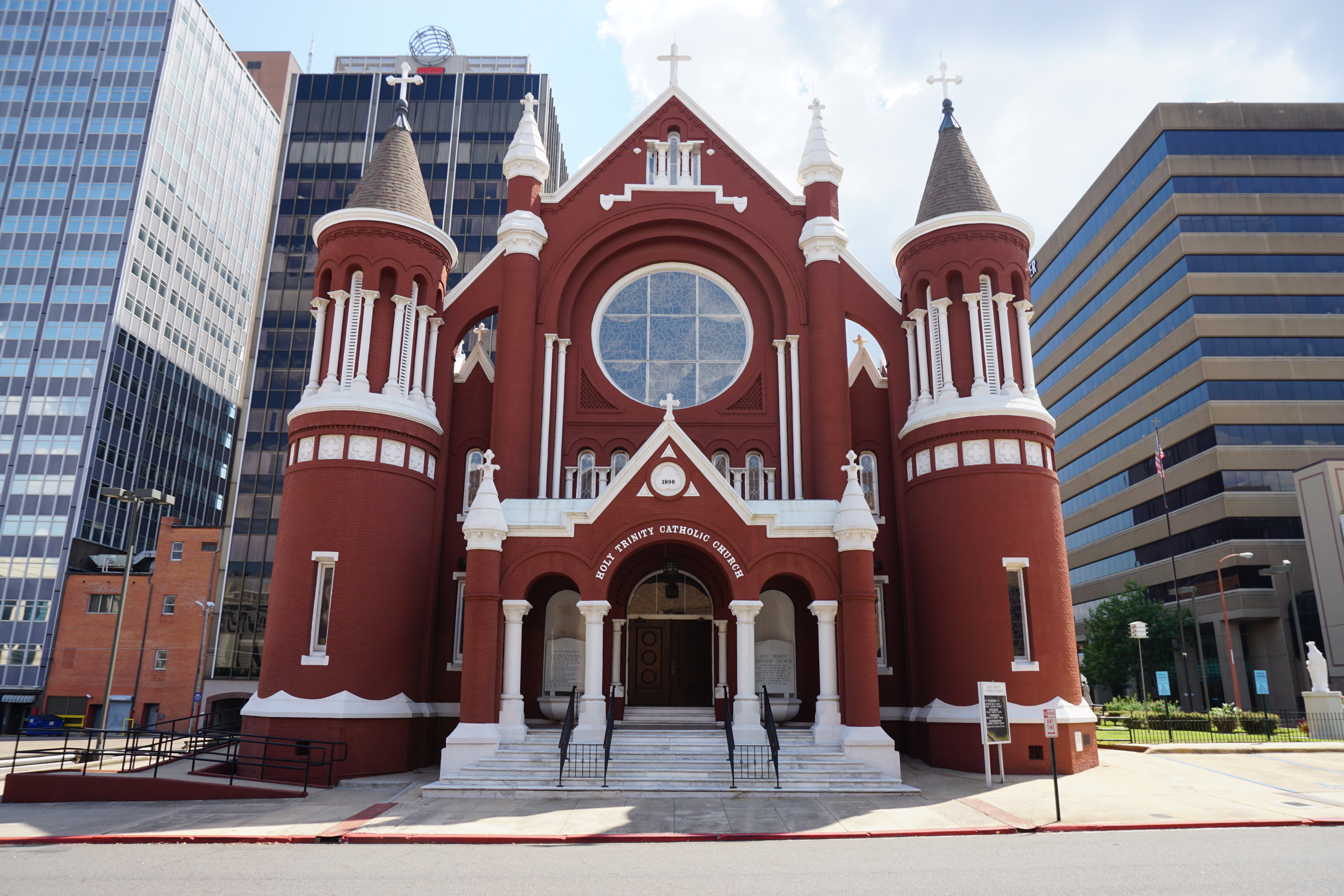
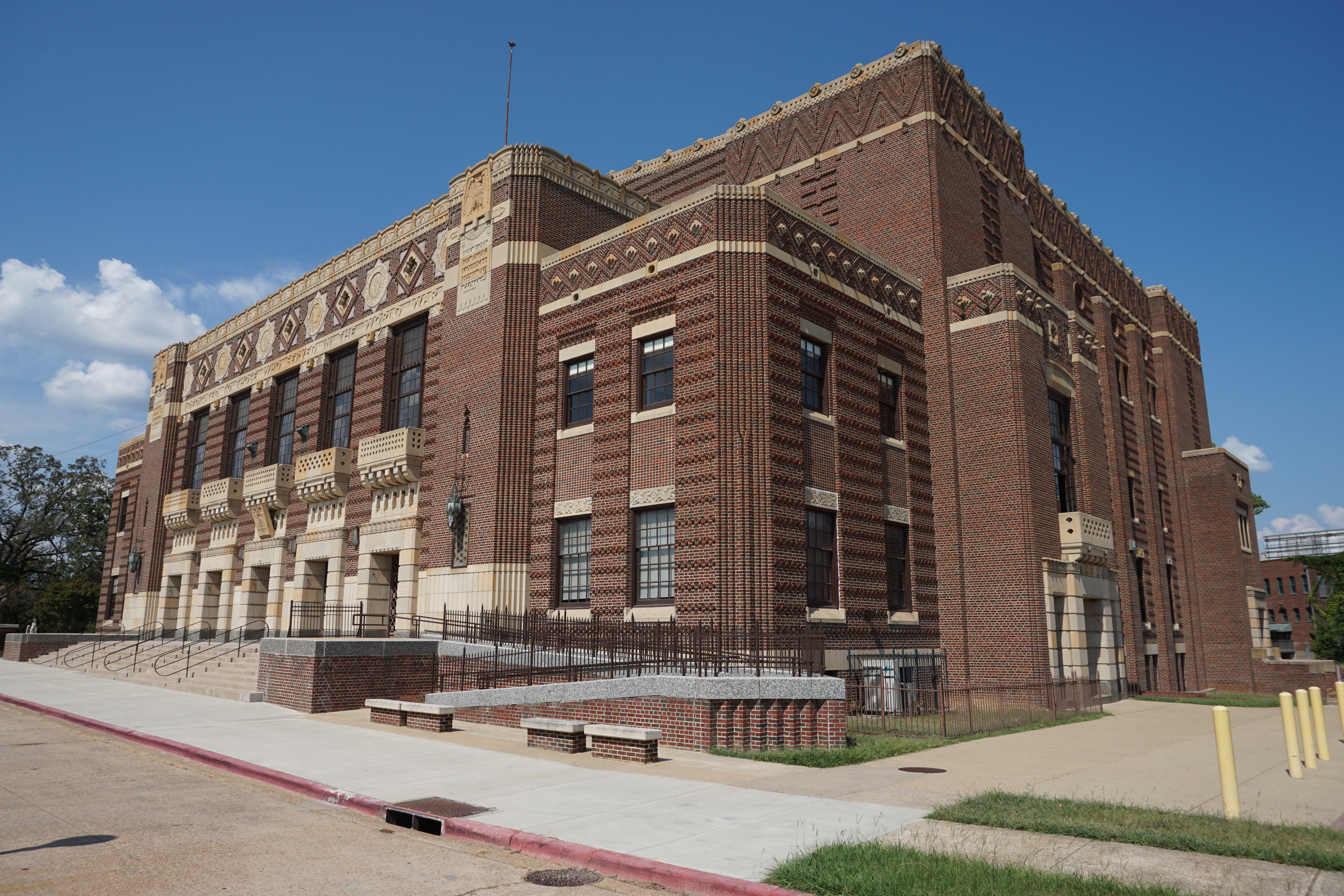
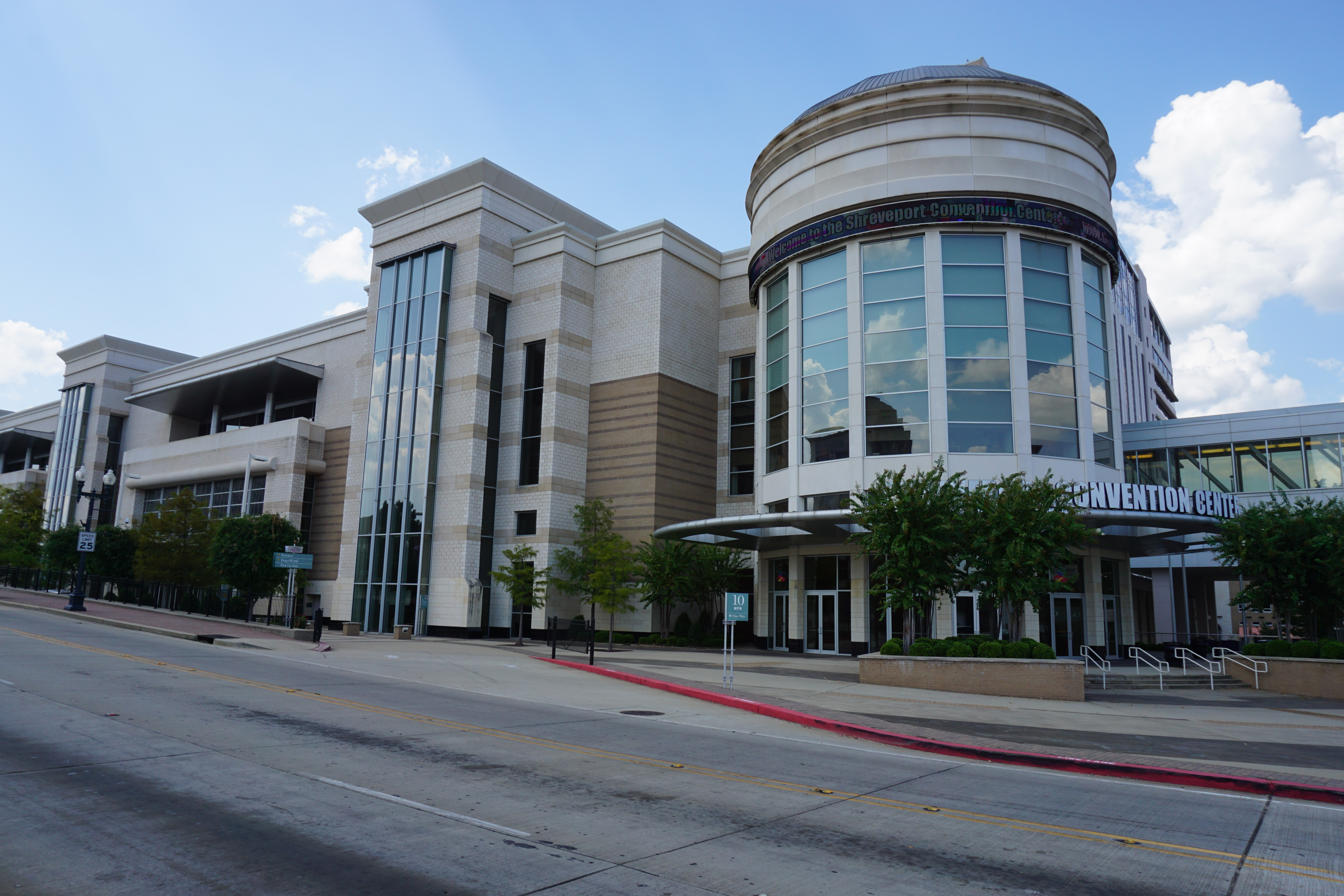
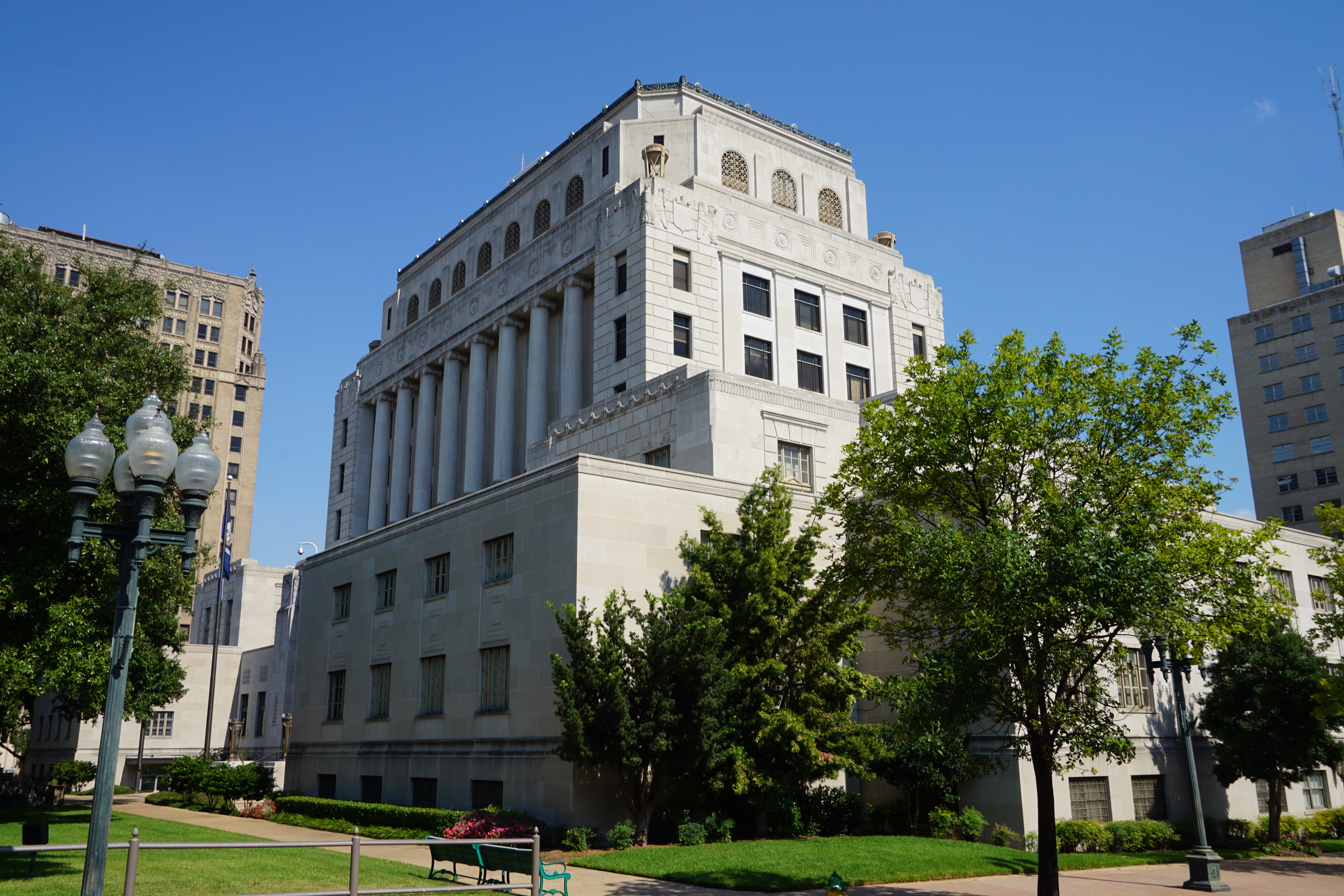
- Downtown Holy Trinity Catholic Church Shreveport Municipal Memorial Auditorium Shreveport Convention Center Caddo Parish Courthouse

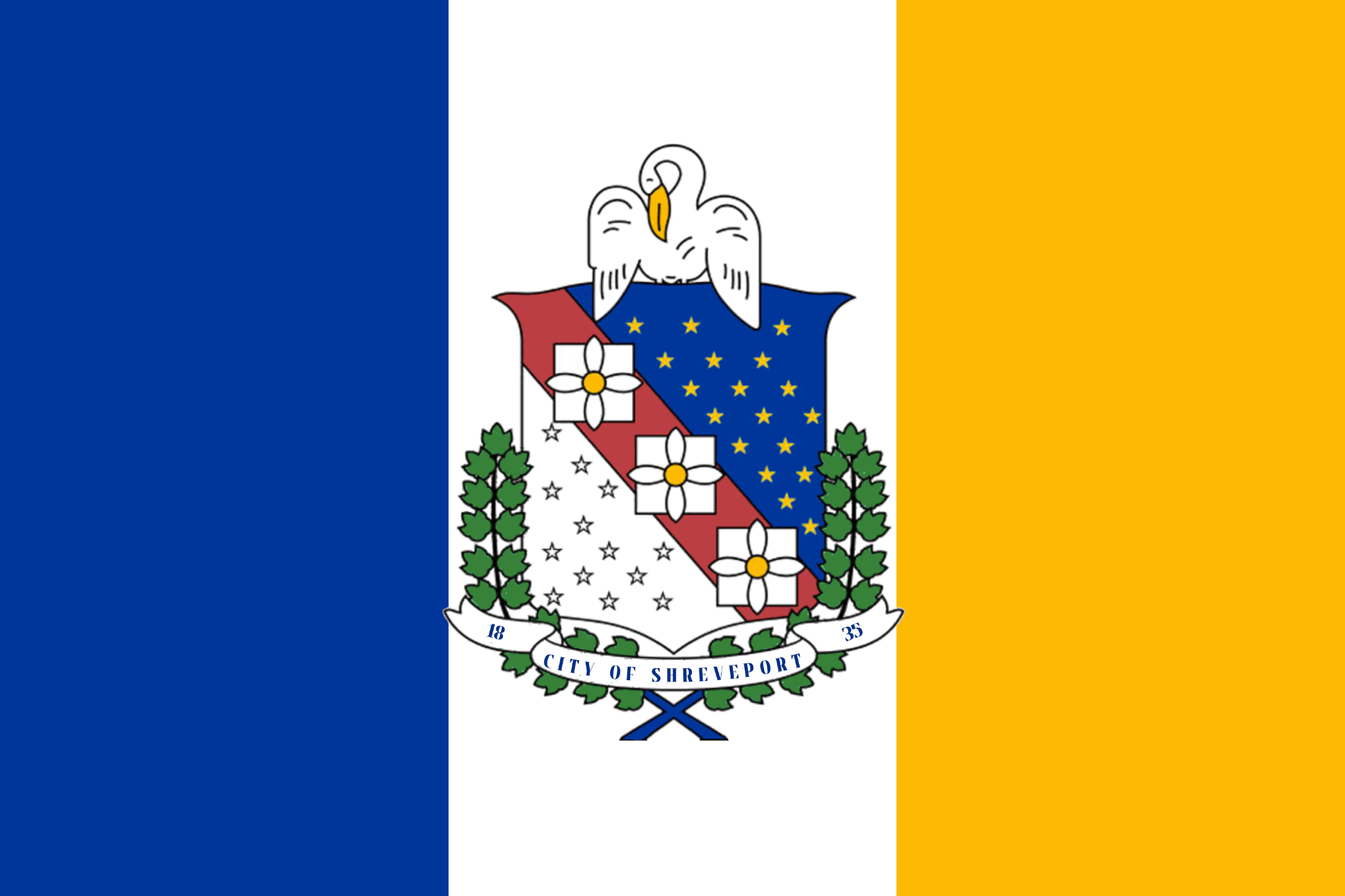
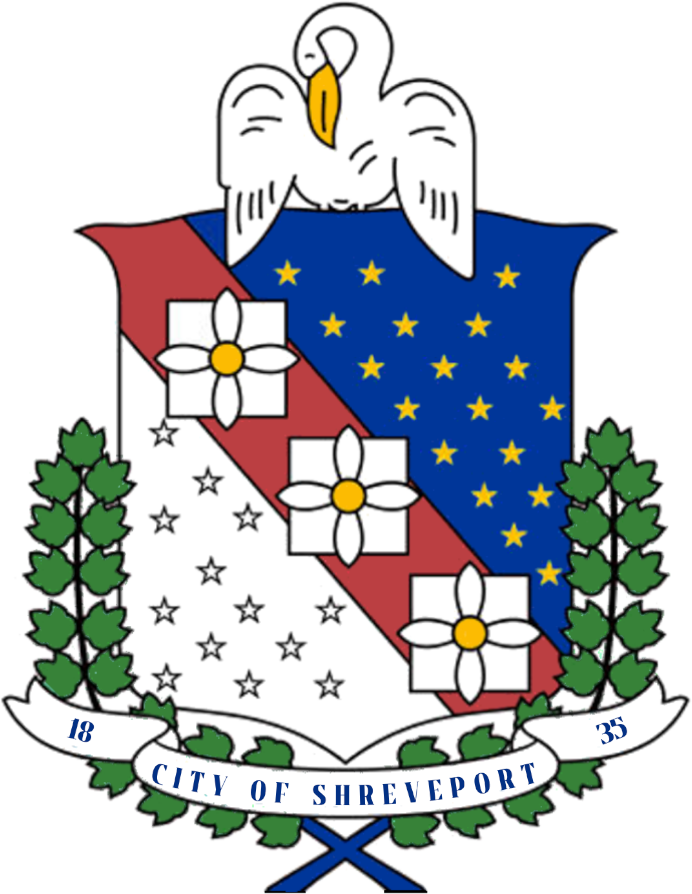
- Flag Seal Coat of arms
- Interactive map of Shreveport
- Location within Louisiana Location within the United States
- Coordinates: 32°27′50″N 93°47′40″W
- Country: United States
- State: Louisiana
- Parishes: Caddo, Bossier
- Founded: 1836 (190 years ago)
- Incorporated: March 20, 1839 (187 years ago)
- Named for: Captain Henry Miller Shreve

Government
  - Mayor: Tom Arceneaux (R)
  - City Council: Members list: Chair: James Green (D); Dist A: Tabatha Taylor (D); Dist B: Gary Brooks (D); Dist C: Jim Taliaferro (R); Dist D: Grayson Boucher (R); Dist E: Alan Jackson Jr (R); Dist F: James E. Green (D); Dist G: Ursula Bowman (D)

Area
  - City: 123.84 sq mi (320.74 km^{2})
  - Land: 108.15 sq mi (280.10 km^{2})
  - Water: 15.70 sq mi (40.65 km^{2})
  - Metro: 2,698.0 sq mi (6,987.8 km^{2})
- Elevation: 236 ft (72 m)

Population (2020)
  - City: 187,593
  - Estimate (2024): 176,578 ▼
  - Rank: 1st in Caddo Parish; 3rd in Louisiana; 153rd in United States
  - Density: 1,734.6/sq mi (669.75/km^{2})
  - Urban: 288,052 (US: 140th)
  - Urban density: 1,590/sq mi (615/km^{2})
  - Metro: 547,406 (US: 140th)
- Demonym: Shreveporter
- Time zone: UTC−6 (CST)
  - Summer (DST): UTC−5 (CDT)
- ZIP Codes: 71101–71109, 71115–71166
- Area code(s): 318, 457
- FIPS code: 22-70000
- GNIS feature ID: 2405463
- Website: shreveportla.gov

Shreveport (/ˈʃriːvpɔːrt/ SHREEV-port) is a city in the U.S. state of Louisiana. It is the third-most populous city in Louisiana after New Orleans and Baton Rouge. The bulk of Shreveport is in Caddo Parish, of which it is the parish seat. It extends along the west bank of the Red River into neighboring Bossier Parish. The 2020 census tabulation for the city's population was 187,593, while the Shreveport–Bossier City metropolitan area had a population of 393,406.

Shreveport was founded in 1836 by the Shreve Town Company, a corporation established to develop a town at the juncture of the newly navigable Red River and the Texas Trail, an overland route into the newly independent Republic of Texas. It grew throughout the 20th century and, after the discovery of oil in Louisiana, became a national center for the oil industry. Standard Oil of Louisiana and United Gas Corporation were headquartered in the city until the 1960s and 1980s, respectively. After the loss of jobs in the oil industry, the closure of General Motors' Shreveport Operations, and other economic problems, it struggled with a declining population, poverty, drugs, and violent crime. The city continues in its efforts to revitalize its infrastructure, revive the economy through diversification, and reduce crime.

Shreveport is the educational, commercial and cultural center of the Ark-La-Tex region, where Arkansas, Louisiana, and Texas meet. It is the location of Centenary College of Louisiana, Louisiana State University Shreveport, Louisiana Tech University Shreveport, Southern University at Shreveport, and Louisiana Baptist University. It forms part of the I-20 Cyber Corridor linking Shreveport to Dallas and Atlanta. Companies with significant operations or headquarters in Shreveport are Amazon, Regions Financial Corporation, JPMorgan Chase, Sam's Town Hotel and Gambling Hall, AT&T Mobility, United Parcel Service, Walmart, SWEPCO, General Electric, UOP LLC, Calumet Specialty Products Partners, and APS Payroll.

== History ==
=== Early settlers ===
Shreveport was established to create a town at the meeting point of the Red River and the Texas Trail. The Red River was made navigable by Captain Henry Miller Shreve, who led the United States Army Corps of Engineers efforts to clear it. A 180-mile-long (290 km) stretch of intermittent natural log jam, the Great Raft, had previously obstructed passage to shipping. Shreve used a specially modified riverboat, the Heliopolis, to remove the log jam. The company and the village of Shreve Town were named in Shreve's honor.

Shreve Town was originally contained within the boundaries of a piece of land sold to the company in 1835 by the indigenous Caddo Indians. In 1838 Caddo Parish was created from the large Natchitoches Parish, and Shreve Town became its parish seat. On March 20, 1839, the town was incorporated as Shreveport. Originally, the town consisted of 64 city blocks, created by eight streets running west from the Red River and eight streets running south from Cross Bayou, one of its tributaries.

Shreveport soon became a center of steamboat commerce, carrying mostly cotton and agricultural crops from the plantations of Caddo Parish. Shreveport also had a slave market, though slave trading was not as widespread as in other parts of the state. By 1860, Shreveport had a population of 2,200 free people and 1,300 enslaved people within the city limits.

=== Civil War and Reconstruction ===
During the American Civil War, Shreveport was the capital of the Confederate state of Louisiana from 1863 to 1865, having succeeded Baton Rouge and Opelousas after each fell under Union control. The city was a Southern stronghold throughout the war and was the site of the headquarters of the Trans-Mississippi Department of the Confederate Army. Fort Albert Sidney Johnston was built on a ridge northwest of the city. Because of limited development in that area, the site is relatively undisturbed in the 21st century.

Isolated from events in the east, the Civil War continued in the Trans-Mississippi theater for several weeks after Robert E. Lee's surrender in April 1865, and the Trans-Mississippi was the last Confederate command to surrender, on May 26, 1865. "The period May 13–21, 1865, was filled with great uncertainly after soldiers learned of the surrenders of Lee and Johnston, the Good Friday assassination of President Abraham Lincoln and the rapid departure of their own generals." In the confusion there was a breakdown of military discipline and rioting by soldiers. They destroyed buildings containing service records, a loss that later made it difficult for many to gain Confederate pensions from state governments.

The Red River, opened by Shreve in the 1830s, remained navigable throughout the Civil War. But seasonal water levels got so low at one point that Union Admiral David Dixon Porter was trapped with his gunboats north of Alexandria. His engineers quickly constructed a temporary dam to raise the water level and free his fleet.

In 1873, Shreveport lost 759 citizens in an 80-day period to a yellow fever epidemic, with over 400 additional victims eventually succumbing. The total death toll from August through November was approximately 1,200. In aggregate it is estimated that about one quarter of the population of Shreveport was lost, making it one of the deadliest local epidemics in American history. About 800 were interred in a mass grave at Oakland Cemetery. Five Roman Catholic priests in the city and two religious sisters died while caring for yellow fever victims in the city.

Providence Academy was established for African American students in the city.

=== 20th century to present ===
Greenwood Cemetery was established in 1893. A number of local African American musicians became nationally famous. By the 1910s, Huddie William Ledbetter—also known as "Lead Belly", a blues singer and guitarist—was performing for Shreveport audiences in St. Paul's Bottoms, the notable red-light district of Shreveport that operated legally from 1903 to 1917. Ledbetter began to develop his own style of music after exposure to a variety of musical influences on Fannin Street, a row of saloons, brothels, and dance halls in the Bottoms. Bluesmen Jesse Thomas, Dave Alexander, and Kenny Wayne Shepherd, and the early jazz and ragtime composers Bill Wray and Willian Christopher O'Hare were all from Shreveport. Lead Belly achieved international fame.

By 1914, neglect and lack of use, due to diversion of freight traffic to railroad lines, resulted in the Red River becoming unnavigable. In projects accomplished over decades, in 1994, the United States Army Corps of Engineers restored navigability by completion of a series of federally funded lock-and-dam structures and a navigation channel.

As early as 1924, the citizens of Shreveport became interested in hosting a military flying field. In 1926, Shreveport citizens learned that the 3rd Attack Wing stationed at Fort Crockett, Texas, would be enlarged by 500 percent and would require at least 20,000 acres (81 km^{2}) to support aerial gunnery and a bombing range. The efforts to procure the government's commitment to build the facility in the Greater Shreveport metropolitan area resulted in today's Barksdale Air Force Base.

In September, 1941, the capture of the city of Shreveport was the objective of a U.S. Army war game, or military exercise, known as the Louisiana Maneuvers. The field exercise's mission was accomplished largely due to General George S. Patton, who commanded the mock "Blue" army's 2nd Armored Division.

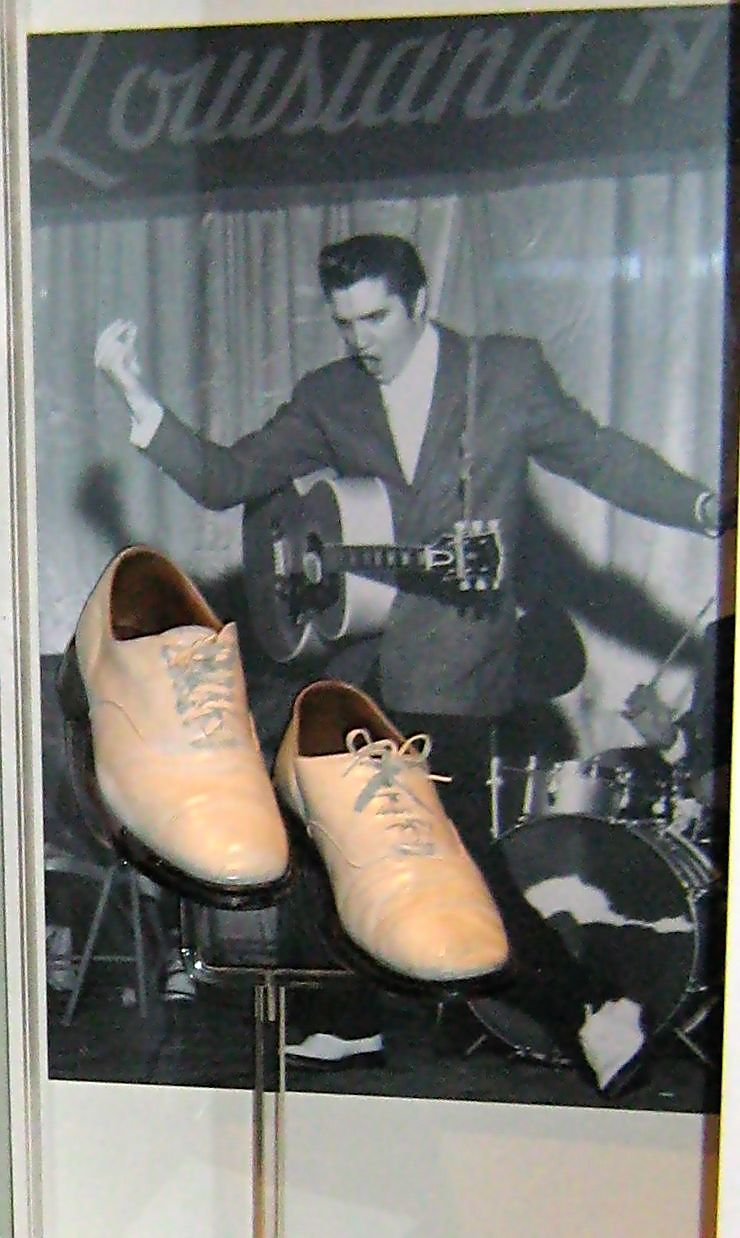
Elvis Presley at the Louisiana Hayride

Shreveport was home to the Louisiana Hayride radio program, broadcast weekly from the Shreveport Municipal Memorial Auditorium. During its heyday from 1948 to 1960, this Country music program stimulated the careers of some of the greatest figures in American music. Among them were Hank Williams and Elvis Presley, who made his broadcasting debut there in 1954. In the mid-1950s, KWKH was the first major radio station to feature the music of Presley on its long-running Louisiana Hayride program at the Shreveport Municipal Auditorium. Horace Logan, long-term KWKH program manager and originator of the Hayride, and Frank Page introduced Presley on the Hayride.

African American veterans of World War II were among activists in Shreveport through the 1960s who worked in the civil rights movement to correct injustices under Jim Crow and the disenfranchisement of blacks. While activism gradually increased, 1963 was a particularly violent year in Shreveport because of white resistance. The Shreveport home of Dr. C. O. Simpkins was bombed in retaliation for his work with Dr. Martin Luther King Jr.

In September 1963 George W. D'Artois, Public Service Commissioner, refused a permit for a march to the Little Union Baptist Church in Shreveport, where mourners gathered to honor and commemorate four black girls killed in the 16th Street Baptist Church Bombing on September 15 in Birmingham, Alabama. D'Artois and other officers entered the church on horseback and took out the pastor, Dr. Harry Blake, beating him severely.

Also in 1963, headlines across the country reported that African American musician Sam Cooke was arrested in Shreveport after his band tried to register at a "whites-only" Holiday Inn, where they planned to stay before performing in the city. Public facilities in Louisiana were still segregated. In the months following, Cooke recorded the civil rights era song, "A Change Is Gonna Come". In 1964 Congress passed the Civil Rights Act to end segregation of public facilities.

In the mid-1990s, the coming of riverboat gambling to Shreveport attracted numerous new patrons to the downtown and spurred a revitalization of the adjacent riverfront areas. Many downtown streets were given a facelift through the "Streetscape" project. Traditional brick sidewalks and crosswalks were built, and statues, sculptures, and mosaics were added to create a better pedestrian environment. The O.K. Allen Bridge, commonly known as the Texas Street bridge, was lit with neon lights. Residents predictably had a variety of reactions to these changes. Shreveport was named an All-American City in 1953, 1979, and 1999.

In the 1990s, Shreveport became known for its rap music scene, and acquired its famous aka name, Ratchet City. The term was first used by the group Lava House in its 1999 single "Ratchet".

During the September 11, 2001 attacks, President George W. Bush was taken to the nearby Barksdale Air Force Base. He also made a visit to speak in the city on March 11, 2005.

Since the downturn in the oil industry and other economic problems, the city has struggled with a declining population, unemployment, poverty, drugs and violent crime. City data from 2017 showed a dramatic increase in certain violent crimes from the previous year, including a 138 percent increase in homicides, a 21 percent increase in forcible rapes and more than 130 percent increases in both business armed robberies and business burglaries. In 2018 the local government and police authorities reported a crime drop in most categories; it was part of an overall reduction in crime since the late 20th century. As Shreveport continued its economic resurgence, the Adrian Perkins administration saw the coming of Advanced Aero Services, Tomakk Glass Partners, and the revitalization plan of the Shreveport Economic Recovery Task Force after the Cross Bayou redevelopment plan was rejected.

In June 2020, rapper Hurricane Chris was arrested in Shreveport for second-degree murder. Following the George Floyd killing in Minnesota, multiple protests were held in the city. The city experienced the largest number of homicides in its recorded history in 2021, eclipsing the previous record set in 1993.

On Sunday, April 19, 2026, a man opened fire at three homes in Shreveport, leaving eight children dead and two women injured. It is the deadliest mass shooting in the United States since the 2024 Joliet shootings.

== Geography ==
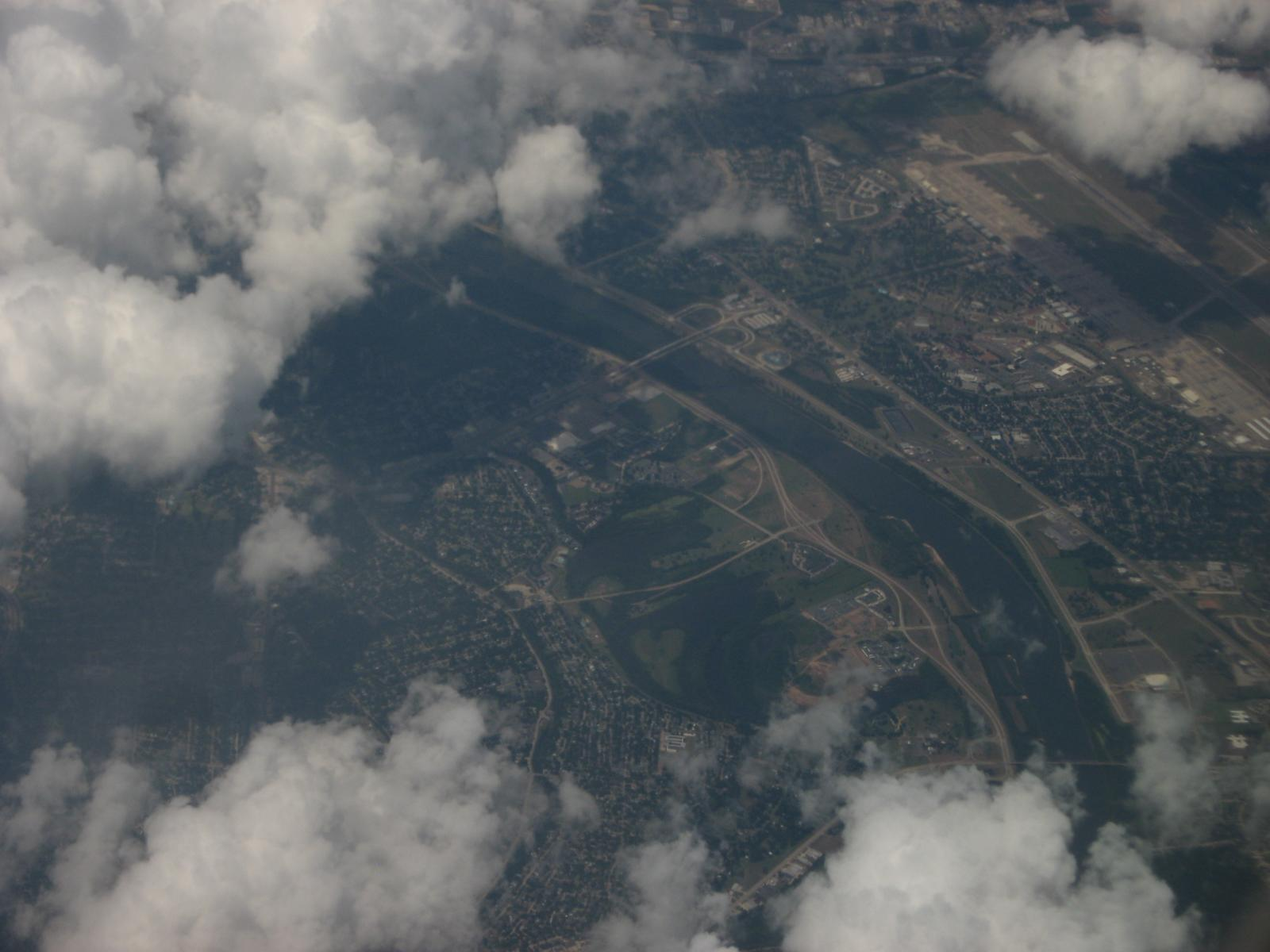
Red River between Shreveport and Bossier City with Barksdale Air Force Base in background, 2008

Shreveport is located in Northwest Louisiana. It is the center of the Ark-La-Tex region where Arkansas, Louisiana, and Texas meet. It is also part of the I-20 Cyber Corridor linking the tech-centered Dallas–Fort Worth, Shreveport–Bossier, Greater Monroe, and Greater Atlanta metropolitan areas together. The city of Shreveport is 188 miles (303 km) from Dallas, 98 miles (158 km) from Tyler, and 41 miles (66 km) from Marshall, Texas; 215 miles (346 km) from Little Rock and 73 miles (117 km) from Texarkana, Arkansas; and 250 miles (400 km) from the state capital of Baton Rouge, 99 miles (159 km) from Monroe, 69 miles (111 km) from Ruston, and 30 miles (48 km) from Minden, Louisiana. The city's proximity to the nearby cities makes it North Louisiana and the Ark-La-Tex's transportation hub.

Shreveport is the parish seat of Caddo Parish. Portions of the city extend into neighboring Bossier Parish, bordering Bossier City. Shreveport sits on a low elevation overlooking the Red River. Western and northern portions of Shreveport have an elevation over 253 feet (77 m) above sea level. Pine forests, cotton fields, wetlands, and waterways mark the outskirts of the city. According to the United States Census Bureau, the city has a total area of 123.396 square miles (319.59 km^{2}), of which, 107.798 square miles (279.20 km^{2}) is land and 15.548 square miles (40.27 km^{2}) is water.

=== Cityscape ===
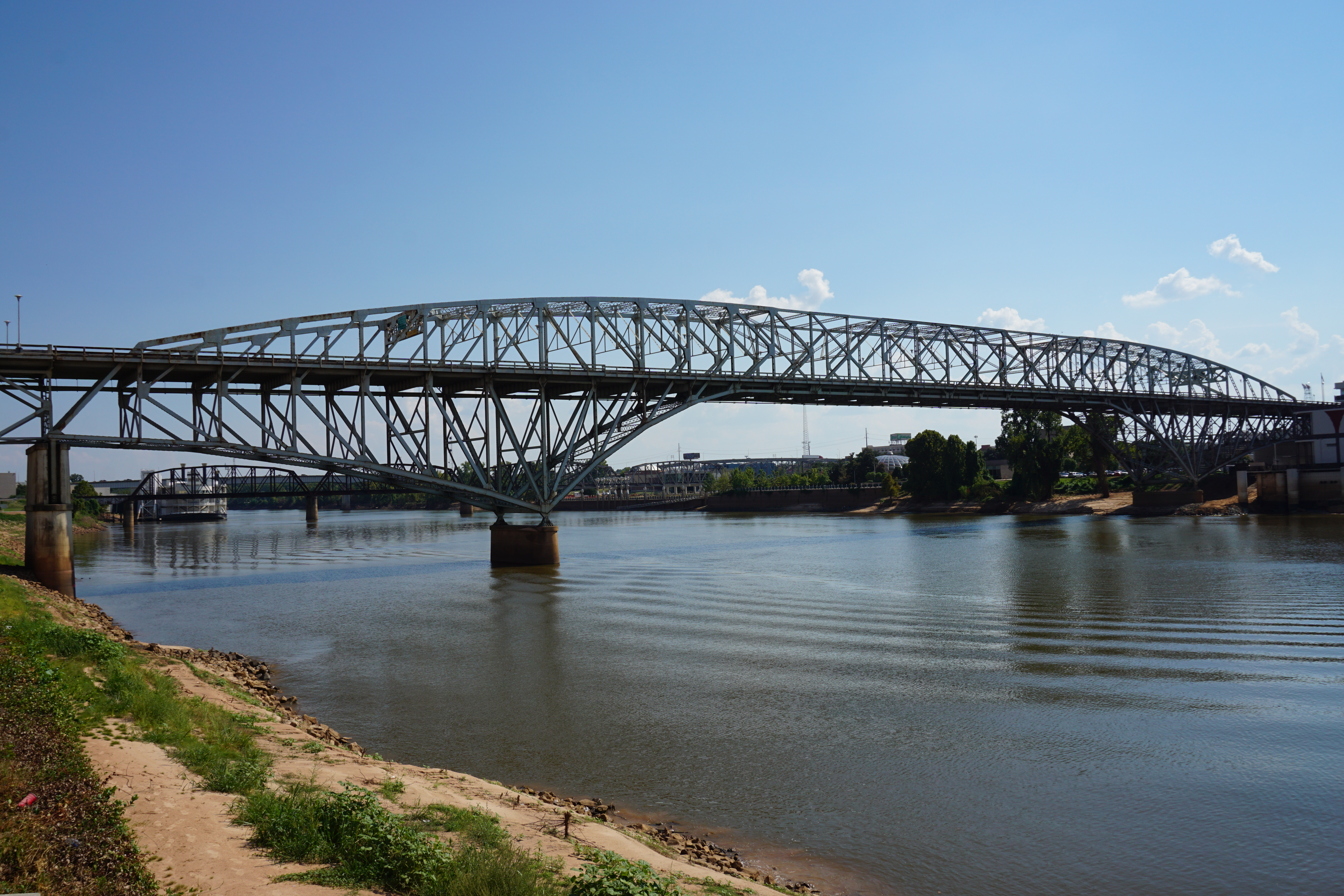
The Long-Allen Bridge (also known as the Texas Street Bridge) connects Shreveport and Bossier City.

Shreveport—since the mid-1990s—has been a major gambling center with a modest downtown skyline. The "Streetscape" project, inspired by the coming of riverboat gaming, gave Shreveport's downtown traditional brick sidewalks, statues, sculptures, and mosaics. The O.K. Allen Bridge (Texas Street bridge) was lit with neon lights. Since then, Downtown Shreveport has seen minor changes until the 2010s; the whole of Shreveport has been improving roads since the mid-2010s, with continued road projects in 2018. In 2018, buildings in Shreveport's downtown and nearby districts were revitalized due to re-investment in the area. In 2020, plans were unveiled for the I-49 Connector and further redevelopment of the city.

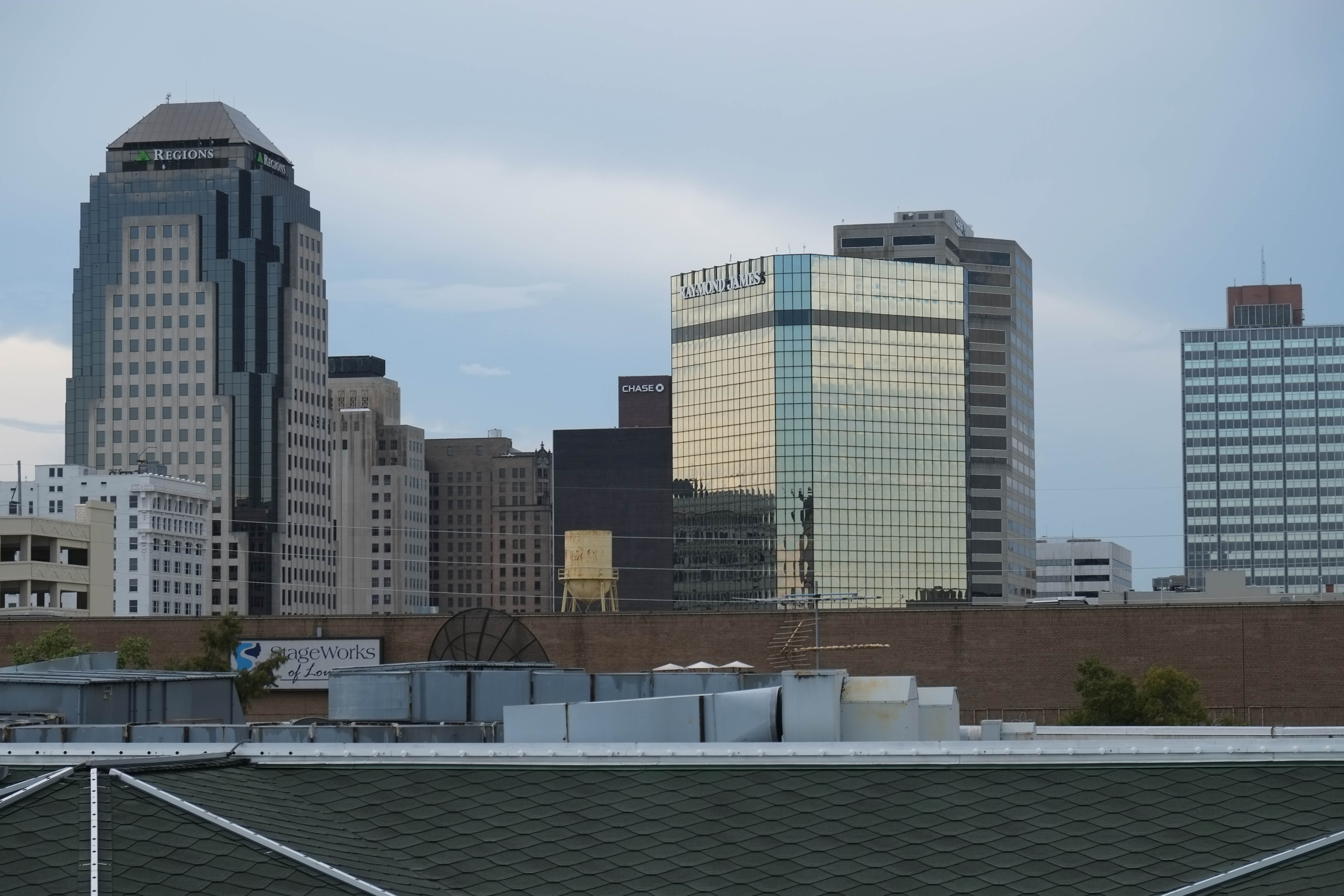
View of Downtown Shreveport

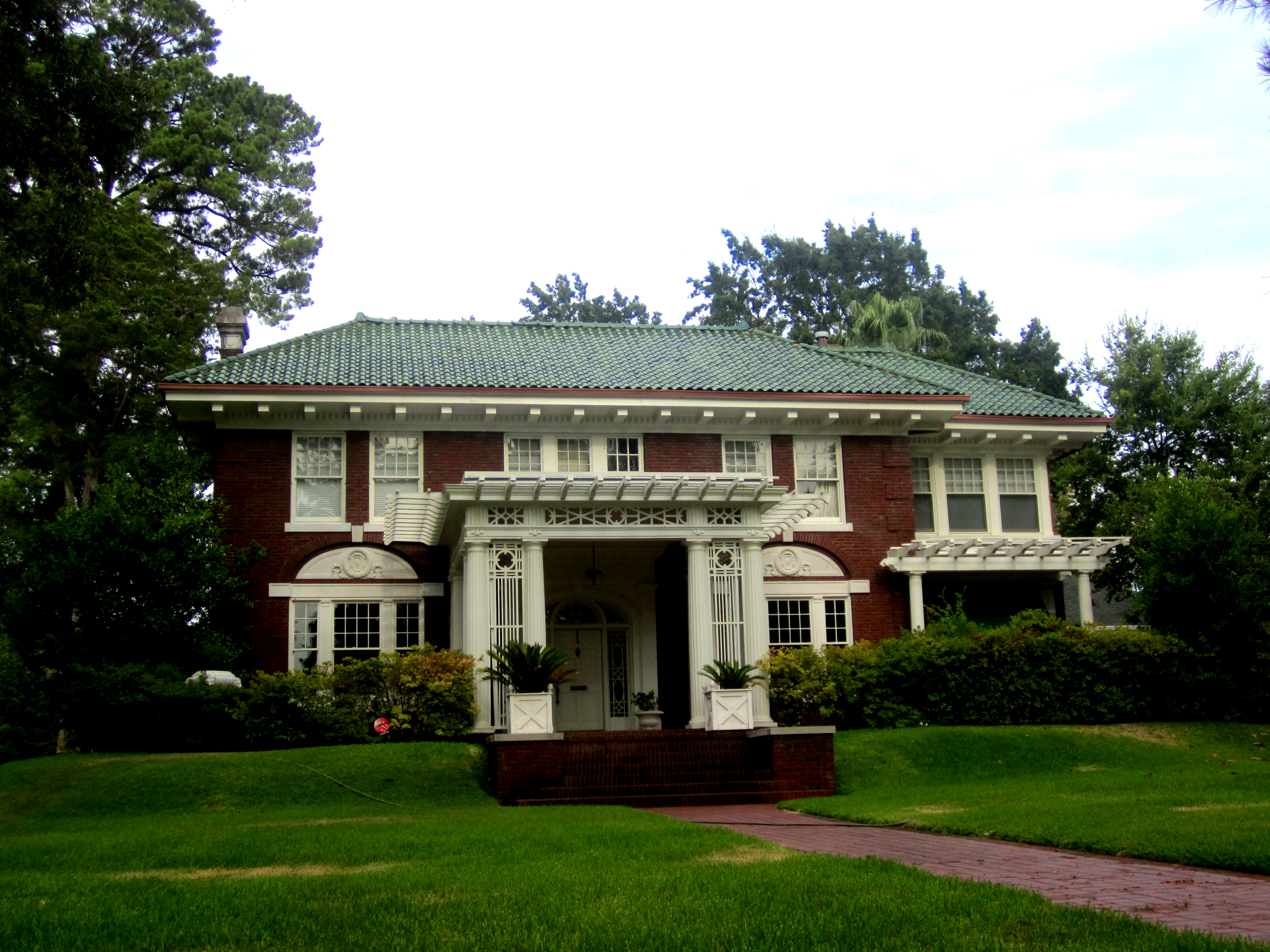
Pine Wold house (Fairfield Avenue at Kirby Street) was designed by Edward F. Neild, who created some of the designs for the interior of the White House in the Truman administration, as well as the Harry S. Truman Presidential Library and Museum. Pine Wold was constructed in 1903 by lumberman T. J. Jones and expanded in 1919 by oilman J. P. Evans. For a time the Mighty Haag Circus wintered on the grounds, and the circus elephant Trilby is buried there.

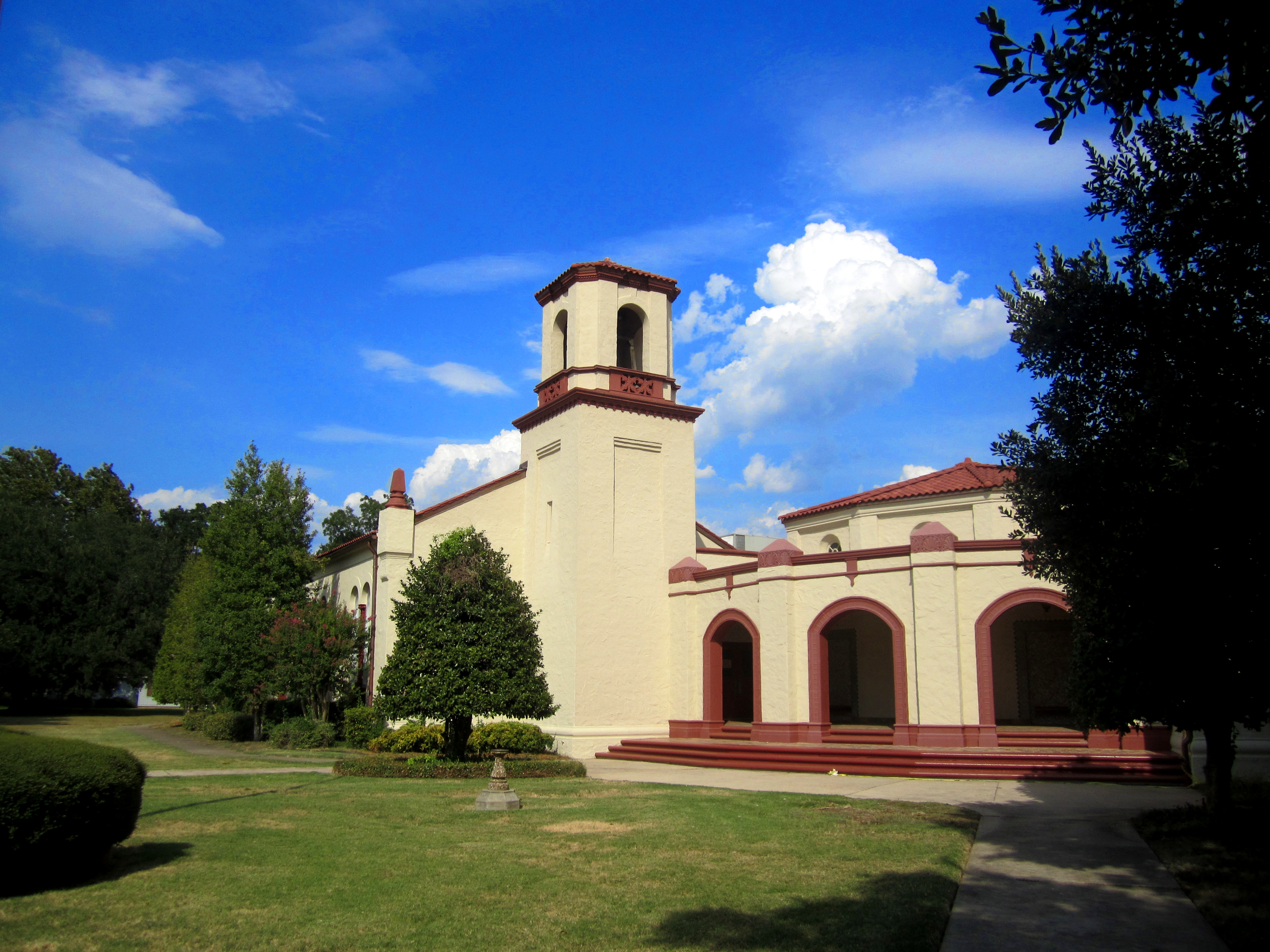
A.C. Steere School, expanded in 1938, is named for Albert Coldwell Steere, developer and founder of the Broadmoor neighborhood; the institution was added in 1991 to the National Register of Historic Places. It was designed by Edward F. Neild of Shreveport.

==== Neighborhoods ====
Shreveport encompasses many areas, neighborhoods, and districts. The busiest thoroughfares and areas of Shreveport are the Youree Drive area (named for Peter Youree), the Shreveport Downtown Riverfront, and Highland neighborhood. All of the busiest areas are located in Eastern Shreveport, nearby or along the Red River. Below is a list of areas in the Shreveport area of Caddo Parish:

- Acadiana Place
- Allendale
- Allendale-Lakeside, interloop of neighborhoods
- Anderson Island
- Azalea Gardens
- Braemar Estates
- Broadmoor
- Broadmoor Terrace
- Brunswick Place
- Caddo Heights
- Cedar Grove
- Chapel Creek
- Cherokee Park
- Cooper Road
- Crescent Wood
- Cross Lake, some not in city
- Dixie Gardens
- Eden Gardens
- Ellerbe Road Estates
- Ellerbe Woods
- Evangeline Oaks
- Fairfield Heights
- Forbing
- Fox Crossing
- Garden Valley
- Glen Iris
- Greenbrook
- The Haven
- Hidden Trace
- Hideaway Harbor
- Highland
- Hollywood
- Hollywood Heights
- Huntington
- Ingleside
- Jackson Square
- Jewella-South Park
- Hyde Park
- Lakeside
- Lakeside Acres
- Lakeside on Long Lake
- Ledbetter Heights or The Bottoms
- Long Lake Estates
- Lynbrook
- Madison Park
- Mooretown
- Norris Ferry Crossing
- Norris Ferry Estates
- Norris Ferry Landing
- North Highlands
- Parkside
- Pines Road
- Pierremont
- Pierremont Place
- Pierremont Ridge
- Provenance
- Queensborough
- St. Charles Place
- Shreve Island
- Shreve Lake Estates
- South Broadmoor
- South Highlands
- Southern Hills
- Southern Trace
- Spring Lake
- Stoner Hill
- Sunset Acres
- Towne South
- Twelve Oaks
- Shadow Pines Estates
- Steeple Chase
- Stoner Hill
- University Terrace
- Waterside
- West End
- Western Hills
- Wright Island
- Yarborough
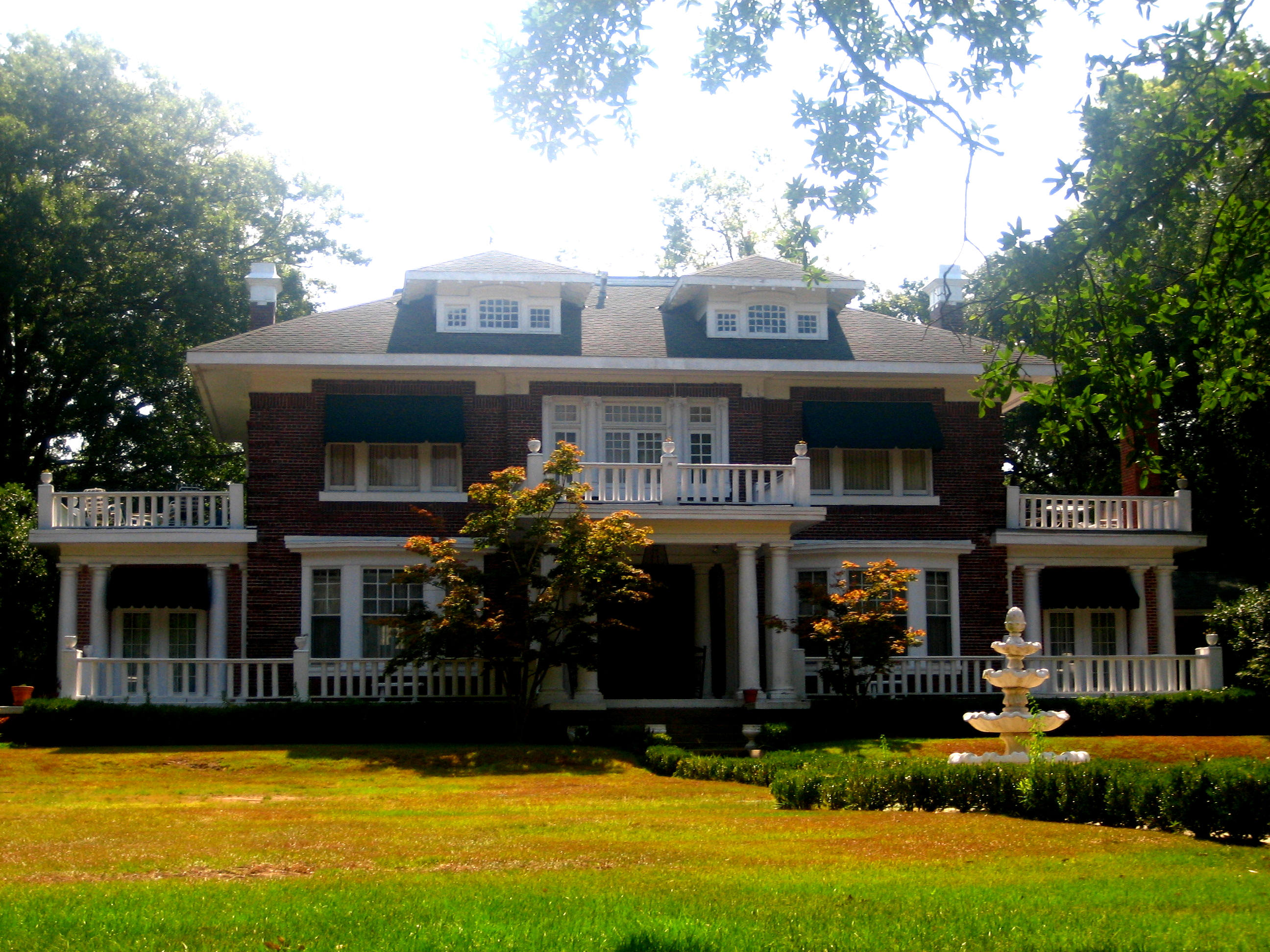
Robinson Place in Shreveport, former home of physician and developer George W. Robinson; later the residence of Douglas and Lucille Lee, owners of Lee Hardware Company

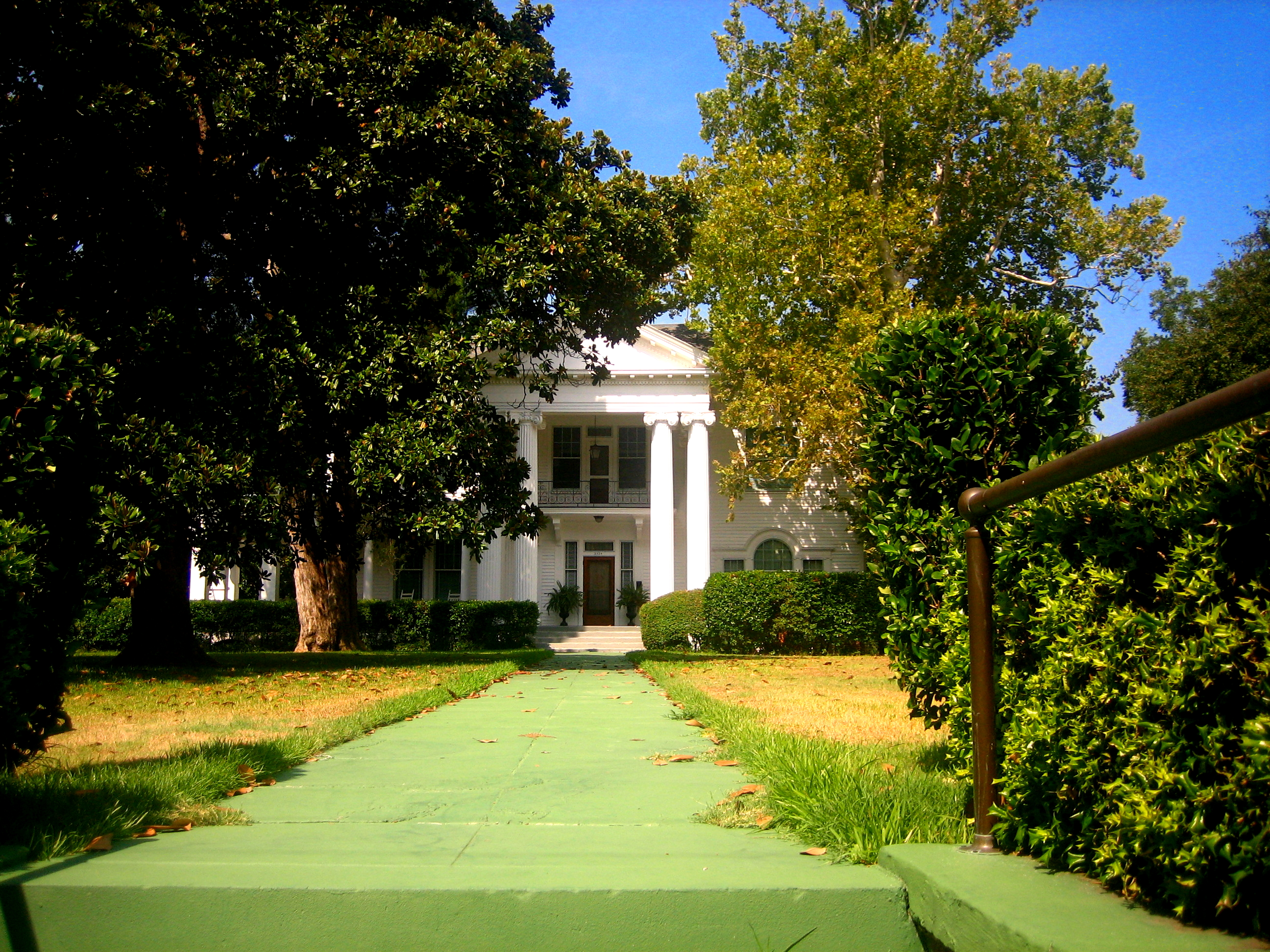
Historic residence of late Louisiana Lieutenant Governor Thomas Charles Barret at Fairfield and Prospect

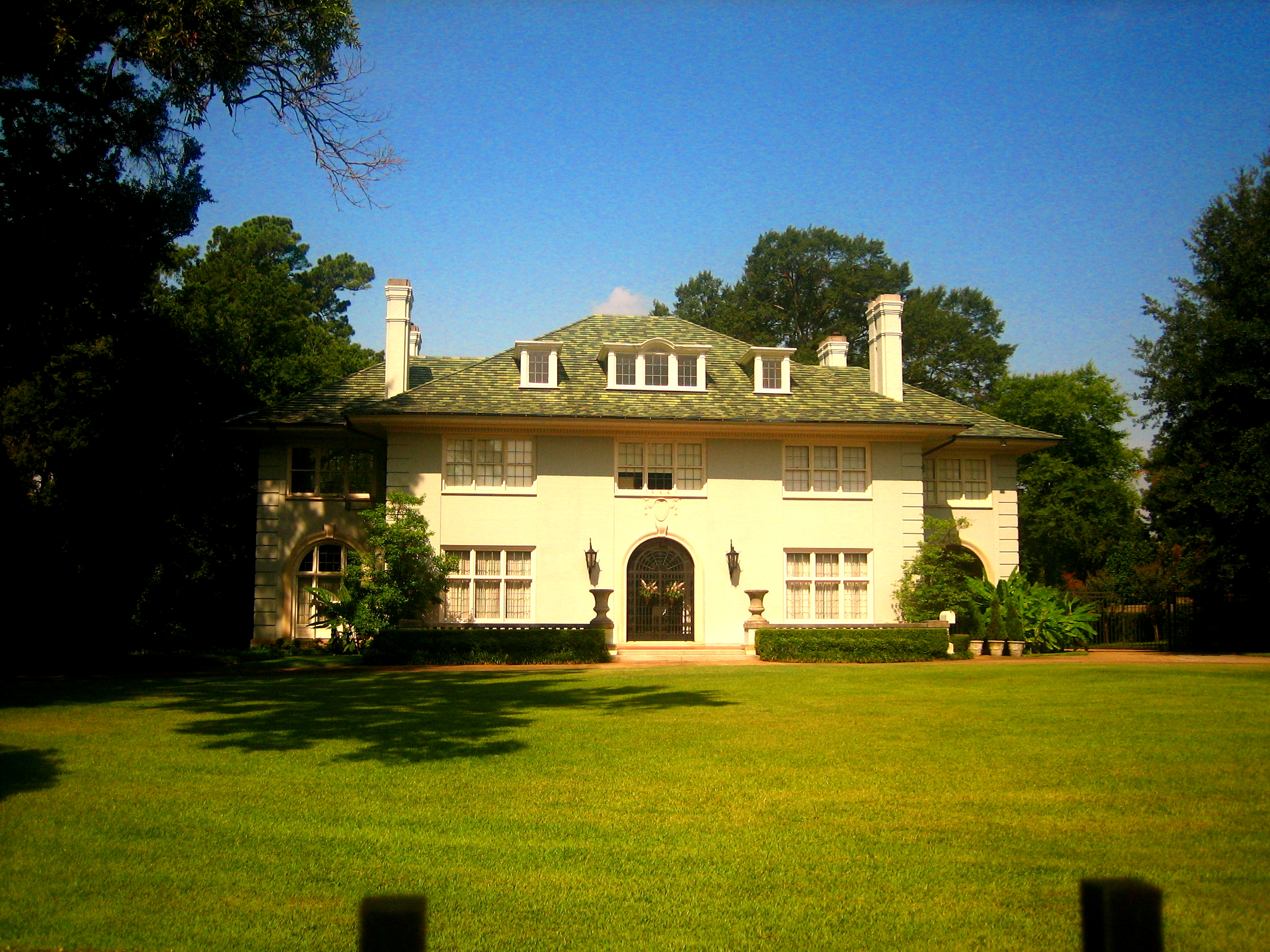
Walker House on Fairfield Avenue was once the home of the Coca-Cola bottler Zehntner Biedenharn.

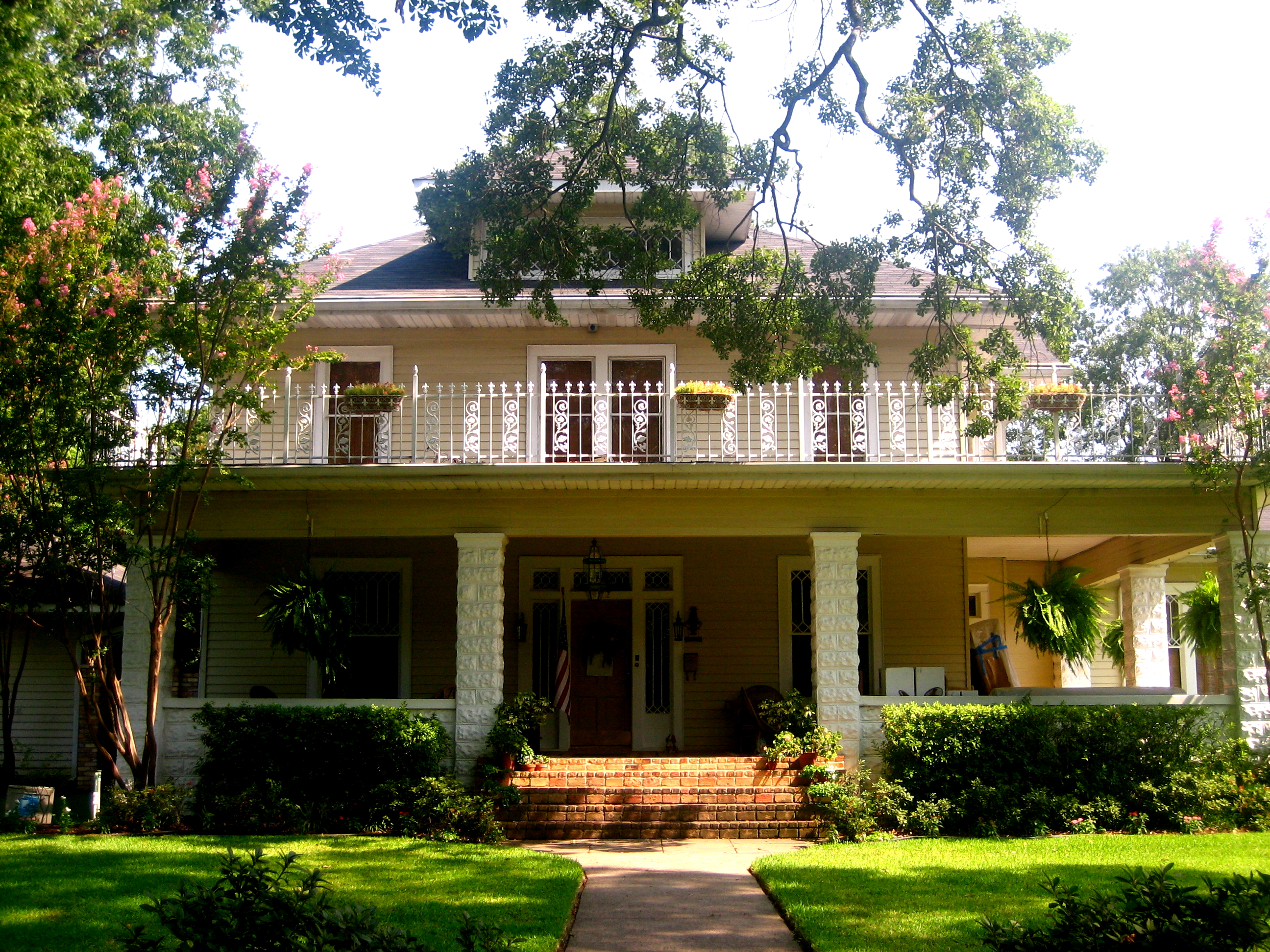
Bliss-Hoyer House, built by Abel and Nettie Bliss, was later the home of Ewald Max Hoyer, the first mayor of Bossier City, who continued to reside in Shreveport.

=== Climate ===
Shreveport has a humid subtropical climate (Köppen climate classification Cfa). Rainfall is abundant, with the normal annual precipitation averaging over 51 inches (1,300 mm), with monthly averages ranging from less than 3 inches (76 mm) in August to more than 5 inches (130 mm) in June. Severe thunderstorms with heavy rain, hail, damaging winds and tornadoes occur in the area during the spring and summer months. The winter months are normally mild, with an average of 35 days of freezing or below-freezing temperatures per year, with ice and sleet storms possible.

Summer months are hot and humid, with maximum temperatures exceeding 90 °F (32 °C) on an average of 91 days per year, with high to very high relative average humidity. The extreme temperatures range from −5 °F (−21 °C) on February 12, 1899, to 110 °F (43 °C) on August 18, 1909, and August 25 and 26, 2023. Shreveport is home to a branch of the National Weather Service which provides forecasts and warnings for the greater Ark-La-Tex region.

Climate data for Shreveport, Louisiana (Shreveport Regional Airport), 1991–2020 normals, extremes 1871–present
Month	Jan	Feb	Mar	Apr	May	Jun	Jul	Aug	Sep	Oct	Nov	Dec	Year
Record high °F (°C)	85 (29)	89 (32)	92 (33)	96 (36)	102 (39)	105 (41)	108 (42)	110 (43)	109 (43)	99 (37)	89 (32)	85 (29)	110 (43)
Mean maximum °F (°C)	76.4 (24.7)	79.1 (26.2)	84.6 (29.2)	87.5 (30.8)	92.4 (33.6)	96.3 (35.7)	100.2 (37.9)	101.4 (38.6)	98.0 (36.7)	91.3 (32.9)	82.2 (27.9)	77.4 (25.2)	102.6 (39.2)
Mean daily maximum °F (°C)	58.4 (14.7)	62.6 (17.0)	70.4 (21.3)	77.5 (25.3)	84.6 (29.2)	91.1 (32.8)	94.3 (34.6)	94.9 (34.9)	89.6 (32.0)	79.3 (26.3)	67.9 (19.9)	59.9 (15.5)	77.5 (25.3)
Daily mean °F (°C)	47.9 (8.8)	51.8 (11.0)	59.0 (15.0)	65.9 (18.8)	74.0 (23.3)	80.9 (27.2)	83.9 (28.8)	84.0 (28.9)	78.3 (25.7)	67.4 (19.7)	56.6 (13.7)	49.5 (9.7)	66.6 (19.2)
Mean daily minimum °F (°C)	37.3 (2.9)	41.0 (5.0)	47.7 (8.7)	54.3 (12.4)	63.5 (17.5)	70.6 (21.4)	73.5 (23.1)	73.0 (22.8)	67.0 (19.4)	55.4 (13.0)	45.3 (7.4)	39.0 (3.9)	55.6 (13.1)
Mean minimum °F (°C)	21.2 (−6.0)	26.3 (−3.2)	30.4 (−0.9)	38.3 (3.5)	49.6 (9.8)	62.3 (16.8)	68.0 (20.0)	65.9 (18.8)	54.3 (12.4)	39.0 (3.9)	28.8 (−1.8)	24.3 (−4.3)	19.5 (−6.9)
Record low °F (°C)	−2 (−19)	−5 (−21)	15 (−9)	31 (−1)	39 (4)	52 (11)	58 (14)	53 (12)	42 (6)	28 (−2)	16 (−9)	5 (−15)	−5 (−21)
Average precipitation inches (mm)	4.40 (112)	4.30 (109)	4.90 (124)	5.19 (132)	4.46 (113)	4.78 (121)	3.50 (89)	2.91 (74)	3.46 (88)	4.59 (117)	4.00 (102)	4.94 (125)	51.43 (1,306)
Average snowfall inches (cm)	0.2 (0.51)	0.5 (1.3)	0.1 (0.25)	0.0 (0.0)	0.0 (0.0)	0.0 (0.0)	0.0 (0.0)	0.0 (0.0)	0.0 (0.0)	0.0 (0.0)	0.0 (0.0)	0.1 (0.25)	0.9 (2.3)
Average precipitation days (≥ 0.01 in)	9.4	9.6	9.7	7.9	9.1	8.9	7.5	6.6	6.7	7.6	8.4	9.6	101.0
Average snowy days (≥ 0.1 in)	0.2	0.3	0.1	0.0	0.0	0.0	0.0	0.0	0.0	0.0	0.0	0.1	0.7
Average relative humidity (%)	72.6	69.7	67.7	69.6	73.2	73.3	72.4	71.7	73.6	71.7	73.7	74.4	72.0
Mean monthly sunshine hours	158.3	172.8	213.1	231.2	267.1	297.9	317.9	300.7	249.8	235.8	176.8	158.4	2,779.8
Percentage possible sunshine	50	56	57	59	62	70	73	73	67	67	56	51	63
Source: NOAA (sun and relative humidity 1961–1990)

== Demographics ==
Historical population
Census	Pop.	Note	%±
1850	1,728		—
1860	2,190		26.7%
1870	4,607		110.4%
1880	8,009		73.8%
1890	11,979		49.6%
1900	16,013		33.7%
1910	28,015		75.0%
1920	43,874		56.6%
1930	76,655		74.7%
1940	98,167		28.1%
1950	127,206		29.6%
1960	164,372		29.2%
1970	182,064		10.8%
1980	206,989		13.7%
1990	198,525		−4.1%
2000	200,145		0.8%
2010	199,311		−0.4%
2020	187,593		−5.9%
2025 (est.)	175,902	▼	−6.2%
U.S. Decennial Census; 2020 Census

Shreveport's population was initially 1,728 at the 1850 U.S. census, and has experienced growth to a historic high of 206,989 at the 1980 census. As of 2024, estimates by the United States Census Bureau show the population has fallen to 176,578, a decrease of 30,411 (-14.7%) since the 1980 high.

According to the 2020 United States census, there were 187,593 people, 73,114 households, and 42,775 families residing in the city; the 2020 American Community Survey determined an estimated 189,890 people resided in the city, purporting a slight population rebound. The 2020 census estimates showed Shreveport had 75,680 households with an average of 2.4 people per household. Of the households, 39% were married-couple households, though 44% of its male population and 40% of its female population have never married.

Throughout the city, there were 89,523 housing units, with an 85% occupancy rate; among them, 54% were owner-occupied. Among its units, 73% were single-unit detached homes and 31% of its population moved into those homes from 2015 to 2016. The median value of its owner-occupied housing units were $151,700, and 30% of its units were estimated to be under $100,000; 38% of its units were estimated to cost from $100,000 to $200,000. From 2014 to 2018, the median value of an owner-occupied housing unit was $144,800. The median monthly cost with a mortgage was $1,178 and the median monthly cost without a mortgage was $364; the city of Shreveport had a median gross rent of $810.

The median income from 2014 to 2018 was $36,338, and the mean income was $55,582. The per capita income was $25,022. By the 2020 American Community Survey, its median household income increased to $40,809. The median income for families grew to $54,023 with a mean income of $82,854; married-couple families $84,282 with a mean of $112,363; and non-family households $26,628 with a mean of $41,090. According to census estimates, 25% of its population earned from $50,000 to $100,000 annually; 13% $100,000 to $200,000; and 5% over $200,000. Approximately 24.9% of Shreveport lived at or below the poverty line, down from 2014 to 2018's census estimates of 25.4%.

=== Race and ethnicity ===
Shreveport city, Louisiana – Racial and ethnic composition Note: the US Census treats Hispanic/Latino as an ethnic category. This table excludes Latinos from the racial categories and assigns them to a separate category. Hispanics/Latinos may be of any race.
Race / Ethnicity (NH = Non-Hispanic)	Pop 2000	Pop 2010	Pop 2020	% 2000	% 2010	% 2020
White alone (NH)	91,857	79,693	66,138	45.90%	39.98%	35.26%
Black or African American alone (NH)	101,218	108,535	104,612	50.57%	54.46%	55.77%
Native American or Alaska Native alone (NH)	568	652	573	0.28%	0.33%	0.31%
Asian alone (NH)	1,577	2,600	3,031	0.79%	1.30%	1.62%
Native Hawaiian or Pacific Islander alone (NH)	58	89	102	0.03%	0.04%	0.05%
Other race alone (NH)	136	213	668	0.07%	0.11%	0.36%
Mixed race or Multiracial (NH)	1,625	2,511	5,811	0.81%	1.26%	3.10%
Hispanic or Latino (any race)	3,106	5,018	6,658	1.55%	2.52%	3.55%
Total	200,145	199,311	187,593	100.00%	100.00%	100.00%

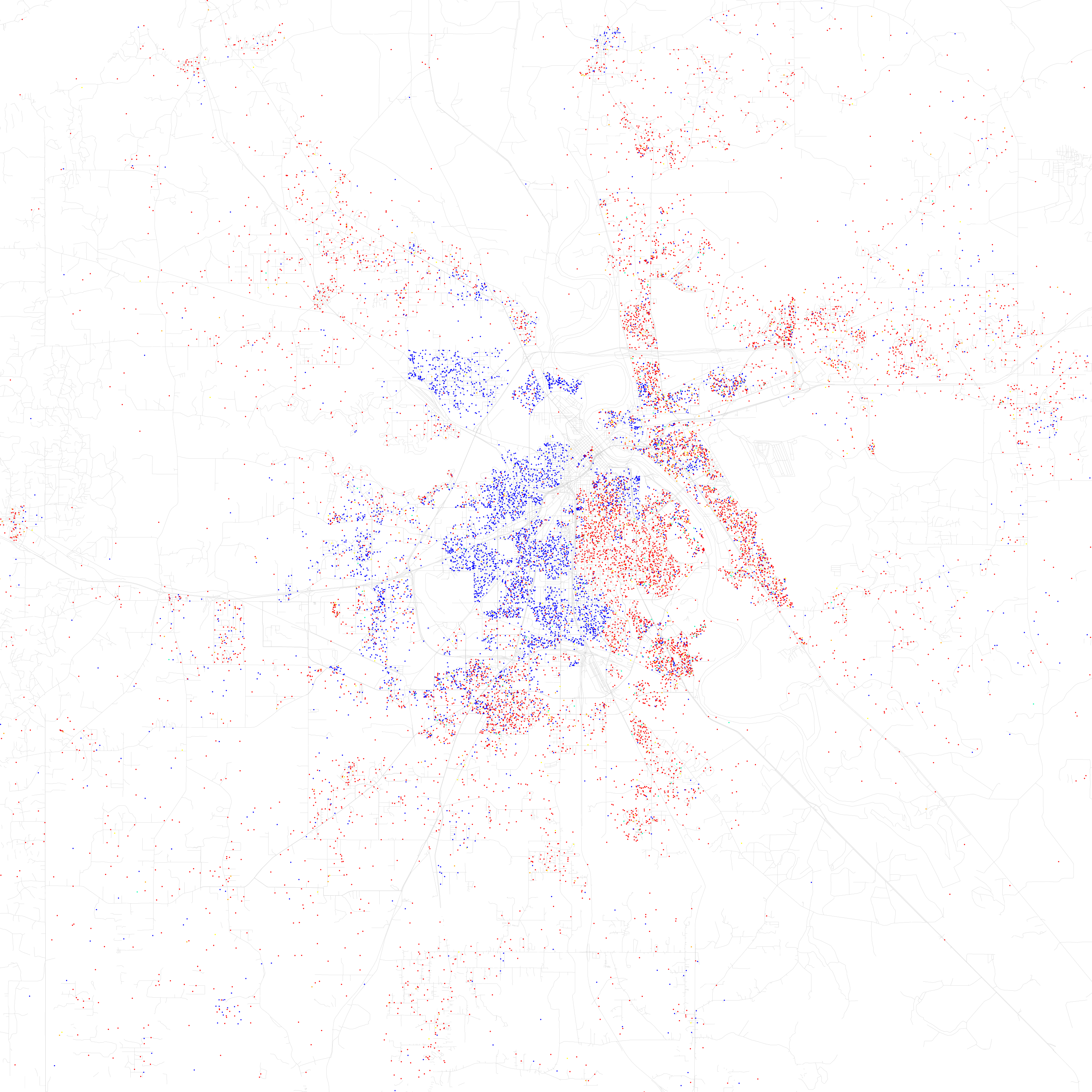
Map of racial distribution in Shreveport, 2010 U.S. census. Each dot is 25 people: White, Black, Asian, Hispanic or other (yellow).

In 2019, the racial and ethnic makeup of Shreveport was 56.9% Black and African American, 36.8% non-Hispanic white, 0.4% American Indian and Alaska Native, 1.7% Asian, 0.1% Native Hawaiian and other Pacific Islander, 0.1% some other race, 1.5% two or more races, and 2.6% Hispanic and Latino American of any race. At the 2010 U.S. census, the racial and ethnic composition of the population was 54.70% Black or African American, 41.16% White, 1.0% Native American, 2.0% Asian, 1.2% from some other race and 1.5% from two or more races. In 2010, about 6.5% of the population was Hispanic or Latino American of any race.

Reflecting the decline in North Louisiana's population, the city of Shreveport's racial and ethnic makeup among Hispanic and Latino Americans declined from 2010 yet rebounded from 2019's census estimates. At the 2020 census, Shreveport remained a predominantly Black and African American city, with 55.77% of the population identifying as such; non-Hispanic whites slightly declined to 35.26% and multiracial or Americans of another race increased to 3.45% of the population. Data from the 2020 United States census reflected growing trends of Hispanic and Latino, and Asian American population growth nationwide.

=== Religion ===
Christianity is the city and metropolitan area's dominant religion, being part of the Bible Belt. Its residents were predominantly Protestant through the nineteenth century, and today, Baptists form the majority of Christians in Shreveport, followed by Methodists and Roman Catholics. Many Baptist and Methodist churches are affiliated with evangelical Protestant denominations, though several are also affiliated with mainline Protestantism; among Baptists, the Southern Baptist Convention, National Baptist Convention (USA), National Baptist Convention of America, and Full Gospel Baptist Church Fellowship are the largest Baptist denominations in the city. The Progressive National Baptist Convention is the largest Progressive Baptist group in the area. Methodists are mainly affiliates of the African Methodist Episcopal Church or Christian Methodist Episcopal Church, though some also claimed affiliation to the mainline United Methodist Church. The Roman Catholic community is primarily served by the Roman Catholic Diocese of Shreveport.

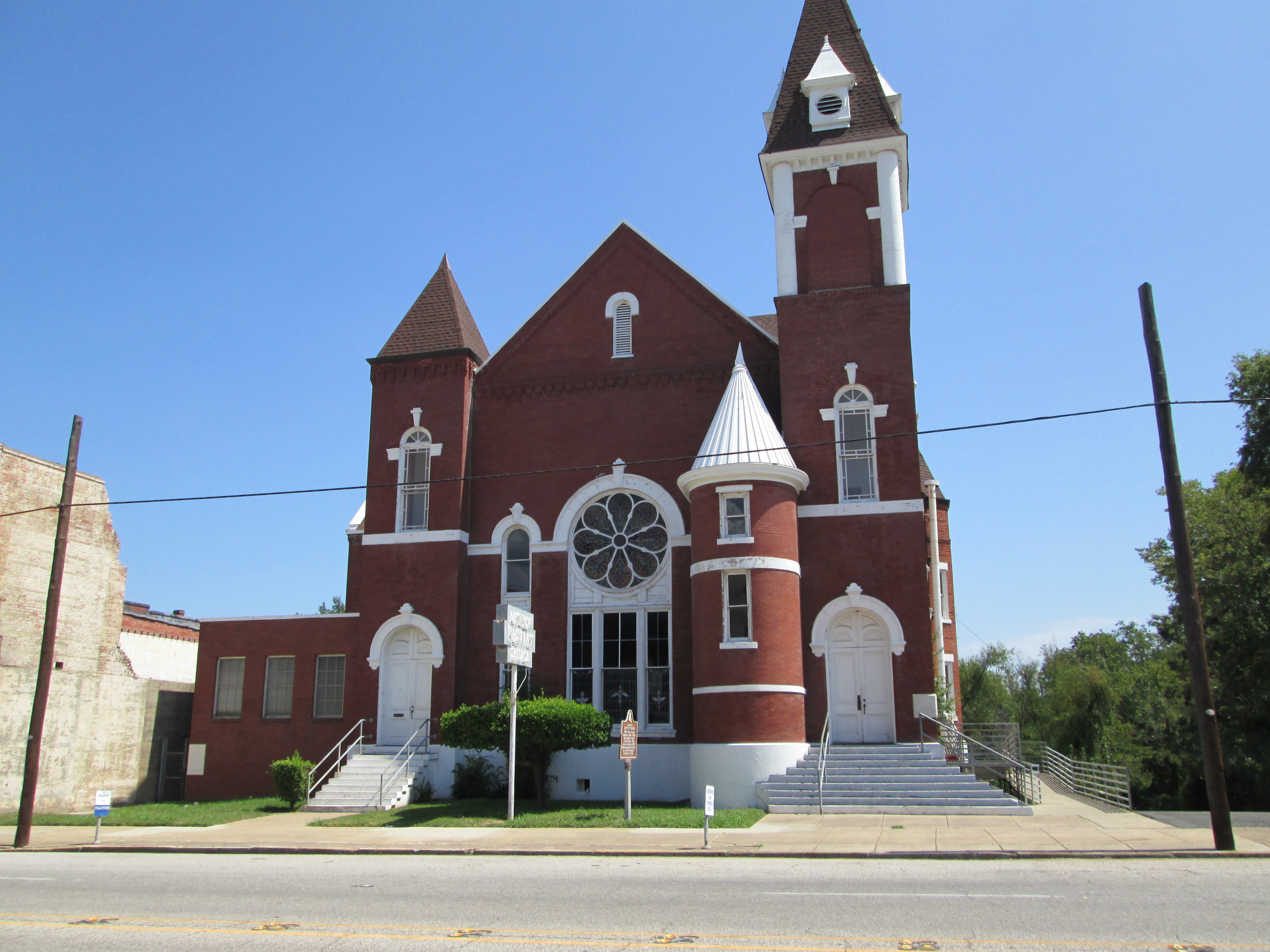
Antioch Baptist Church

Of note among its predominantly Baptist population, the First Baptist Church of Shreveport was once pastored by Monroe E. Dodd, founder of the former Dodd College for Girls. Former Governor Jimmie Davis, also a Shreveport city commissioner, taught history for a year under Dodd. Other historic large Baptist churches include Antioch Baptist, Galilee Missionary Baptist, Calvary Baptist, Broadmoor Baptist, Summer Grove Baptist, and Mount Canaan Missionary Baptist Church. Summer Grove Baptist Church was previously pastored by Wayne L. DuBose, a Baptist denominational officer. Mount Canaan was previously pastored by civil rights era icon Dr. Harry Blake, and Galilee was likewise pastored by Dr. E. Edward Jones, another civil rights icon.

Among its Methodist churches has been the large First Methodist Church, established in 1884. The current edifice dates to 1913. Among its former pastors were D. L. Dykes Jr. and John E. Fellers. During a severe thunderstorm in 2009, the fiberglass steeple of the church toppled and fell onto a passing car. It has since been replaced. A second prominent Methodist congregation is named for J. S. Noel Jr. The church was begun as a mission in 1906. In 2023, First United Methodist voted to leave the United Methodist Church.

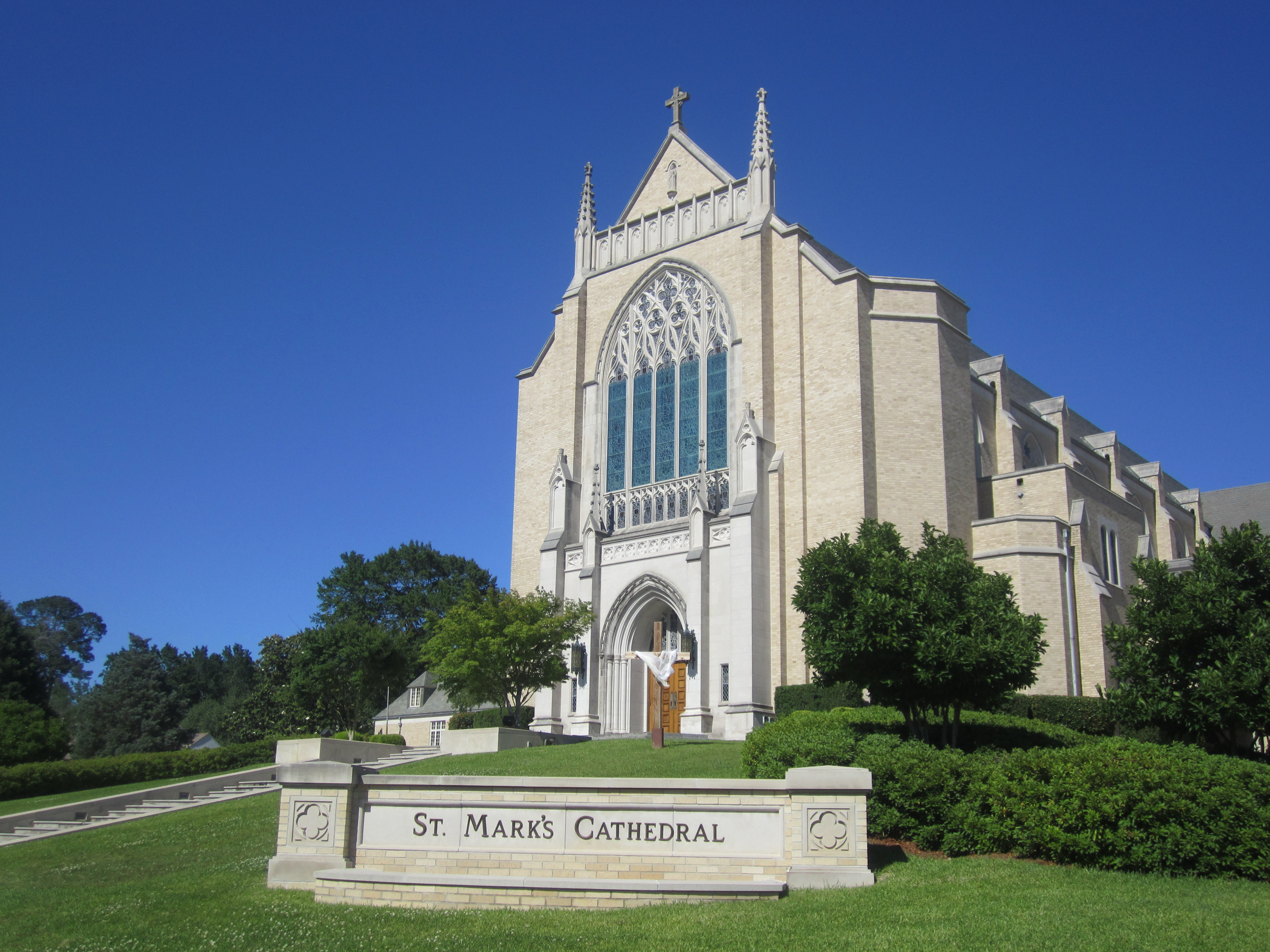
St. Mark's Cathedral, an Episcopal church

The large Holy Trinity Catholic Church, located downtown, was founded in 1858; it served Irish and German immigrants as well as native-born residents. Five priests died of yellow fever in the 1873 epidemic. The current sanctuary in Romanesque revival style architecture dates to 1896. Particularly striking in size and architecture is St. Mark's Cathedral, an Episcopal Church congregation dating its establishment to the first religious service held in Shreveport in 1839. It became the see of the Episcopal Diocese of Western Louisiana in 1990.

In Shreveport's interdenominational and Pentecostal population, Shreveport Community Church (an evangelical church affiliated with Assemblies of God USA) owns and operates Evangel Christian Academy, a pre‑K through 12th grade private school. The church has produced a biblical musical, Songs of the Season, during the Christmas holidays for over 20 years.

The Eastern Orthodox Church has maintained a presence in Shreveport since the early 1900s. The oldest Orthodox church in the city is St. George Greek Orthodox Church of the Greek Orthodox Archdiocese of America, followed by St. Nicholas Orthodox Church (Antiochian Orthodox Christian Archdiocese of North America), and the Holy Nativity of the Lord Church of the Orthodox Church in America.

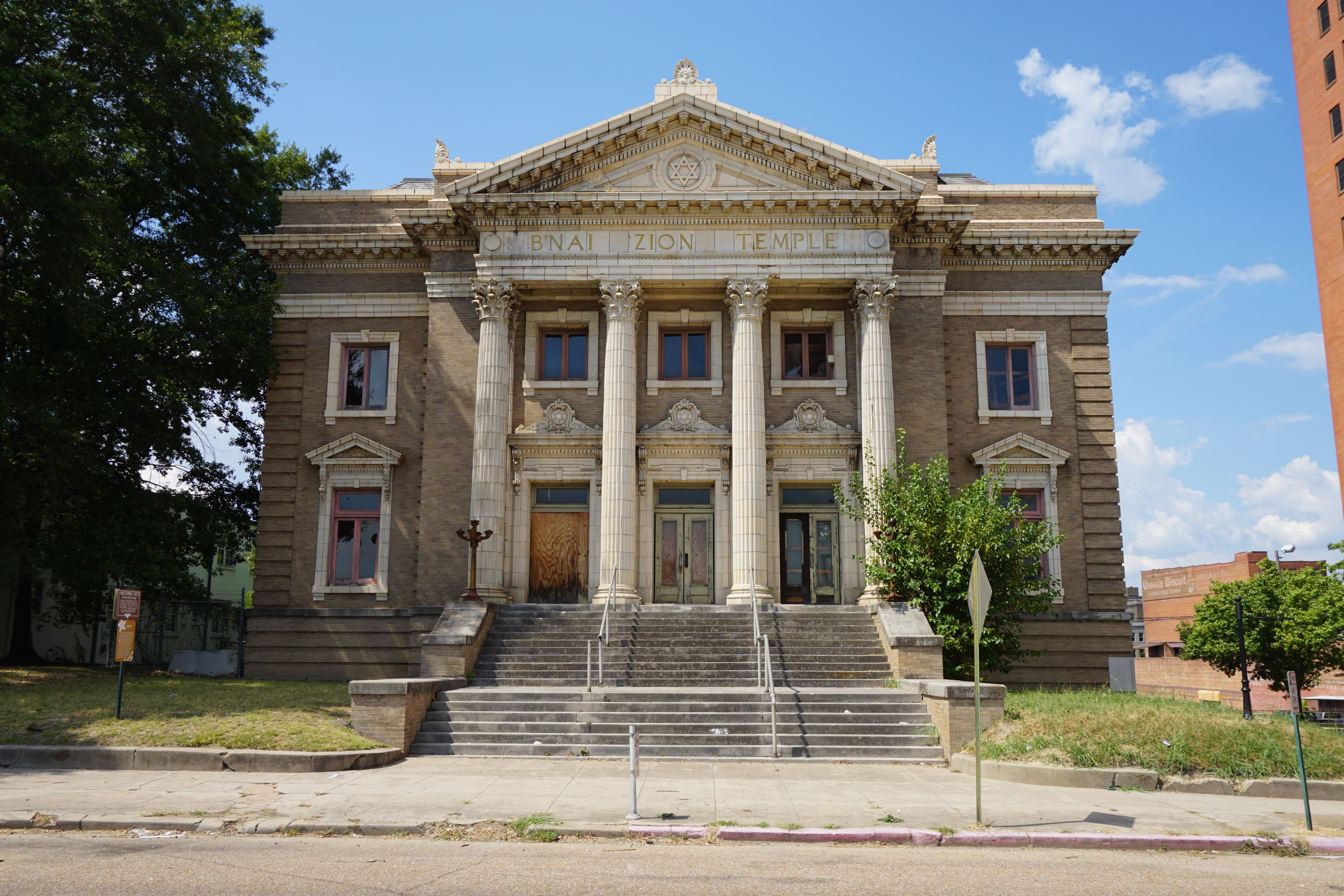
Original B'nai Zion Temple, designated a National Historic Place

The Jewish community of Shreveport dates to the organization of Congregation Har El in 1859, made up primarily of German Jewish immigrants in its early years. It developed as B'nai Zion Temple, today the city's Reform congregation, which built the city's largest synagogue. Agudath Achim, founded in 1905 as an Orthodox congregation of immigrants from Eastern Europe, is today a traditional Jewish synagogue. Shreveport, historically, has had a large and civic-minded Jewish community and has elected three Jewish mayors.

The Islamic community in Shreveport-Bossier constituted approximately 14% of Louisiana's total Muslim population in 2018. The majority of Shreveporter Muslims are Sunni, followed by the Nation of Islam and non-denominational Islam.

== Economy ==
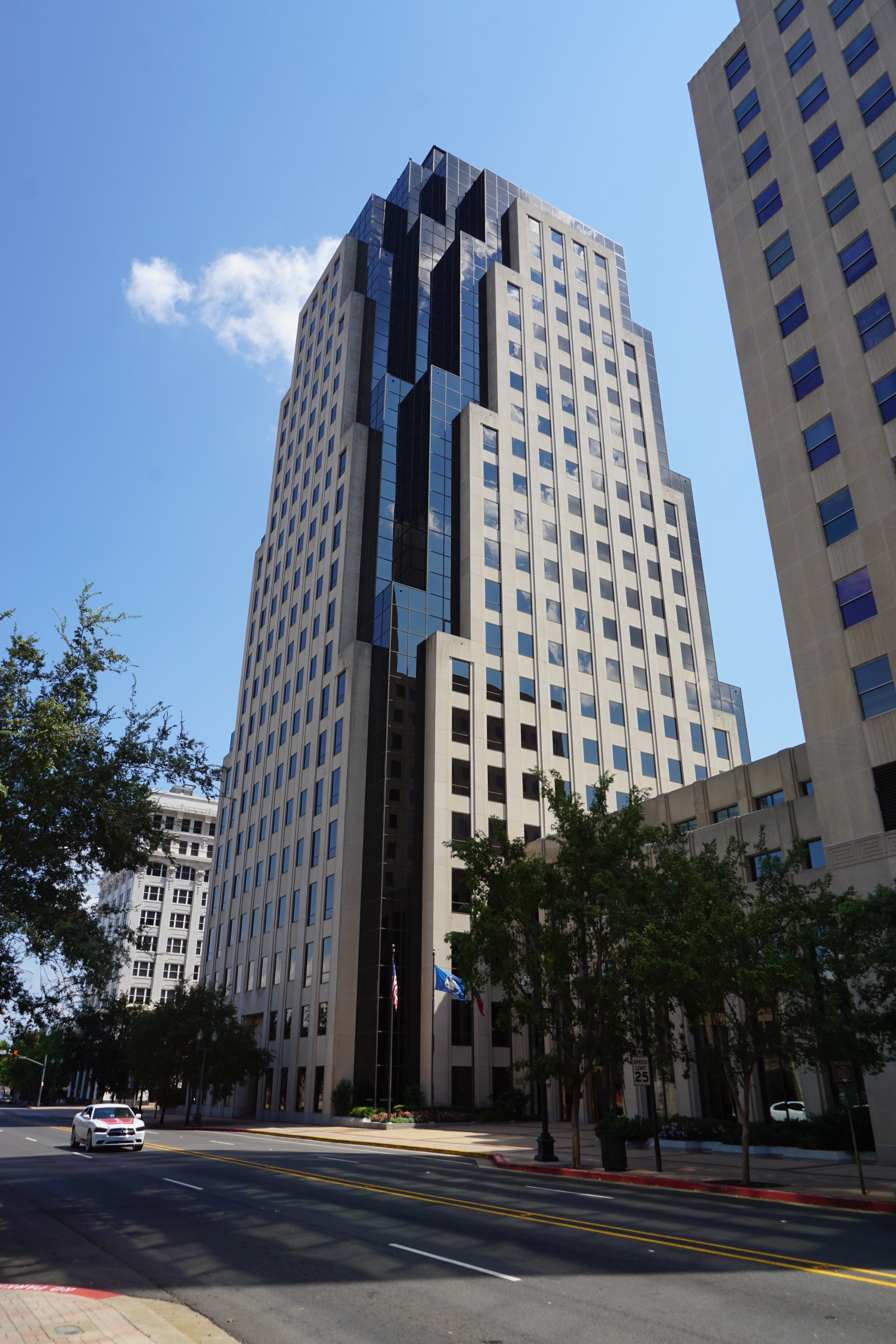
Regions Tower, the tallest building in downtown Shreveport

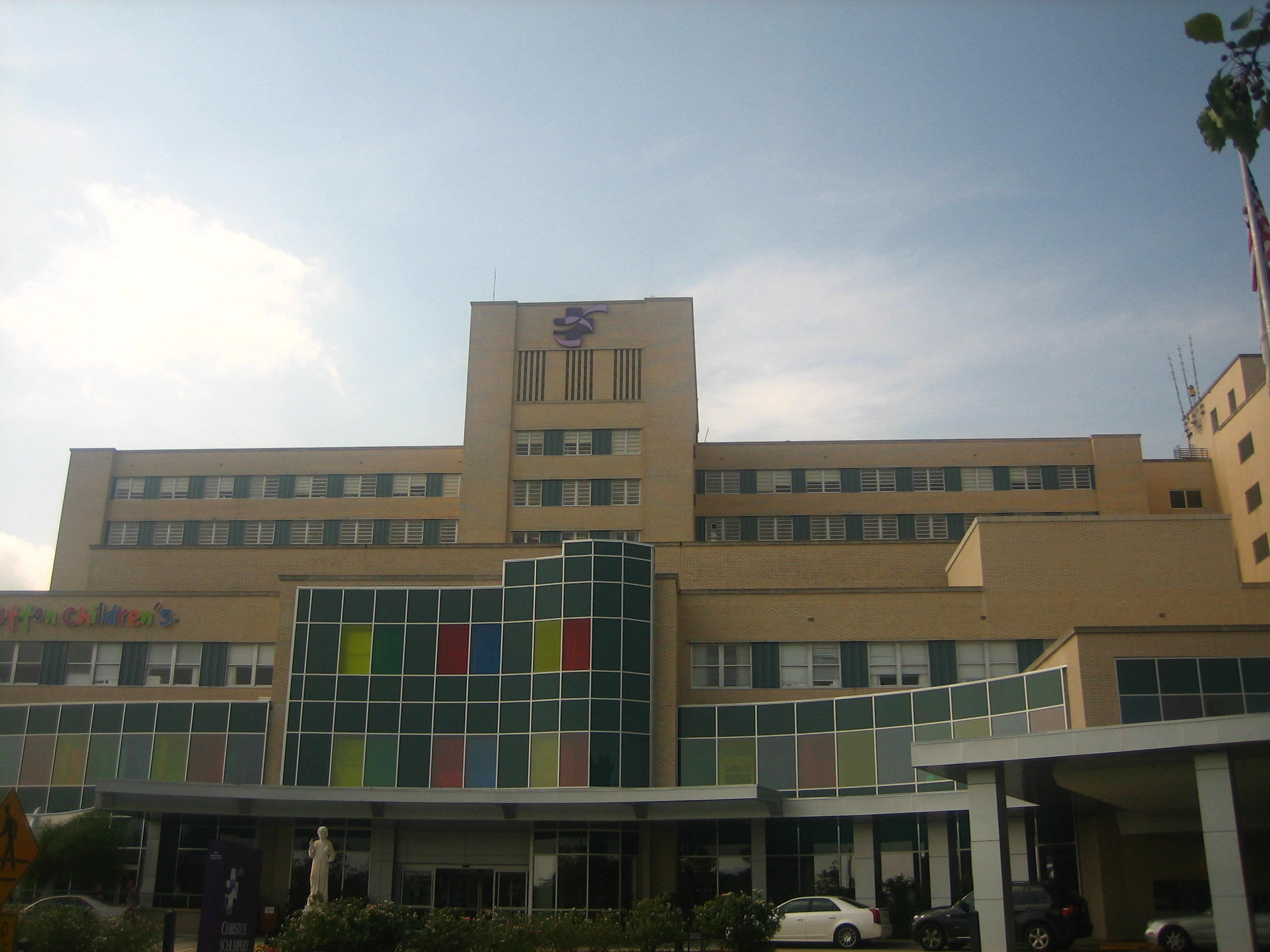
Health care is a major industry in Shreveport; Christus Schumpert Medical Center is the secondary leading cancer-treatment facility in the South, behind Willis Knighton.

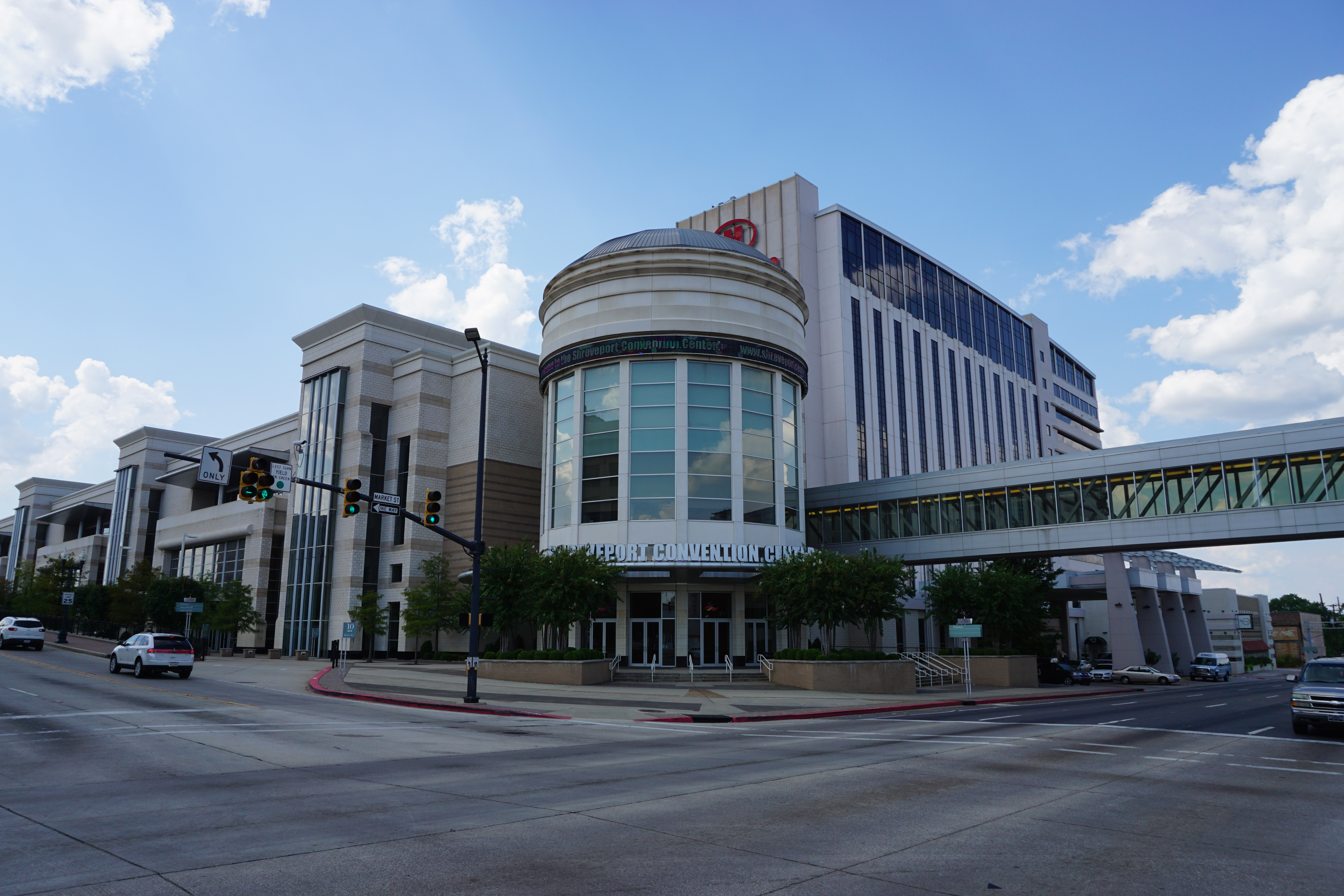
The Shreveport Convention Center

Shreveport was formerly a major player in United States oil business, and once hosted the Standard Oil of Louisiana offices, a branch of Standard Oil. The Louisiana branch was later absorbed by Standard Oil of New Jersey. Beginning in 1930, United Gas Corporation, the nation's busiest pipeline operator and massive integrated oil company, was headquartered in Shreveport. Pennzoil performed a hostile takeover in 1968, and forced a merger. In the 1980s, the oil and gas industry suffered a large economic downturn. This severely affected the regional economy, and many companies cut back jobs or went out of business, including a large retail shopping mall (South Park Mall) which closed in the late 1990s. Shreveport's economy entered a major economic recession, and many residents left the area.

At one time, Shreveport was home to numerous manufacturers, including Shreveport Operations, a General Motors plant that permanently closed in August 2012. The plant produced the Chevrolet Colorado, GMC Canyon, Hummer H3 series, and the Isuzu i-Series. In January 2013, the plant was leased from Caddo Parish by Elio Motors. However, Elio Motors never went into production at the Shreveport plant.

In addition to GM, other notable large companies that have had or still have Shreveport manufacturing/assembly or production facilities or operations include: General Electric (electric transformer production), Western Electric (payphone manufacturing, approximately 7,500 employees at its peak, changed ownership through the years but closed in 2001) Honeywell UOP, Libbey-Owens-Ford, Beaird-Poulan (the originator of and, for decades, the only manufacturer of the single-operator chainsaw in the world), Calumet Specialty Products Partners (originally United Gas Corporation's Atlas Processing Unit and then Pennzoil), and Frymaster, LLC (a subsidiary of The Manitowoc Company). Today, only Calumet Packaging and Honeywell UOP survive as a large manufacturing employer in Shreveport.

By 2017, manufacturing and other goods-producing (e.g. petrochemical refining) jobs accounted for just 5% of Shreveport occupations, compared to 8% for the nationwide percentage of the workforce involved in manufacturing.

Shreveport has since largely transitioned to a service economy. In particular, there has been rapid growth in the gaming industry. The city hosts various riverboat gambling casinos, and, before Hurricane Katrina in 2005, was second only to New Orleans in Louisiana tourism. Nearby Bossier City is home to one of the three horse racetracks in the state, Louisiana Downs. Casinos in Shreveport-Bossier include Sam's Town, Bally's, Horseshoe, Boomtown, and Margaritaville. Diamond Jacks Casino (formerly Isle of Capri) closed in 2020. The Shreveport-Bossier Convention and Tourist Bureau is the official tourism information agency for the region. The bureau maintains a comprehensive database of restaurants, accommodations, attractions, and events.

In May 2005, the Louisiana Boardwalk, a 550,000-square-foot (51,000 m^{2}) shopping and entertainment complex, opened in Bossier City across from Shreveport's downtown. It features outlet shopping, several restaurants, a 14‑screen movie theater, a bowling complex, and Bass Pro Shops.

A 350,000-square-foot (33,000 m^{2}) convention center was completed in the Shreveport Downtown Riverfront. Managed by SMG, it includes an 800-space parking garage. An adjoining Hilton Hotel opened in June 2007. It was constructed by and owned by the city, which has been a controversial issue, and the subject of discussions about use of public funds.

In November 2008, development of the Haynesville Shale area, with new jobs in the natural gas industry were expected to be created over the next few years. Residents in the region have been given large bonuses for signing mineral rights leases up to $25,000 per acre. However, economic downturn had resulted in a lower market price for natural gas and slower-than-expected drilling activity. The city expected to generate revenue by leasing the mineral rights on public lands in the near future as neighboring municipalities had already done. However, with advances in fracking methods in the Haynesville shale and starting in 2022 with the increase of natural gas prices after Covid to as high as $8/Mcf (thousand cubic feet), rig activity has greatly increased in the Haynesville to be the 2nd largest basin in the United States by number of active drilling rigs (2nd only to the Permian Basin - largest basin in the United States). It has since slowed to a degree since natural gas prices have decreased but is still the 3rd highest ranked basin in the US in terms of number of active drilling rigs.

Gambling and hotel industries in Shreveport, JPMorgan Chase, Capital One, and Regions Financial Corporation have regional offices in Shreveport's downtown and surrounding districts and neighborhoods. AT&T's regional headquarters is located in Downtown Shreveport. Amazon and Governor Edwards announced plans to open a fulfillment center in 2021.

Amazon began construction on the $200 million fulfillment center in 2021 with completion expected by the end of 2022. The fulfillment center was expected to create 1,000 direct jobs. Additionally, other business investments alongside Amazon during the early 2020s contributed more than $750 million to revitalizing and expanding the municipal and metropolitan economy. By October 2023, Amazon planned to open a second facility in Shreveport.

In December 2023, the city council approved a lease of Millennium Studios to rapper 50 Cent's new production company.

In 2014, the city government pumped $16.5 million into Mall St. Vincent in an attempt to attract new customers to the mall. However, by 2021, Auntie Anne's, Gymboree, Grimaldi's Pizzeria, and Sears had closed their Mall St. Vincent operations, leaving Dilliards as the only anchor store.

Fortune magazine ranked Shreveport the "#1 place to start a business" in 2015. In 2020, Advanced Aero Services planned to open a facility at Shreveport Regional Airport, while employer Libbey Glass closed its doors for good after 47 years of operation, resulting in the loss of 450 jobs. On July 31, 2020, the Shreveport Economic Recovery Task Force released a revitalization plan with a primary focus on the downtown area.

=== Film industry ===
Tax incentives offered by the state government have given Louisiana the third largest film industry in the country, behind California and New York. Louisiana is sometimes called "Hollywood South". A number of films have been made in Shreveport. Facilities include sound stages, prop rental facilities, the Fairgrounds Complex, and the Louisiana Wave Studio, a computer-controlled outdoor wave pool.

Selected films shot in Shreveport include:

- The Initiation of Sarah (2006): Summer Glau
- The Guardian (2006): Ashton Kutcher and Kevin Costner
- Factory Girl (2006): Sienna Miller and Guy Pearce
- The Great Debaters (2007): Denzel Washington
- Mr. Brooks (2007): Kevin Costner, William Hurt, and Demi Moore
- Premonition (2007): Sandra Bullock and Julian McMahon
- Cleaner (2007): Samuel L. Jackson
- The Mist (2007): Thomas Jane, Toby Jones and Marcia Gay Harden
- Welcome Home Roscoe Jenkins (2008): Martin Lawrence and Cedric the Entertainer
- Soul Men (2008) Samuel L. Jackson, Bernie Mac
- Year One (2008): Jack Black and Michael Cera
- W. (2008): Josh Brolin, Richard Dreyfuss and James Cromwell
- Harold & Kumar Escape from Guantanamo Bay (2008): John Cho and Kal Penn
- I Hope They Serve Beer in Hell (2009): Matt Czuchry, Jesse Bradford and Geoff Stults
- Super (2010): Elliot Page, Rainn Wilson
- Straw Dogs (2011): James Marsden, Kate Bosworth
- Drive Angry (2011): Nicolas Cage
- Trespass (2011): Nicolas Cage and Nicole Kidman
- Battle: Los Angeles (2011): Michelle Rodriguez, Bridget Moynahan
- The Iceman (2012): Michael Shannon, Winona Ryder
- Ain't Them Bodies Saints (2013): Casey Affleck, Rooney Mara
- Olympus Has Fallen (2013): Gerard Butler, Aaron Eckhart, Morgan Freeman
- Texas Chainsaw 3D (2013)
- The Town that Dreaded Sundown (2014)
- Dark Places (2015): Chloë Grace Moretz, Charlize Theron
- I Saw the Light (2015): Tom Hiddleston, Elizabeth Olsen

Several television series have been shot in Shreveport and the surrounding area, including The Gates (2010), and Salem (2014). The Louisiana Film Prize has spurred the creation of over 200 short films shot in Shreveport and Northwest Louisiana by filmmakers from around the world since its inception in 2012.

As of 2023, G-Unit Film and Television, which has recently undergone renovations, serves as the primary filming location for projects involving 50 Cent. Additionally, it also operates as the creative center for the entertainment and film industry within Northwest Louisiana and the Ark-La-Tex.

== Arts and culture ==
Shreveport is home to many theatres, museums, and performing arts groups, including:

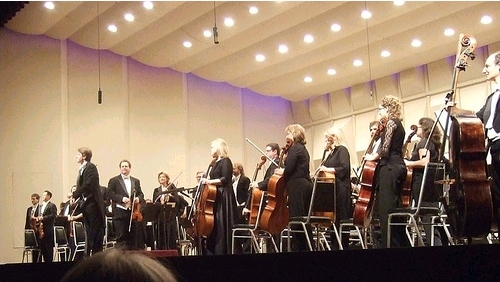
Shreveport Symphony Orchestra in 2010

- Academy of Children's Theatre
- Artspace Shreveport
- Barnwell Memorial Garden and Art Center
- Hayride Diner/Soundstage 516
- J.O.S.H. Lounge – Jazz, Old School and Heritage
- Louisiana Dance Theatre
- Louisiana State Exhibit Museum
- Marjorie Lyons Playhouse on the Centenary College Campus
- Meadows Museum of Art – Centenary College
- Multicultural Center of the South
- Once in a Millennium Moon mural by Meg Saligman
- Power and Grace School of Performing Arts
- R. W. Norton Art Gallery
- River City Repertory Theatre, the professional theatre for Shreveport-Bossier
- RiverView Theatre
- Robinson Film Center
- Shreveport House Concerts
- Shreveport Little Theatre
- Shreveport Metropolitan Ballet
- Shreveport Municipal Auditorium
- Shreveport Opera
- Shreveport Symphony Orchestra
- Southern University Museum of Art
- Spring Street Museum
- StageCenter Performing Arts
- The Strand Theatre
- Theatre of the Performing Arts of Shreveport

=== Events ===
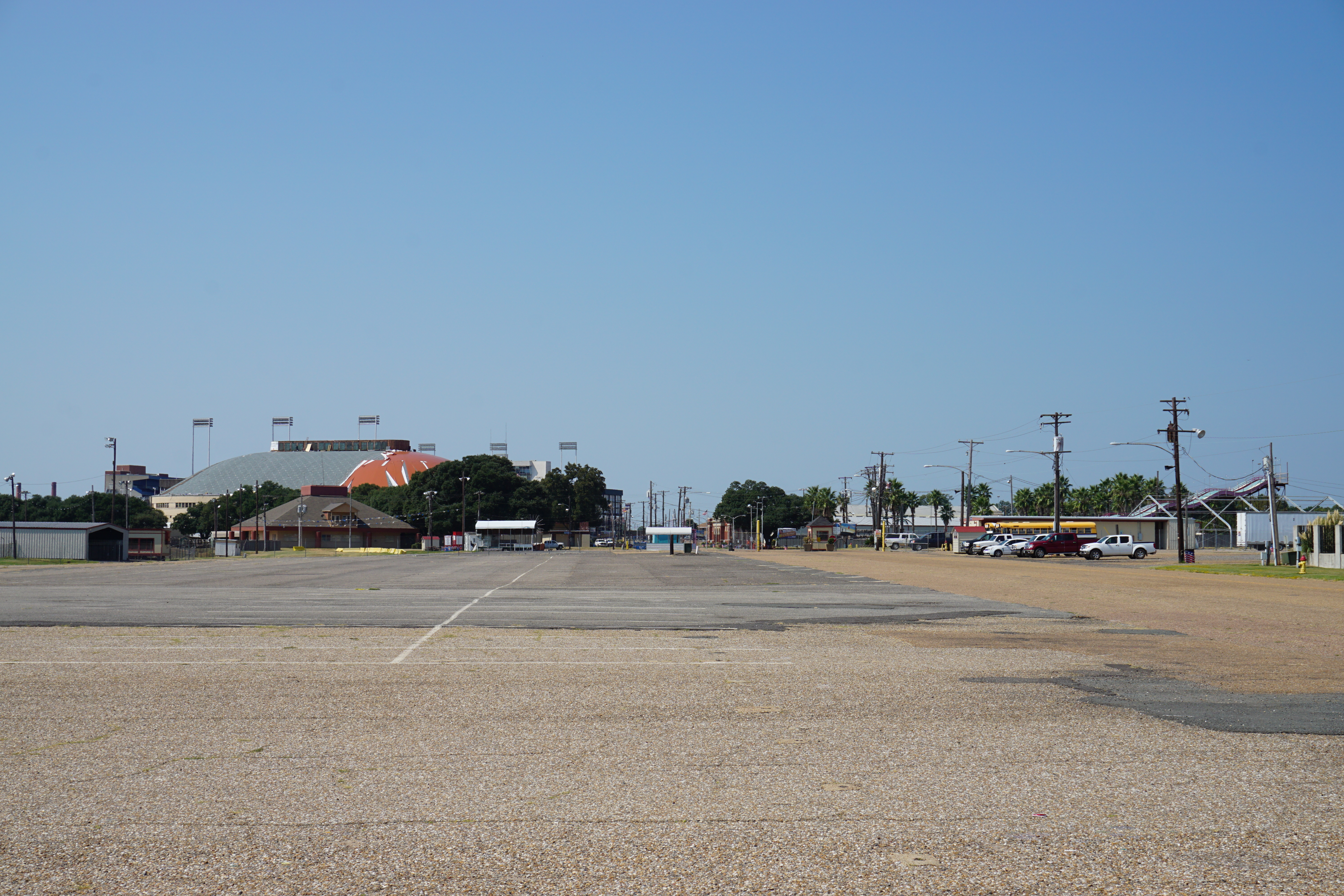
Louisiana State Fair Grounds in 2015

- ArtBreak Festival, largest annual student arts festival in the South since 1984
- Barksdale Air Force Base Air Show, held annually since 1933
- Cinco De Mayo Fiesta, held annually since 1998
- Highland Jazz & Blues Festival, held annually the second Saturday of November since 2003
- Holiday in Dixie, annual springtime festival, began 1949
- Independence Bowl, held annually close to New Year's since 1976
- Independence Day Festival, held annually on the 4th of July since 2009
- Let the Good Times Roll Festival, annual Juneteenth festival since 1986
- Louisiana Film Prize, short film competition and film festival
- Mardi Gras parades
- Mudbug Madness, annual celebration of crawfish, held each May since 1984
- Red River Balloon Rally, annual summer festival since 2016
- Red River Revel, annual autumn arts festival which began in 1976; the largest outdoor festival in northern Louisiana
- The State Fair of Louisiana, held annually each autumn since 1906

==== Mardi Gras ====
Mardi Gras celebrations in Shreveport date to the mid‑19th century when krewes and parades were organized along the lines of those of New Orleans. Mardi Gras in Shreveport did not survive the cancellations caused by World War I. Attempts to revive it in the 1920s were unsuccessful, and the last Carnival celebrations in Shreveport for decades were held in 1927. Mardi Gras in Shreveport was revived beginning in 1984 with the organization of the Krewe of Apollo. The Krewes of Gemini, Centaur, Aesclepius, Highland, Sobek, Harambee, and others, followed during the next decade and a half. The first krewe to revive parading was Gemini in 1989. Today, Mardi Gras is again an important part of the cultural life of the Shreveport-Bossier metropolitan area.

== Sports ==
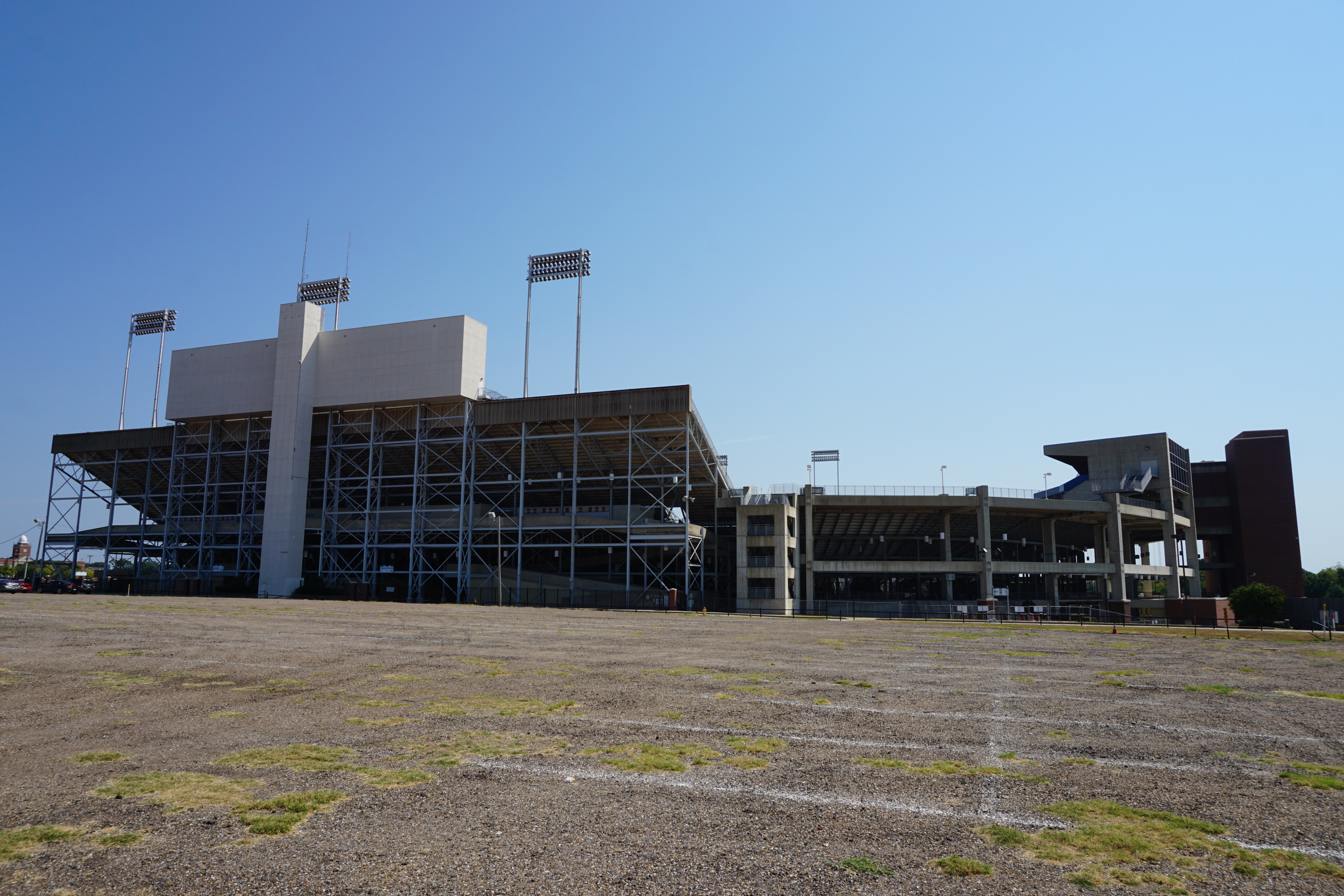
Independence Stadium, 2015

Dating back to 1911, the state fairgrounds (and later Independence Stadium, formerly State Fair Stadium) has traditionally hosted a college football game or two during the State Fair of Louisiana, an event currently dubbed the Red River State Fair Classic. Since 1976, Independence Stadium has served as host of college football's annual Independence Bowl. Also, the Louisiana Tech Bulldogs football team occasionally hosts games at Independence Stadium.

Shreveport has been home to several professional football teams. The Houston franchise of the professional World Football League relocated to Shreveport rebranded as the Shreveport Steamer midway through the 1974 season, but the franchise along with the WFL folded midway through the 1975 season. Another franchise named the Shreveport Steamers played as a member of the American Football Association from 1979 until folding in 1981. Shreveport's Independence Stadium was also home to the Shreveport Pirates, an unsuccessful professional Canadian Football League franchise that opened play in 1994 but folded after the 1995 season.

Baseball in Shreveport has an extensive history. The city had affiliated Minor League Baseball teams from 1968 to 2002. The most memorable team was the Shreveport Captains of the Texas League. Baseball teams in Shreveport have gone through eight different name changes and seven different leagues all since 1895. Shreveport's most recent independent minor league baseball team, the Shreveport-Bossier Captains, ceased operations in 2011 and moved to Laredo, Texas.

The city also has an extensive history in basketball and soccer. The Shreveport Crawdads and Shreveport Storm operated in 1994 and 1995 as members of the Continental Basketball Association. The Shreveport-Bossier Mavericks of the American Basketball Association played from 2013 to 2015 before relocating to Owensboro, Kentucky; since 2021, the Mavericks returned as the Shreveport Mavericks within The Basketball League. The Shreveport/Bossier Lions played in 1998 as affiliates of the United Soccer League. NPSL-affiliate Shreveport Rafters FC operated from 2016 to 2018; their expansion team for the Women's Premier Soccer League operated for one season in 2017. Shreveport almost had a USL expansion team in 2020 before its rejection by the city council, though USL League Two announced the establishment of Blue Goose SC in 2022. The city was also considered as location for an NBA G League-affiliate of the New Orleans Pelicans. The city council unanimously rejected the proposal.

The Shreveport Mudbugs are a Tier II junior ice hockey team that has competed in the North American Hockey League since 2016.

On the collegiate front, the Centenary Gentlemen and Ladies compete in NCAA Division III as a member of the Southern Collegiate Athletic Conference. The LSU–Shreveport Pilots compete in the NAIA as a member of the Red River Athletic Conference.

== Government ==
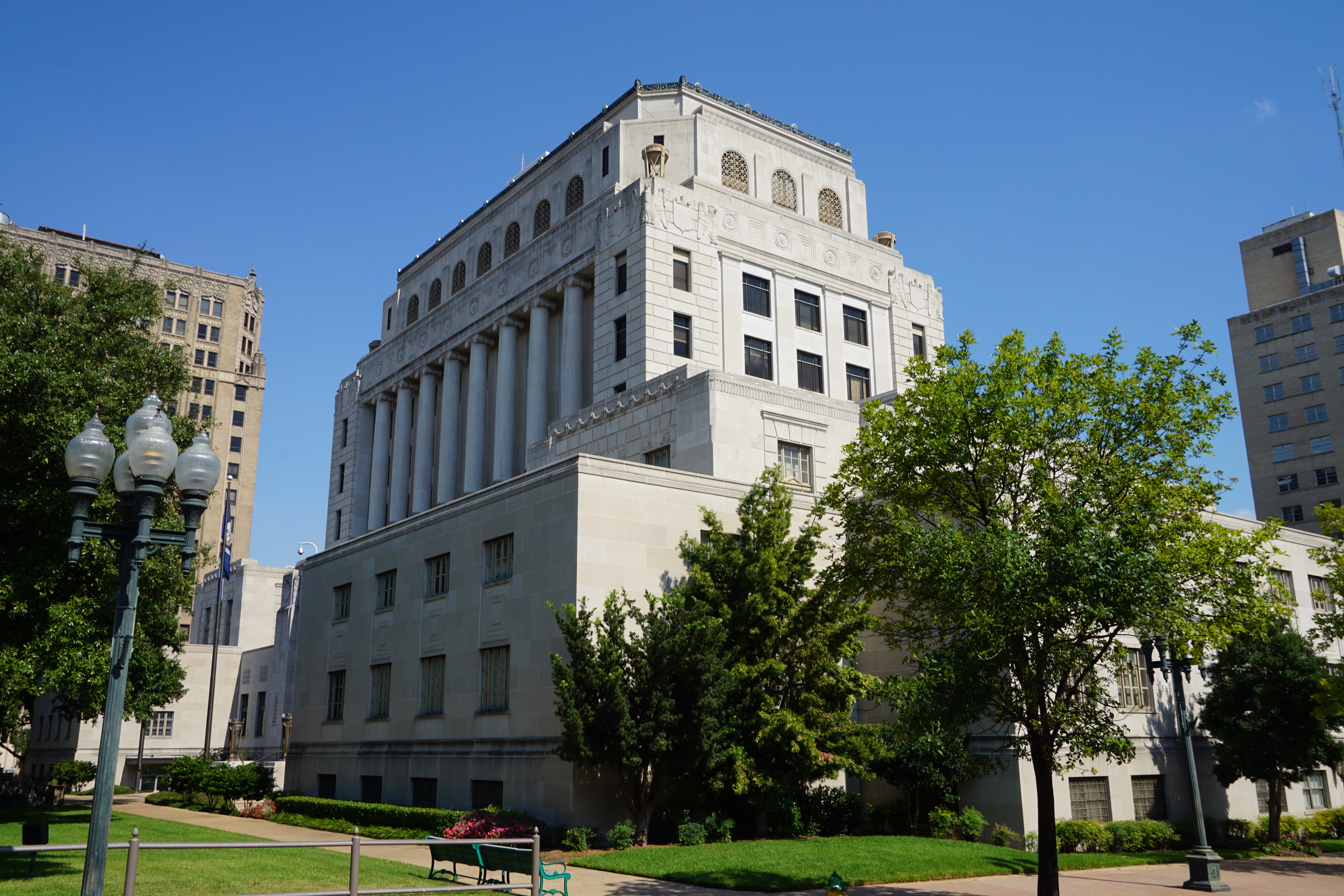
Caddo Parish Courthouse

Founded in 1836 and incorporated in 1839, Shreveport is the parish seat of Caddo Parish. It is part of the First Judicial District, housing the parish courthouse. It also houses the Louisiana Second Circuit Court of Appeal, which consists of nine elected judges representing twenty parishes in Northwest Louisiana. A portion of east Shreveport extends into Bossier Parish due to the changing course of the Red River.

The city of Shreveport has a mayor-council government. The elected municipal officials include the mayor, Tom Arceneaux, and seven members of the city council. Cedric Glover, a member of the Louisiana House of Representatives, was the first African American to hold the mayoral position. Under the mayor-council government, the mayor serves as the executive officer of the city. As the city's chief administrator and official representative, the mayor is responsible for the general management of the city and for seeing that all laws and ordinances are enforced.

== Crime ==
According to the most recent FBI statistics, the total crime rate in Shreveport (as of 2022) is 5,722.4 per 100,000 people, or 143.92% higher than the national rate of 2,346.0 per 100,000 people and 62.39% higher than the Louisiana total crime rate of 3,523.8 per 100,000 people. The violent crime rate in Shreveport is 923.0 per 100,000 people, or 138.01% higher than the national rate of 387.8 per 100,000 people, and 44.35% higher than the Louisiana violent crime rate of 639.4 per 100,000 people.

Shreveport has one of the highest crime rates in America compared to all communities of all sizes. One's chance of becoming a victim of either violent or property crime is 1 in 15. Within Louisiana, more than 93% of the communities had a lower crime rate than Shreveport. NeighborhoodScout found Shreveport to be one of the top 100 most dangerous cities in the United States. Shreveport was the first city in Louisiana to have Crips and Blood gangs. In 1993, Shreveport hit a peak in murders, with 86 killings. Most of the killings were drug- or gang-related homicides. In 2017, Shreveport was placed 18th on 24/7 Wall St.'s list of "America's 25 Murder Capitals." Shreveport's crime rate was 71% higher than the Louisiana average. The crime rate was also 149% higher than the national average.

The city had a so-called "saggy pants" law since 2007. The city ordinance was repealed by the city council in June 2019.

== Education ==
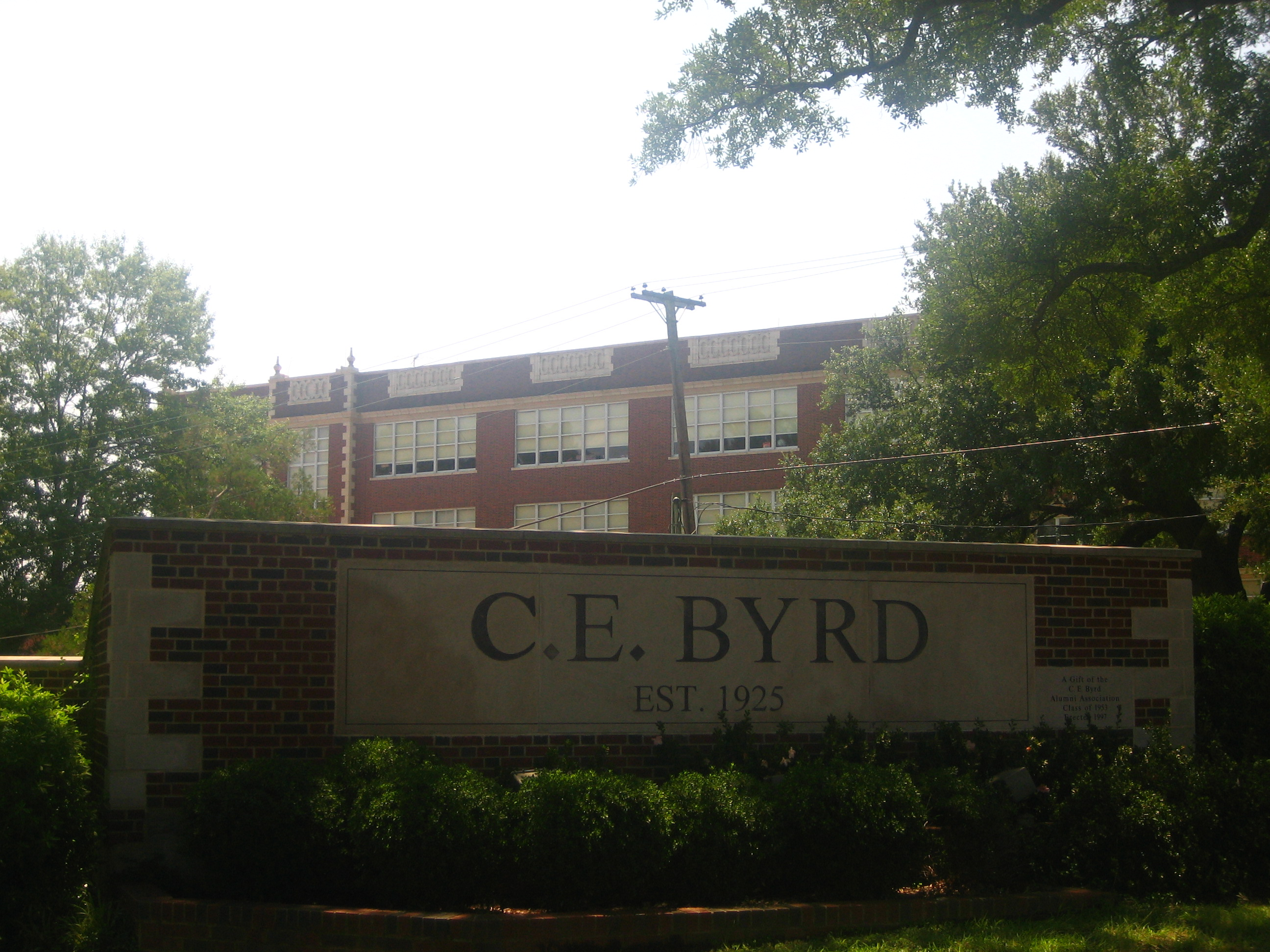
C. E. Byrd High School

Caddo Public Schools is a school district based in Shreveport. The district serves all of Caddo Parish, including the parish's sections of Shreveport. Its founding superintendent was Clifton Ellis Byrd, a Virginia native, who assumed the chief administrative position in 1907 and continued until his death in 1926. C. E. Byrd High School, which was established in 1925 on Line Avenue at the intersection with Kings Highway, bears his name. There are a number of private schools in the city as well, including Loyola College Prep, a coeducational high school founded in 1902 as the all-male St. John's High School.

Portions of Shreveport in Bossier Parish are instead within the Bossier Parish School District.

=== Colleges and universities ===
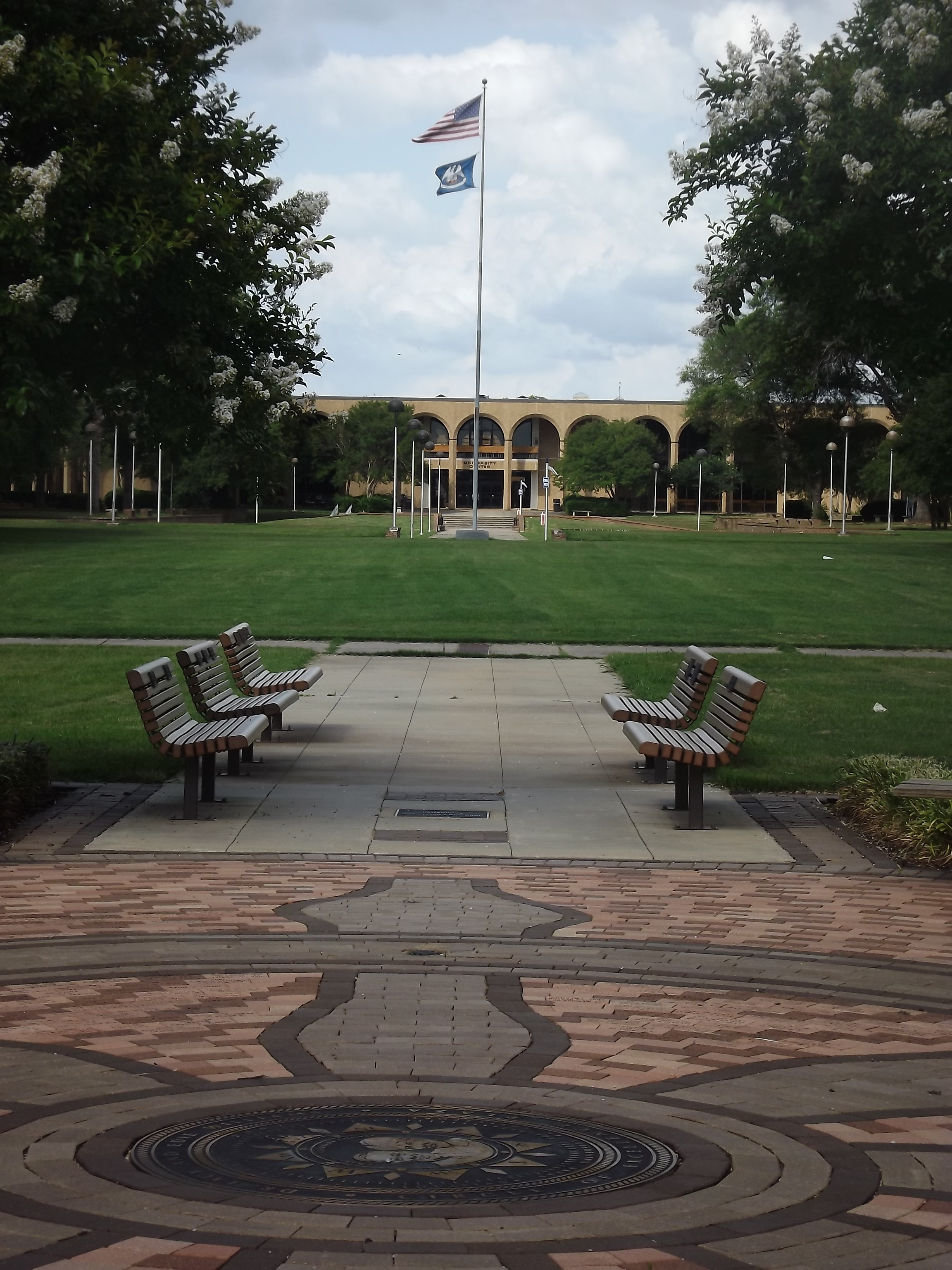
Louisiana State University Shreveport

Shreveport has several colleges, including the Methodist-affiliated Centenary College (founded at Jackson, Louisiana, in 1825; relocated to Shreveport in 1908) and Louisiana State University in Shreveport, which opened as a two-year institution in 1967; it became a four-year institution in 1976. Louisiana State University Health Sciences Center Shreveport, the only medical school in Northern Louisiana, opened in 1969. Shreveport also has one of the largest nursing schools in northern Louisiana, the Northwestern State University College of Nursing.

Louisiana Tech University at Shreveport-Bossier City was launched in 2012 offering their Executive MBA and main campus undergraduate and graduate degree programs at the university's Shreveport Center. Southern University at Shreveport (SUSLA) offers a two-year associate's degree program. Founded in 1973, Louisiana Baptist University and Theological Seminary is also located in Shreveport, at 6301 Westport Avenue.

Both Caddo and Bossier parishes are in the areas of Bossier Parish Community College and Northwest Louisiana Technical Community College.

Ayers Career College is a Shreveport-based college that offers career training in the medical and HVAC fields. Since July 2007, Shreveport is home to a local Remington College campus. This location offers both diploma and degree programs, and is active in the Shreveport community. Virginia College opened in 2012. Located in Shreveport-Bossier City, it offers career training in areas such as business and office, health and medical, and medical billing.

== Media ==
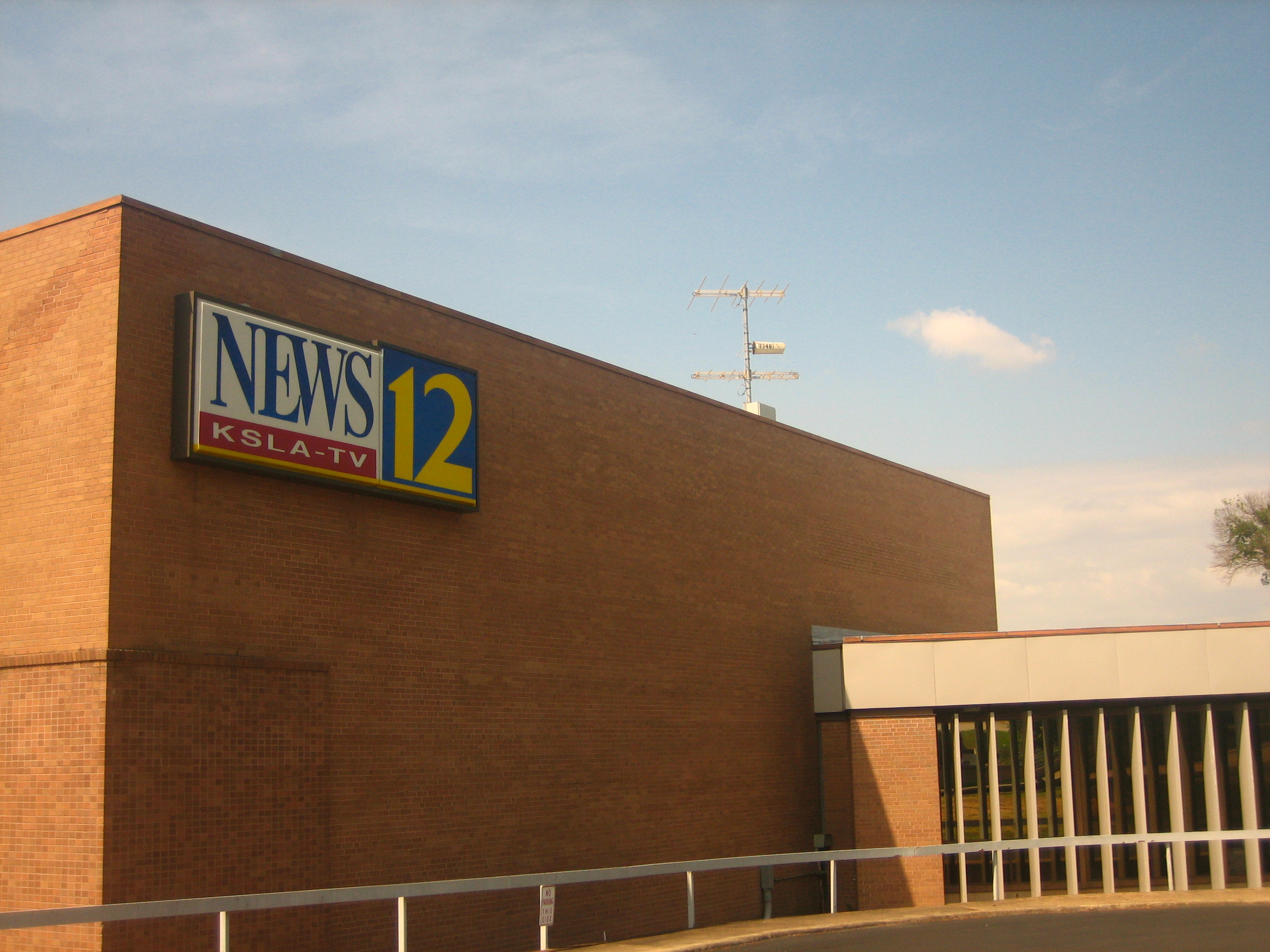
KSLA, a CBS affiliate, is the oldest television station in Shreveport. Established in the former Washington Youree Hotel in 1954, it was moved to Fairfield Avenue in the early 1970s.

Shreveport and its surrounding area are served by a variety of local newspapers, magazines, television stations and radio stations. The major daily newspaper serving the area is The Shreveport Times, owned by USA Today parent Gannett. The newspaper's former rival, the afternoon Shreveport Journal, ceased publication in 1991. Other major newspapers include The Shreveport Sun, Caddo Citizen, and SB Magazine. The Shreveport Sun is the area's primary African American newspaper.

Across the Red River, Shreveport's sister city of Bossier City is served by the daily Bossier Press-Tribune. The Barksdale Warrior is the weekly newspaper of record for the Barksdale Air Force Base. Alternative publications include The Forum Newsweekly, City Lights, The Inquisitor and The Shreveport Catalyst. Twice annually, North Louisiana History, the journal of the North Louisiana Historical Association, is published in Shreveport.

Shreveport and Bossier City are primarily served by two major cable television and internet companies: Shreveport is served by Comcast and Bossier City is served by Suddenlink.

== Infrastructure ==
=== Transportation ===
==== Highways and roads ====
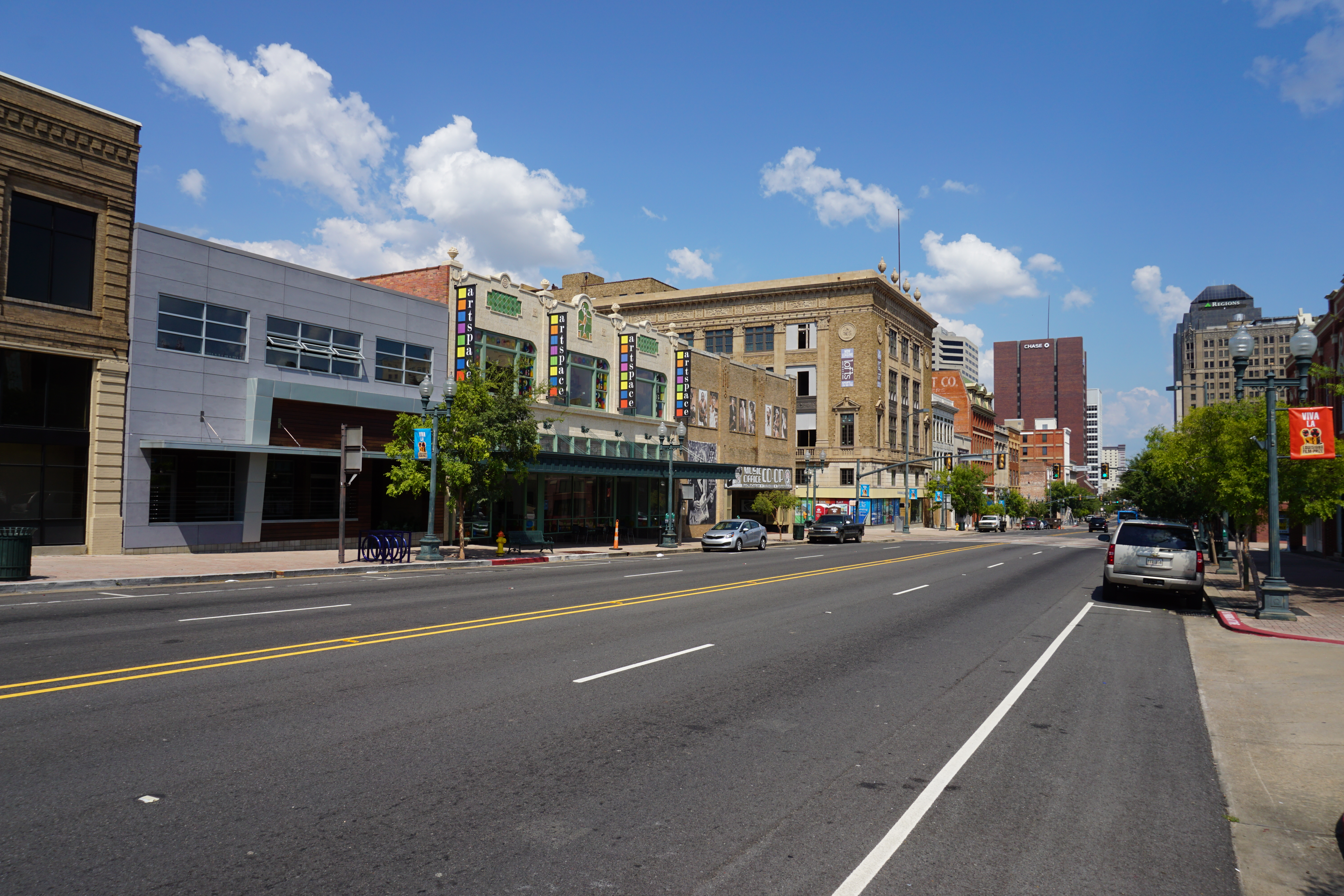
Texas Street

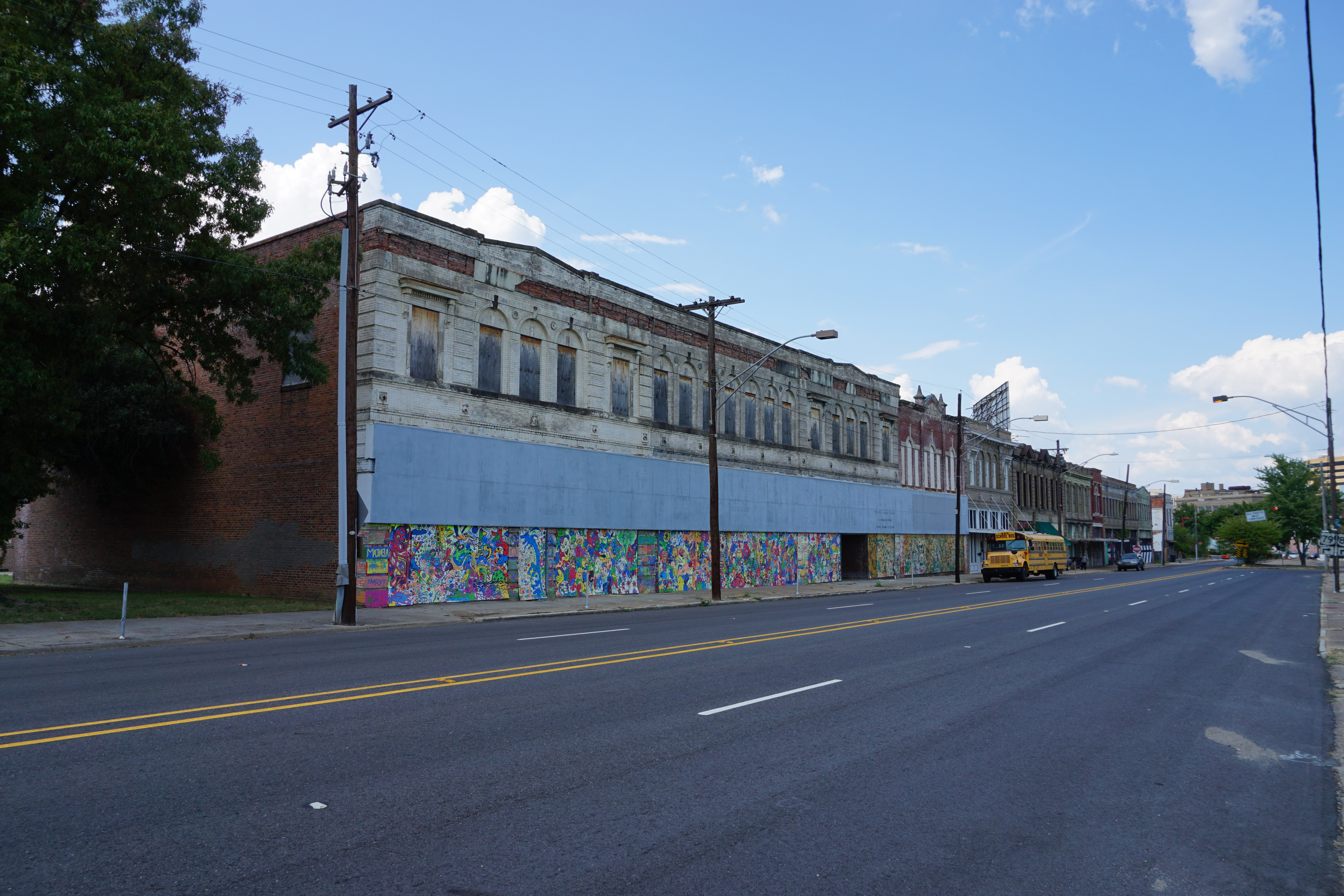
Texas Avenue

Shreveport's past reflects the need for mass transit and public roads. As far back as the 1870s, residents used mule-drawn street cars that were converted to electric motorized streetcars by 1890. Commuter rail systems in Shreveport flourished for many decades, and rail car lines extended out to rural areas. By the 1930s, trolleys and streetcars began to be replaced by buses, although motor buses did not finally replace all trolley service until the 1960s. The local public transportation provider, SporTran, provides moderately extensive bus service throughout Shreveport and Bossier City. Sportran operates seven days a week on seventeen bus routes (five night routes) from 6:00 a.m. to 1:00 am, with no night service on Sunday.

In the 1960s, the Interstate Highway System came to the area with the construction of Interstate 20. The highway system has a cross-hair and loop freeway structure similar to that of Texas cities like Houston and Dallas. The loop consists of the Outer Loop Freeway Interstate 220 on the north and the Inner Loop Freeway, Louisiana Highway 3132, on the south, forming approximately an 8-mile-diameter (13 km) semi-loop around downtown. Another loop is formed by the Bert Kouns Industrial Loop (Louisiana Highway 526) and circles further south, crossing Interstate 49. I-49 now extends north to Interstate 30 in Arkansas, though there is a gap in I-49 within Shreveport.

Shreveport lies along the route of the proposed Interstate 69 North American Free Trade Agreement (NAFTA) superhighway that will link Canada, the U.S. industrial Midwest, Texas, and Mexico.

==== Airports ====
Shreveport is served by two airports. The larger is Shreveport Regional Airport (SHV), established in 1952, and is served by Allegiant Air, American Airlines, Delta Air Lines, and United Airlines (as United Express). The smaller airport, Shreveport Downtown Airport (DTN), was built in 1931 and is located north of the Downtown Business District along the Red River. It is currently a general aviation and reliever airport, but was originally Shreveport's commercial airport.

==== Railroads ====
The Shreveport Waterworks Museum contains the Shreveport Railroad Museum, commemorating area railroad history.

The city had been served until the 1960s by several passenger railroads, at different stations.

- Central Station at 1025 Marshall Street served the Louisiana and Arkansas Railroad
- Texas & Pacific Station at 104 Market Street served the Texas and Pacific Railway. Its last trains were unnamed successors to the Louisiana Eagle (Fort Worth-New Orleans) and the Louisiana Daylight. (El Paso-New Orleans)
- Union Station on Louisiana Avenue at Lake Street had the Illinois Central (the Southwestern Limited / Northeastern Limited -Shreveport-Meridian, MS), Kansas City Southern Railway (the Southern Belle -Kansas City-New Orleans), St. Louis Southwestern Railway (the Lone Star -Dallas-Memphis) and the Southern Pacific.

=== Military installations ===
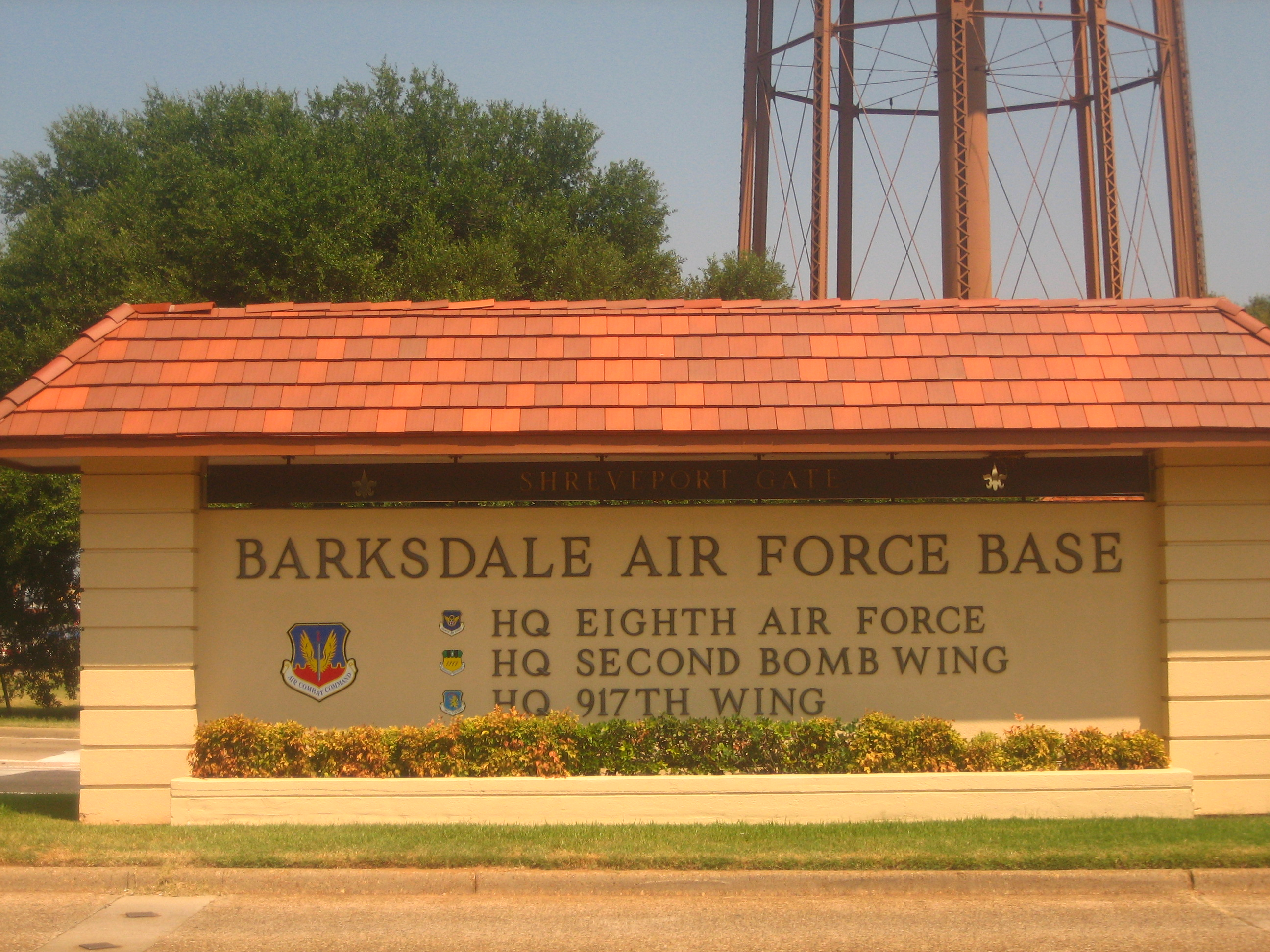
Entrance to Barksdale AFB

Barksdale Air Force Base is located in Bossier Parish across the river from Shreveport, which annexed and donated the land for its construction in the 1920s. Named for pioneer army aviator Lt. Eugene Hoy Barksdale and originally called Barksdale Army Air Field, it opened in 1933 and became Barksdale Air Force Base in 1947. Headquartered here are the Air Force Global Strike Command, 8th Air Force, 2d Bomb Wing, and 307th Wing. The primary aircraft housed here is the Boeing B-52 Stratofortress. In earlier years, the base was the home to other famous aircraft, including the B-47 Stratojet.

Shreveport is home to the two 108th Cavalry Squadrons, the reconnaissance element of the 256th Infantry Brigade. Three of the squadron's four cavalry troops are located at 400 East Stoner Avenue in a historic armory known as "Fort Humbug". It got the name due to the Confederate Army burning logs to look like cannons and placing them along the Red River. This caused Union ironclad ships sailing north on the Red River to be tricked into turning back south.

== See also ==
- Houston E. & W. T. Ry. Co. v. United States, a landmark U.S. Supreme Court Commerce Clause ruling commonly known as "The Shreveport Rate Cases"
- Mighty Haag Circus
- List of U.S. cities with large Black populations
- USS Shreveport
