= United States enterprise law =

United States enterprise law is the body of law concerning networks, platforms, utilities, public services (also NPU law) and the regulation of other enterprises or business entities. It is based on federal statutes, state statutes, and case law, that seek to guarantee human rights, particularly economic and social rights.

== History ==
- Second Bill of Rights
- Regulation
- Nationalization
- Privatization
- History of US antitrust law

== Administrative and general laws ==
The regulation of enterprise is subject to a range of federal and state rules that constitute the economy. First, principles of judicial review set the rules for all bodies exercising public authority

=== Administrative law ===
- Judicial review

=== Corporate and bankruptcy laws ===
- Delaware General Corporation Law
- New York Stock Exchange Listed Company Manual
- Securities and Exchange Act of 1934
- Securities Act of 1933
- Employee Retirement Income Security Act of 1974
- Bankruptcy Reform Act of 1978

=== Labor and employment laws ===
- National Labor Relations Act of 1935
- Fair Labor Standards Act of 1938
- Equal Pay Act of 1963
- Civil Rights Act of 1964
- WARN Act of 1988

=== Antitrust and consumer protection ===
- Sherman Act of 1890
- Clayton Act of 1914

== Networks and public services ==
=== Education ===
- 1965: Elementary and Secondary Education Act (ESEA)
- 1965: Higher Education Act of 1965 (HEA) (Pub. L. No. 89-329)
- 1974: Family Educational Rights and Privacy Act (FERPA)
- 1974: Equal Educational Opportunities Act of 1974 (EEOA)
- 1975: Education for All Handicapped Children Act (EHA) (Pub. L. No. 94-142)
- 1978: Protection of Pupil Rights Amendment
- 1980: Department of Education Organization Act (Pub. L. No. 96-88)
- 1984: Equal Access Act
- 1990: The Jeanne Clery Disclosure of Campus Security Policy and Campus Crime Statistics Act (Clery Act)
- 1994: Improving America's Schools Act of 1994
- 2001: No Child Left Behind Act (NCLB)
- 2004: Individuals with Disabilities Education Act (IDEA)
- 2005: Higher Education Reconciliation Act of 2005 (HERA) (Pub. L. No. 109-171)
- 2006: Carl D. Perkins Career and Technical Education Improvement Act
- 2007: America COMPETES Act
- 2008: Higher Education Opportunity Act (HEOA) (Pub. L. No. 110-315)
- 2009: Race to the Top
- 2009: Student Aid and Fiscal Responsibility Act
- 2010: Health Care and Education Reconciliation Act of 2010
- Category:United States education case law

=== Health ===
- Department of Health
- 1946: Hospital Survey and Construction Act (Hill-Burton Act) PL 79-725
- 1949: Hospital Construction Act PL 81-380
- 1950: Public Health Services Act Amendments PL 81-692
- 1955: Poliomyelitis Vaccination Assistance Act PL 84-377
- 1956: Health Research Facilities Act PL 84-835
- 1960: Social Security Amendments (Kerr-Mill aid) PL 86-778
- 1961: Community Health Services and Facilities Act PL 87-395
- 1962: Public Health Service Act PL 87-838
- 1962: Vaccination Assistance PL 87-868
- 1963: Mental Retardation Facilities Construction Act/Community Mental Health Centers Act PL 88-164
- 1964: Nurse Training Act PL 88-581
- 1965: Community Health Services and Facilities Act PL 89-109
- 1965: Medicare PL 89-97
- 1965: Mental Health Centers Act Amendments PL 89-105
- 1965: Heart Disease, Cancer, and Stroke Amendments PL 89-239
- 1966: Comprehensive Health Planning and Service Act PL 89-749
- 1970: Community Mental Health Service Act PL 91-211
- 1970: Family Planning Services and Population Research Act PL 91-572
- 1970: Lead-Based Paint Poisoning Prevention Act PL 91-695
- 1971: National Cancer Act PL 92-218
- 1974: Research on Aging Act PL 93-296
- 1974: National Health Planning and Resources Development Act PL 93-641
- 1979: Department of Education Organization Act (removed education functions) PL 96-88
- 1987: Department of Transportation Appropriations Act PL 100-202
- 1988: Medicare Catastrophic Coverage Act PL 100-360
- 1989: Department of Transportation and Related Agencies Appropriations Act PL 101-164
- 1996: Health Insurance Portability and Accountability Act PL 104-191
- 2000: Child Abuse Reform and Enforcement Act P.L. 106-177
- 2010: Patient Protection and Affordable Care Act PL 111-148

=== Oil, gas and coal ===
- Coal mining in the United States
- Coal power in the United States
- Deepwater Horizon litigation
- Petroleum in the United States
- Pipeline Safety, Regulatory Certainty, and Job Creation Act of 2011
- Protecting our Infrastructure of Pipelines and Enhancing Safety (PIPES) Act of 2016

=== Energy ===
- 1920 – Federal Power Act
- Public Utility Holding Company Act of 1935, repealed
- 1946 – Atomic Energy Act PL 79-585 (created the Atomic Energy Commission)
- 1954 – Atomic Energy Act Amendments PL 83-703
- 1956 – Colorado River Storage Project PL 84-485
- 1957 – Atomic Energy Commission Acquisition of Property PL 85-162
- 1957 – Price-Anderson Nuclear Industries Indemnity Act PL 85-256
- 1968 – Natural Gas Pipeline Safety Act PL 90-481
- 1973 – Mineral Leasing Act Amendments (Trans-Alaska Oil Pipeline Authorization) PL 93-153
- 1974 – Energy Reorganization Act PL 93-438 (Split the AEC into the Energy Research and Development Administration and the Nuclear Regulatory Commission)
- 1975 – Energy Policy and Conservation Act PL 94-163
- 1977 – Department of Energy Organization Act PL 95-91 (Dismantled ERDA and replaced it with the Department of Energy)
- 1978 – National Energy Act PL 95-617, 618, 619, 620, 621
- 1980 – Energy Security Act PL 96-294
- 1989 – Natural Gas Wellhead Decontrol Act PL 101-60
- 1992 – Energy Policy Act of 1992 PL 102-486
- 2000 – National Nuclear Security Administration Act PL 106-65
- 2005 – Energy Policy Act of 2005 PL 109-58
- 2007 – Energy Independence and Security Act of 2007 PL 110-140
- 2008 – Food, Conservation, and Energy Act of 2008 PL 110-234
- Arizona Public Service Co. v. Snead
- Baltimore Gas & Elec. Co. v. Natural Resources Defense Council, Inc.
- Central Hudson Gas & Electric Corp. v. Public Service Commission
- Duke Power Co. v. Carolina Environmental Study Group
- Entergy Louisiana, Inc. v. Louisiana Public Service Commission
- Exxon Corp. v. Governor of Maryland
- Federal Power Commission v. Sierra Pacific Power Company
- Federal Power Commission v. Tuscarora Indian Nation
- Jackson v. Metropolitan Edison Co.
- Metropolitan Edison Co. v. People Against Nuclear Energy
- North American Co. v. Securities and Exchange Commission
- Pacific Gas & Electric Co. v. State Energy Resources Conservation and Development Commission
- Pacific Gas & Electric v. Public Utilities Commission
- Panama Refining Co. v. Ryan
- Phillips Petroleum Co. v. Wisconsin
- Standard Oil Company of New Jersey v. United States
- State Oil Company v. Khan
- National Audubon Society v. Superior Court
- Tennessee Valley Authority v. Hill
- Texaco Inc. v. Dagher
- United Gas Pipe Line Co. v. Ideal Cement Co.
- United Gas Pipe Line Co. v. Memphis Light, Gas, and Water Division
- United Gas Pipe Line Co. v. Mobile Gas Service Corp.
- Vermont Yankee Nuclear Power Corp. v. Natural Resources Defense Council, Inc.

=== Agriculture and environment ===
- 1890, 1891, 1897, 1906 Meat Inspection Act
- 1906: Pure Food and Drug Act
- 1914: Cotton Futures Act
- 1916: Federal Farm Loan Act
- 1917: Food Control and Production Acts
- 1921: Packers and Stockyards Act
- 1922: Grain Futures Act
- 1922: National Agricultural Conference
- 1923: Agricultural Credits Act
- 1930: Perishable Agricultural Commodities Act
- 1930: Foreign Agricultural Service Act
- 1933: Agricultural Adjustment Act (AAA)
- 1933: Farm Credit Act
- 1935: Resettlement Administration
- 1936: Soil Conservation and Domestic Allotment Act
- 1937: Agricultural Marketing Agreement Act
- 1941: National Victory Garden Program
- 1941: Steagall Amendment
- 1946: Farmers Home Administration
- 1946: National School Lunch Act PL 79-396
- 1946: Research and Marketing Act
- 1948: Hope-Aiken Agriculture Act PL 80-897
- 1956: Soil Bank Program authorized
- 1957: Poultry Inspection Act
- 1947: Federal Insecticide, Fungicide, and Rodenticide Act PL 80-104
- 1949: Agricultural Act PL 81-439 (Section 416 (b))
- 1954: Food for Peace Act PL 83-480
- 1954: Agricultural Act PL 83-690
- 1956: Mutual Security Act PL 84-726
- 1957: Poultry Products Inspection Act PL 85-172
- 1958: Food Additives Amendment PL 85-929
- 1958: Humane Slaughter Act
- 1958: Agricultural Act PL 85-835
- 1961: Agricultural Act PL 87-128
- 1964: Agricultural Act PL 88-297
- 1964: Food Stamp Act PL 88-525
- 1964: Federal Insecticide, Fungicide, and Rodenticide Act Extension PL 88-305
- 1965: Appalachian Regional Development Act
- 1965: Food and Agriculture Act PL 89-321
- 1966: Child Nutrition Act PL 89-642
- 1967: Wholesome Meat Act PL 90-201
- 1968: Wholesome Poultry Products Act PL 90-492
- 1970: Agricultural Act PL 91-524
- 1972: Federal Environmental Pesticide Control Act PL 92-516
- 1970: Environmental Quality Improvement Act
- 1970: Food Stamp Act PL 91-671
- 1972: Rural Development Act
- 1972: Rural Development Act Reform 3.31
- 1972: National School Lunch Act Amendments (Special Supplemental Nutrition Program for Women, Infants and Children) PL 92-433
- 1973: Agriculture and Consumer Protection Act PL 93-86
- 1974: Safe Drinking Water Act PL 93-523
- 1977: Food and Agriculture Act PL 95-113
- 1985: Food Security Act PL 99-198
- 1996: Federal Agriculture Improvement and Reform Act PL 104-127
- 1996: Food Quality Protection Act PL 104-170
- 2000: Agriculture Risk Protection Act PL 106-224
- 2002: Farm Security and Rural Investment Act PL 107-171
- 2008: Food, Conservation, and Energy Act of 2008 PL 110-246
- 2010: Healthy, Hunger-Free Kids Act of 2010 PL 111-296

=== Water ===
- Slaughter-House Cases, 83 U.S. 36 (1873)

=== Housing ===
- 1944 – Servicemen's Readjustment Act, Pub. L. 78–346
- 1949 – Housing Act, Pub. L. 81–171
- 1950 – Housing Act, Pub. L. 81–475
- 1951 – Defense Housing Act, Pub. L. 82–139
- 1952 – 550 Veterans Readjustment Assistance Act, Pub. L. 82–325
- 1954 – Housing Act, Pub. L. 83–560
- 1959 – Housing Act, Pub. L. 86–372
- 1962 – Senior Citizens Housing Act, Pub. L. 87–723
- 1965 – Housing and Urban Development Act, Pub. L. 89–117
- 1965 – Department of Housing and Urban Development Act, Pub. L. 89–174
- 1968 – Housing and Urban Development Act, Pub. L. 90–448
- 1974 – Housing and Urban Development Act, Pub.L. 93-383
- 1976 – Housing and Urban Development Act, Pub.L. 94-375
- 1986 – Tax Reform Act of 1986, Pub.L. 99-514
  - Low-Income Housing Tax Credit
- 1987 – Housing and Community Development Act of 1987, Pub. L. 100–242
- 1987 – Stewart B. McKinney Homeless Assistance Act, Pub. L. 100–77
- 1989 – Department of Housing and Urban Development Reform Act of 1989, Pub. L. 101–235
- 1990 – Cranston-Gonzalez National Affordable Housing Act, Pub. L. 101–625
- 1992 – Housing and Community Development Act of 1992, Pub. L. 102–550
  - Federal Housing Enterprises Financial Safety and Soundness Act of 1992, U.S. Code: Title 12, Chapter 46
- 2009 – American Recovery and Reinvestment Act of 2009, abbreviated ARRA, Pub. L. 111–5 (text) (PDF)
  - Repairing and modernizing public housing, including increasing the energy efficiency of units, $4 billion to the Department of Housing and Urban Development (HUD)

=== Transportation ===
- Department of Transportation
- 1966 – Department of Transportation established PL 89-670
- 1806 – Cumberland Road
- 1935 – Motor Carrier Act
- 1950 – Federal Aid to Highway PL 81-769
- 1956 – Federal-Aid to Highway/Interstate Highway Act PL 84-627
- 1965 – Highway Beautification Act PL 89-285
- 1973 – Federal Aid Highway Act PL 93-87
- 1980 – Motor Carrier Act PL 96-296
- 1982 – Bus Regulatory Reform Act PL 97-261
- 1862 – Pacific Railway Act
- 1887 – Interstate Commerce Act
- 1916 – Adamson Railway Labor Act
- 1970 – Rail Passenger Service Act PL 91-518
- 1973 – Amtrak Improvement Act PL 93-146
- 1976 – Railroad Revitalization and Regulatory Reform Act PL 94-210
- 1980 – Staggers Rail Act PL 96-448
- 1946 – Federal Airport Act PL 79-377
- 1957 – Airways Modernization Act PL 85-133
- 1958 – Federal Aviation Act PL 85-726
- 1959 – Airport Construction Act PL 86-72
- 1978 – Airline Deregulation Act PL 95-504
- 1970 – Airport and Airway Development Act PL 91-258
- 2000 – Wendell H. Ford Aviation Investment and Reform Act for the 21st Century PL 106-181
- 1964 – Urban Mass Transportation Act PL 88-365
- 1970 – Urban Mass Transportation Act PL 91-453
- 1974 – National Mass Transportation Assistance Act PL 93-503
- 1954 – Saint Lawrence Seaway Act
- 1958 – Transportation Act PL 85-625
- 1976 – Hart-Scott-Rodino Antitrust Improvements Act PL 94-435
- 1982 – Surface Transportation Assistance Act PL 97-424
- 1987 – Surface Transportation Act PL 100-17
- 1991 – Intermodal Surface Transportation Efficiency Act PL 102-240
- 1998 – Transportation Equity Act for the 21st Century PL 105-178
- 2002 – Homeland Security Act (PL 107-296)
- 2005 – Safe, Accountable, Flexible, Efficient Transportation Equity Act: A Legacy for Users (PL 109-59)

=== Post ===
- Postal Reorganization Act
- Postal Service Reform Act of 2022

=== Telecomms ===
- Communications Act of 1934
- Telecommunications Act of 1996
- COPE Act of 2006 (Communications Act of 2006)
- Telecommunications Act of 2005
- Comcast Corp. v. FCC
- Federal Communications Commission v. Pacifica Foundation
- Hush-A-Phone v. United States
- National Cable & Telecommunications Association v. Brand X Internet Services
- SBC Communications, Inc. v. FCC
- Schurz Communications, Incorporated v. Federal Communications Commission and United States of America
- Smith v. Maryland
- Turner Broadcasting v. Federal Communications Commission
- United States v. Southwestern Cable Co.
- USTA v. FCC (2004)
- USTA v. FCC (2016)
- Verizon Communications Inc. v. FCC (2002)
- Verizon Communications Inc. v. FCC (2014)
- Verizon Communications v. Law Offices of Curtis V. Trinko, LLP

=== Media ===
- Federal Radio Commission
- Media cross-ownership in the United States
- Public Service Broadcaster
- Federal Communications Commission v. Fox Television Stations (2009)
- Federal Communications Commission v. Fox Television Stations (2012)
- National Broadcasting Co. v. United States
- Red Lion Broadcasting Co. v. Federal Communications Commission
- NPR
- YouTube

== See also ==
- United Kingdom enterprise law
- European Union law
- Economics of the public sector
- Universal service fund
- Universal service
