= Morgan Stanley Capital Group, Inc. v. Public Utility District No. 1 =

- Supreme Court of the United States

Decided June 26, 2008
- Full case name: Morgan Stanley Capital Group, Inc. v. Public Utility District No. 1
- Citations: 554 U.S. 527 (more)

Holding
- The Mobile–Sierra presumption that a negotiated rate is "just and reasonable" applies to all contract rates even if it was not actually reviewed for reasonableness, and the presumption applies regardless of whether the rate is considered too high or too low.

Court membership
- Chief Justice John Roberts Associate Justices John P. Stevens · Antonin Scalia; Anthony Kennedy · David Souter; Clarence Thomas · Ruth Bader Ginsburg; Stephen Breyer · Samuel Alito

Case opinions
- Majority: Scalia, joined by Kennedy, Thomas, Alito; Ginsburg in part
- Concurrence: Ginsburg
- Dissent: Stevens, joined by Souter
- Roberts, Breyer took no part in the consideration or decision of the case.

Morgan Stanley Capital Group, Inc. v. Public Utility District No. 1, 554 U.S. 527 (2008), was a United States Supreme Court case in which the court held that the Mobile–Sierra presumption that a negotiated rate is "just and reasonable" applies to all contract rates even if it was not actually reviewed for reasonableness, and the presumption applies regardless of whether the rate is considered too high or too low.

== Background ==
Under the Mobile–Sierra doctrine, the Federal Energy Regulatory Commission (FERC) must presume that the electricity rate set in a freely negotiated wholesale-energy contract meets the "just and reasonable" requirement of the Federal Power Act (FPA), and the presumption may be overcome only if FERC concludes that the contract seriously harms the public interest. This presumption comes from two earlier cases, United Gas Pipe Line Co. v. Mobile Gas Service Corp. and FPC v. Sierra Pacific Power Co..

Under FERC's regulatory regime in effect when this controversy started, a wholesale electricity seller could file a "market-based" tariff, which simply stated that the utility will enter into freely negotiated contracts with purchasers. Those contracts were not filed with FERC before they went into effect. In 2000 and 2001, there was a dramatic increase in the price of electricity in the western United States. As a result, respondents entered into long-term contracts with petitioners that locked in rates that were very high by historical standards. Respondents subsequently asked FERC to modify the contracts, contending that the rates should not be presumed just and reasonable under Mobile–Sierra. The Administrative Law Judge concluded that the presumption applied and that the contracts did not seriously harm the public interest. FERC affirmed.

However, the Ninth Circuit Court of Appeals remanded. The court held that contract rates were presumptively reasonable only where FERC has had an initial opportunity to review the contracts without applying the Mobile–Sierra presumption and therefore that the presumption should not apply to contracts entered into under "market-based" tariffs. The court alternatively held that there is a different standard for overcoming the Mobile-Sierra presumption when a purchaser challenges a contract: whether the contract exceeds a "zone of reasonableness."

== Opinion of the court ==
The Supreme Court issued an opinion on June 26, 2008.

== See also ==
- NRG Power Marketing, LLC v. Maine Public Utilities Commission
