= Steagall =

Steagall is a surname of English origin, meaning "dweller by the stile". Notable people with the surname include:

- Henry B. Steagall (1873-1943), American politician
- Jay Steagall (born 1976), American politician
- Red Steagall (born 1938), American actor, musician, poet, and stage performer
- Scotty Steagall (1929-2001), American basketball player

== See also ==
- Banking Act of 1933, often referred to as the Glass-Steagall Act
- Glass–Steagall Act of 1932, a law passed by the United States Congress
- Steagall Amendment of 1941, a US federal law
- Steagall Glacier, a tributary glacier in the Queen Maud Mountains
- Stegall
- Steggall
