= List of United States Supreme Court cases, volume 558 =

This is a list of all the United States Supreme Court cases from volume 558 of the United States Reports:

Case name	Citation	Date decided
Corcoran v. Levenhagen	558 U.S. 1	2009
A court of appeal cannot reverse the District Court and direct it upon remand to deny a habeas writ without reviewing claims made by the petitioner without explaining why those claims should not be considered.
Bobby v. Van Hook	558 U.S. 4	2009
The only governing standard for ineffective assistance of counsel is Strickland v. Washington. The ABA Guidelines for lawyer conduct are evidence of what lawyer behavior is proper but not inexorable commands, and updates to the Guidelines that came later are not necessarily representative of proper lawyer conduct at the relevant time.
Wong v. Belmontes	558 U.S. 15	2009
The two prongs of Strickland v. Washington are mandatory, and the petitioner did not establish prejudice from the fact that his lawyer was unable to call more witnesses to humanize him, given the extensive evidence that he committed the murder.
Porter v. McCollum	558 U.S. 30	2009
A defense attorney's failure to investigate or present any mitigating evidence regarding a defendant's military service or his mental health deprives the defendant of the effective assistance of counsel in violation of the Sixth Amendment.
Michigan v. Fisher	558 U.S. 45	2009
The officer's belief that Fisher was injured satisfied the exigent circumstances exception to the Fourth Amendment and justified the entry into Fisher's house despite Fisher's demand that the cops stay out of his house unless they got a warrant.
Beard v. Kindler	558 U.S. 53	2009
A state procedural rule that is enforced by the state courts cannot be reviewed in federal court.
Union Pacific Railroad Co. v. Brotherhood of Locomotive Engineers	558 U.S. 67	2009
Given that nothing in the Railway Labor Act elevates to jurisdictional status the obligation to conference minor disputes or to prove conferencing, it is incorrect to treat the limited statutory grounds for relief in the act as a constitutional due process issue.
Alvarez v. Smith	558 U.S. 87	2009
Case dismissed as moot because the parties agreed that there was no longer contention over the property seized.
Mohawk Industries, Inc. v. Carpenter	558 U.S. 100	December 8, 2009
Disclosure orders adverse to attorney–client privilege do not qualify for immediate appeal.
McDaniel v. Brown	558 U.S. 120	January 11, 2010
Smith v. Spisak	558 U.S. 139	2010
Jury's consideration of mitigating circumstances may be limited to circumstances the jury found only unanimously.
NRG Power Marketing, LLC v. Me. Pub. Util. Comm'n	558 U.S. 165	2010
The Mobile–Sierra presumption does not depend on the identity of the complainant who seeks FERC investigation.
Hollingsworth v. Perry	558 U.S. 183	2010
Opponents of same-sex marriage do not have standing to intervene in litigation about the constitutionality of same-sex marriage because they cannot demonstrate that they are harmed by a court's decision about it.
Presley v. Georgia	558 U.S. 209	2010
Wellons v. Hall	558 U.S. 220	2010
Kucana v. Holder	558 U.S. 233	2010
The statute that makes certain discretionary determinations of the Attorney General immune to judicial review does not allow the Attorney General to declare determinations discretionary and immune to review via regulations.
South Carolina v. North Carolina	558 U.S. 256	2010
Wood v. Allen	558 U.S. 290	2010
The state court's conclusion that the petitioner's counsel made a strategic decision not to pursue or present evidence of his mental deficiencies was not an unreasonable determination of the facts.
Citizens United v. FEC	558 U.S. 310	2010
The provisions of the Bipartisan Campaign Reform Act of 2002 restricting unions, corporations, and profitable organizations from independent political spending and prohibiting the broadcasting of political media funded by them within sixty days of general elections or thirty days of primary elections violate the freedom of speech that is protected by the First Amendment to the Constitution of the United States.
