= NRG Power Marketing, LLC v. Maine Public Utilities Commission =

- Supreme Court of the United States

Decided December 8, 2009
- Full case name: NRG Power Marketing, Limited Liability Company v. Maine Public Utilities Commission
- Citations: 558 U.S. 165 (more)

Holding
- The Mobile–Sierra presumption does not depend on the identity of the complainant who seeks FERC investigation.

Court membership
- Chief Justice John Roberts Associate Justices John P. Stevens · Antonin Scalia; Anthony Kennedy · Clarence Thomas; Ruth Bader Ginsburg · Stephen Breyer; Samuel Alito · Sonia Sotomayor

Case opinions
- Majority: Ginsburg
- Dissent: Stevens

NRG Power Marketing, LLC v. Maine Public Utilities Commission, 558 U.S. 165 (2009), was a United States Supreme Court case in which the court held that the Mobile–Sierra presumption does not depend on the identity of the complainant who seeks Federal Energy Regulatory Commission (FERC) investigation.

== Background ==
The Mobile–Sierra presumption was established by the Supreme Court in the cases United Gas Pipe Line Co. v. Mobile Gas Service Corp. and FPC v. Sierra Pacific Power Co.. The presumption requires FERC to presume that an electricity rate set by a freely negotiated wholesale-energy contract meets the Federal Power Act's (FPA) "just and reasonable" prescription; the presumption may be overcome only if FERC concludes that the contract seriously harms the public interest.

For many years, New England's supply of electricity capacity was barely sufficient to meet the region's demand. FERC and New England's generators, electricity providers, and power customers made several attempts to address the problem. This case arose from an effort to design a solution. Concerned parties reached a comprehensive settlement agreement that, among other things, established rate-setting mechanisms for sales of energy capacity and provided that the Mobile–Sierra public interest standard would govern rate challenges. FERC approved the agreement, finding that it presents a just and reasonable outcome that is consistent with the public interest. Objectors to the settlement sought review in the D.C. Circuit, which largely rejected their efforts to overturn FERC's approval order, but agreed with them that when a challenge to a contract rate was brought by non-contracting third-parties, the Mobile–Sierra's presumption did not apply.

== See also ==
- Morgan Stanley Capital Group, Inc. v. Public Utility District No. 1
