= Travelers Casualty & Surety Co. of America v. Pacific Gas & Electric Co. =

Travelers Casualty & Surety Co. of America v. Pacific Gas & Elec. Co.
- Supreme Court of the United States

Argued January 16, 2007 Decided March 20, 2007
- Full case name: Travelers Casualty & Surety Company of America, Petitioner v. Pacific Gas & Electric Company
- Docket no.: 05-1429
- Citations: 549 U.S. 443 (more) 127 S. Ct. 1199; 167 L. Ed. 2d 178; 2007 U.S. LEXIS 3566; 75 U.S.L.W. 4131; Bankr. L. Rep. (CCH) ¶ 80,880; 57 Collier Bankr. Cas. 2d (MB) 314; 47 Bankr. Ct. Dec. 265

Holding
- Federal bankruptcy law does not disallow unsecured contract-based claims for attorney’s fees based solely on the fact that the fees were incurred litigating bankruptcy law issues.

Court membership
- Chief Justice John Roberts Associate Justices John P. Stevens · Antonin Scalia; Anthony Kennedy · David Souter; Clarence Thomas · Ruth Bader Ginsburg; Stephen Breyer · Samuel Alito

Case opinion
- Majority: Alito, joined by unanimous

Laws applied
- Bankruptcy Code

Travelers Casualty & Surety Co. of America v. Pacific Gas & Elec. Co., 549 U.S. 443 (2007), was a United States Supreme Court case about attorney's fees in bankruptcy cases. Justice Samuel Alito wrote the opinion for a unanimous court.

== Background ==
Before they declared bankruptcy, Pacific Gas & Electric Company (PG&E) purchased surety bonds from Travelers, an insurance company. The bonds obliged Travelers to settle debts PG&E couldn't repay. When PG&E filed a voluntary Chapter 11 bankruptcy petition on April 6, 2001 as a result of the California electricity crisis, Travelers hired attorneys to protect its interests. California law mandated that PG&E cover all attorney fees incurred by Travelers during state court proceedings. The litigation later moved to federal court, where PG&E refused to pay for Travelers' federal court expenses, claiming they were only responsible for fees incurred during state court proceedings.

=== Procedural history ===
The bankruptcy court denied Travelers' request for reimbursement because the federal precedents in the Ninth Circuit held that only federal laws could ensure payment for federal litigation. PG&E was only under contractual and legal obligation to pay for state-court attorney fees, not federal-court fees. The District Court and the Ninth Circuit denied Travelers' claim on the same grounds. Travelers appealed to the Supreme Court, and the Supreme Court granted certiorari, seeking to resolve an inconsistency among the circuit courts.

== Decision ==
=== Issue ===
Can an unsecured creditor in a bankruptcy case collect attorneys' fees authorized by a contract and incurred in postpetition litigation where such a contractual obligation is guaranteed under a state law?

=== Opinion ===
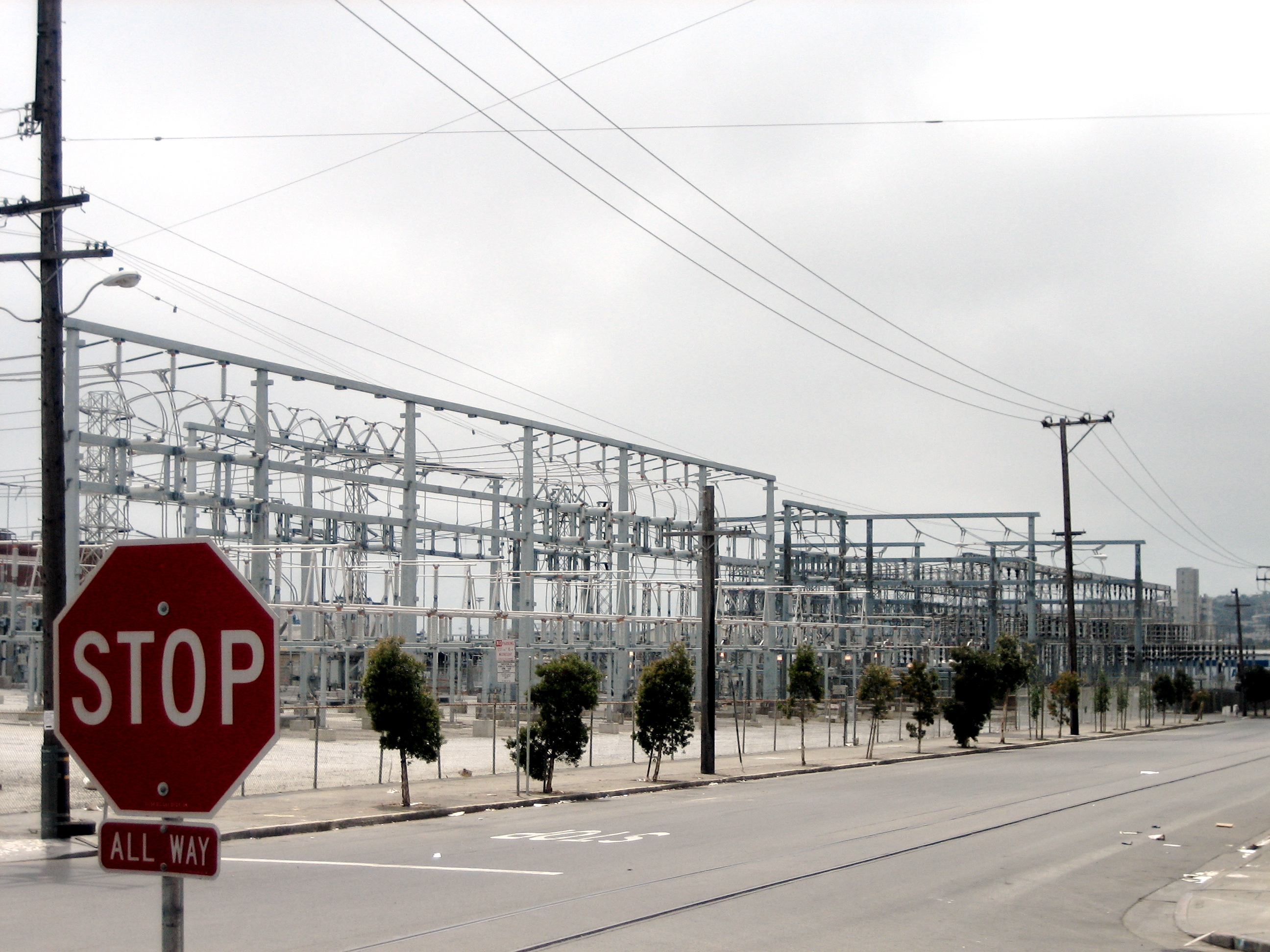
PG&E yard in San Francisco

Justice Alito issued the Court's unanimous opinion, holding that "an otherwise enforceable contract allocating attorney’s fees ... is allowable in bankruptcy except where the Bankruptcy Code provides otherwise." Because the Bankruptcy Code "says nothing about unsecured claims for contractual attorney's fees incurred while litigating issues of bankruptcy law," the Court could "presume that claims enforceable under applicable state law will be allowed in bankruptcy unless they are expressly disallowed."

The Court found that none of the nine exemptions waiving contractual obligation to reimburse attorney fees set forth in 11 U.S.C. § 502(b) applied to Travelers, and therefore nothing undermined the debtor's contractual or state-law obligation to pay. The idea that state-law or contractual claims for attorneys' fees are unenforceable in federal bankruptcy proceedings, Alito wrote, "finds no support in the Bankruptcy Code, either in §502 or elsewhere."

== See also ==
- Baylis v. Travelers' Insurance Company (1885)
- Pacific Gas & Electric v. Public Utilities Commission (1986)
- Pacific Gas & Electric Co. v. State Energy Resources Conservation and Development Commission (1983)
