= United Gas Pipe Line Co. v. Ideal Cement Co. =

- Supreme Court of the United States

Argued December 13, 1961 Decided March 19, 1962
- Full case name: United Gas Pipe Line Co. v. Ideal Cement Co., et al.
- Citations: 369 U.S. 134 (more) 82 S.Ct. 623, 7 L. Ed. 2d 623, 1962 U.S. LEXIS 1599

Case history
- Prior: 176 F. Supp. 748 (S.D. Ala. 1959) (summary judgment for pipeline company); 282 F.2d 574 (5th Cir. 1960) (reversing district court).

Holding
- Federal court should abstain from ruling on the constitutionality of an unresolved state tax issue

Court membership
- Chief Justice Earl Warren Associate Justices Hugo Black · Felix Frankfurter; William O. Douglas · Tom C. Clark; John M. Harlan II · William J. Brennan Jr. Charles E. Whittaker · Potter Stewart

Case opinions
- Per curiam
- Concurrence: Douglas
- Dissent: Harlan
- Whittaker took no part in the consideration or decision of the case.

United Gas Pipe Line Co. v. Ideal Cement Co., 369 U.S. 134 (1962), is a United States Supreme Court case which vacated a lower appellate court decision, holding that federal courts should abstain from ruling on the constitutionality of a state tax issue that state courts should determine.

== Background ==
The United Gas Pipe Line Company operates three interstate natural gas pipelines that connect to a station located in Mobile, Alabama, where the gas is reduced in pressure and is distributed using a system operated by the Mobile Gas Service Corporation. United Gas had contracts to provide gas to two industrial facilities owned by the Ideal Cement Company and the Scott Paper Company, each with clauses that the customer would reimburse United Gas for any taxes it paid for providing gas. The City of Mobile has an ordinance requiring a license to conduct a business for the sale of natural gas within the city involving a payment of 1.5% of gross receipts. United Gas, which is incorporated in Delaware, reimbursed Mobile Gas for the amount it paid to the city for the gas deliveries made to Ideal Cement and Scott Paper, and then filed suit in federal court based upon diversity jurisdiction for recovery of that amount from Ideal Cement and Scott Paper. At issue in the case was whether the city license represented a tax and whether it constituted a precondition to conduct interstate trade in violation of the Commerce Clause of the United States Constitution. The federal district court granted summary judgment in favor of United Gas based upon the tax provision of the contracts, but the Court of Appeals for the Fifth Circuit reversed the district court based upon the constitutional issue. The Supreme Court granted certiorari.

== Opinion ==
In a per curiam decision, the Supreme Court vacated the opinion of the court of appeals, noting that the Alabama Supreme Court had never provided a construction of the city ordinance. Since the state court was the authoritative forum for interpreting the ordinance and determining whether it was a tax, the Court ruled that adjudication of the federal constitutional issue should wait while the construction of the city ordinance could be sought by the parties in state court.

In a concurring opinion, Justice Douglas indicated that the ordinance was a tax on intrastate activities and he would reverse the court of appeals decision on that basis.

Justice Harlan wrote a dissenting opinion which stated that the interpretation of the city ordinance in state courts would not determine the federal constitutional issue. He stated that he would adjudicate that issue instead now.

== Analysis ==
Although unstated or cited in the Supreme Court opinion, this case involves an application of the Pullman abstention doctrine from Railroad Commission v. Pullman Co. (1941). That case holds that federal courts should not adjudicate the constitutionality of an ambiguous state statute fairly open to interpretation until courts in that state have been afforded a reasonable opportunity to rule on the proper statutory construction. Pullman abstention applies even when there is no pending state case, which was the situation here in Ideal Cement since there was no active Alabama state court case involving the city ordinance.

The provision of natural gas to the Ideal Cement plant was also the subject of a prior Supreme Court case, United Gas Pipe Line Co. v. Mobile Gas Service Corp. (1956). The issue in that case was whether United Gas could increase the contract rate for natural gas to the cement plant by unilaterally filing a new rate schedule with the Federal Power Commission. The Supreme Court in that case held that the Natural Gas Act of 1938 (NGA) did not authorize the abrogation of contracts, so the new rate schedule could not change the rate for the gas for the cement plant. This case, along with Federal Power Commission v. Sierra Pacific Power Co. (1956) established the Mobile-Sierra doctrine in U.S. administrative law, which holds that an electricity or natural gas supply rate established resulting from a freely negotiated contract is presumed to be "just and reasonable" and thus acceptable under the NGA or Federal Power Act.

== See also ==
- List of United States Supreme Court cases, volume 369
