= Stegall =

Stegall may refer to:

== People ==
- Caleb Stegall (born 1971), American attorney and writer
- Casey Stegall (born 1979), network correspondent for Fox News Channel, based in Los Angeles
- Gill Stegall (1961–1988), American football player
- Keith Stegall (born 1955), American country music recording artist and record producer
- Milt Stegall (born 1970), retired professional gridiron football player
- Red Steagall or Red Stegall (born 1938), American actor, musician, poet, and stage performer
- Sarah Stegall, contributor to SFScope, an online trade journal devoted to entertainment news

== Places ==
- Stegall, Arkansas, unincorporated community in Jackson County, Arkansas, United States

== See also ==
- Glass–Steagall Legislation
- STEGAL
- Stagg Hall
- Steggall
- Steagall
