= Per curiam decision =

Court ruling which does not identify author

In law, a per curiam decision or opinion (sometimes called an unsigned opinion) is one that is not authored by or attributed to a specific judge, but rather ascribed to the entire court or panel of judges who heard the case. The term per curiam is Latin for 'by the court'.

== United States ==
=== Federal ===
The decisions of the U.S. Supreme Court are generally not per curiam, with exceptions. Their decisions more commonly take the form of one or more opinions signed by individual justices which are then joined in by other justices. Unanimous and signed opinions are not considered per curiam decisions, as only the court can officially designate opinions as per curiam. Per curiam decisions tend to be short. In modern practice, they are most commonly used in summary decisions that the Court resolves without full argument and briefing. The designation is stated at the beginning of the opinion. Single-line per curiam decisions are also issued without concurrence or dissent by a hung Supreme Court (a 4–4 decision), when the Court has a vacant seat.

The notable exceptions to the usual characteristics for a per curiam decision are the cases of New York Times Co. v. United States, Bush v. Gore, and Trump v. Anderson. Although they were per curiam, each had multiple concurrences and dissents.

Examples include:

- Ex parte Quirin, 317 U.S. 1 (1942)
- Ray v. Blair, 343 U.S. 214 (1952)
- Toolson v. New York Yankees, 346 U.S. 356 (1953)
- One, Inc. v. Olesen, 355 U.S. 371 (1958)
- Cooper v. Aaron, 358 U.S. 1 (1958)
- Dusky v. United States, 362 U.S. 402 (1960)
- Brandenburg v. Ohio, 395 U.S. 444 (1969)
- Alexander v. Holmes County Board of Education, 396 U.S. 19 (1969)
- New York Times Co. v. United States, 403 U.S. 713 (1971)
- Furman v. Georgia, 408 U.S. 238 (1972)
- City of New Orleans v. Dukes, 427 U.S. 297 (1976)
- Buckley v. Valeo, 424 U.S. 1 (1976)
- Bush v. Gore, 531 U.S. 98 (2000)
- Los Angeles County v. Rettele, 550 U.S. 609 (2007)
- American Tradition Partnership, Inc. v. Bullock, 567 U.S. 517 (2012)
- Trump v. Anderson, No. 23-719, 601 U.S. ___ (2024)
- TikTok v. Garland, No. 24–656, 604 U.S. ___ (2025)

The per curiam practices of the individual United States Courts of Appeals vary by judicial circuit. The Second Circuit, for instance, issues its nonprecedential decisions as "summary orders" that do not designate an author but are also not labeled as per curiam opinions; occasionally, the court will issue precedential decisions with a per curiam designation. In the Third Circuit, by contrast, the majority of both precedential and nonprecedential decisions indicate the authoring judge, and the per curiam designation is generally, but not exclusively, reserved for dispositions on the court's pro se and summary action calendar.

=== State ===
The Supreme Court of California occasionally releases decisions in the name of "The Court" but they are not necessarily unanimous. Sometimes, they are accompanied by extensive concurring and dissenting opinions.

The Supreme Court of Florida frequently releases death penalty opinions in a per curiam form, even if there are concurring and dissenting opinions to the majority.

Many decisions of the New York Supreme Court, Appellate Division, especially in the First and Second Judicial Departments, do not designate an author. Across the Departments, the per curiam designation is used in attorney disciplinary decisions.

== Canada ==
The Supreme Court of Canada uses the term "The Court" ("La Cour" in the French versions) instead of per curiam. The practice began around 1979 by Chief Justice Laskin, borrowing from the US Supreme Court practice of anonymizing certain unanimous decisions.

However, unlike US courts, which use per curiam primarily for uncontroversial cases, the Supreme Court tends to attribute decisions to "The Court" in important and controversial cases, to emphasize that the Court is speaking with one voice.
