= Public Utilities Commission of the District of Columbia v. Pollak =

- Supreme Court of the United States

Argued March 3, 1952 Decided May 26, 1952
- Full case name: Public Utilities Commission of the District of Columbia et al. v. Pollak et al.
- Citations: 343 U.S. 451 (more) 72 S. Ct. 813, 96 L. Ed. 1068; 1952 U.S. LEXIS 2061

Case history
- Prior: 191 F.2d 450 (D.C. Cir. 1951); cert. granted, 342 U.S. 848 (1951).

Holding
- the playing of radio programs on street cars and busses of a public utility did not violate the First or Fifth Amendments to the U.S. Constitution

Court membership
- Chief Justice Fred M. Vinson Associate Justices Hugo Black · Stanley F. Reed; Felix Frankfurter · William O. Douglas; Robert H. Jackson · Harold H. Burton; Tom C. Clark · Sherman Minton

Case opinions
- Majority: Burton, joined by Vinson, Reed, Jackson, Clark, Minton,
- Concurrence: Black
- Dissent: Douglas
- Frankfurter took no part in the consideration or decision of the case.

Laws applied
- U.S. Constitution, 1st and 5th Amendments

Public Utility Commission of the District of Columbia v. Pollak, 343 U.S. 451 (1952), is a United States Supreme Court decision which held that the playing of radio programs on street cars and busses of a transit system regulated by the government as a public utility did not violate the First or Fifth Amendments to the United States Constitution.

== Background ==
The Capital Transit Company was a privately owned public utility that operated a street car and bus transit system in the District of Columbia. After conducting a rider test, Capital Transit in 1949 installed a system to play radio programs provided under a contract with local radio station WWDC in return for compensation.

In July 1949, the Public Utility Commission of the District of Columbia (now the D.C. Public Service Commission), which regulates public utilities within D.C., opened an investigation to determine whether the playing of the radio programs was "consistent with the public convenience, comfort, and safety." Pollak and Martin, who were two protesting Capital Transit customers, intervened in the administrative proceeding. After several hearings, the Public Utilities Commission determined that the playing of radio programming was not inconsistent with public convenience, comfort, and safety. Pollak and Martin appealed the Commission decision to the U.S. District Court for D.C., which dismissed the case. Pollak and Martin then appealed to the Court of Appeals for D.C., which reversed and gave instructions for the district court to vacate the Commission decision. The Supreme Court then granted certiorari for consideration of case given its novelty and its importance to the public.

== Decision ==
The majority opinion by Justice Burton that the playing of music with occasional announcements that were explanatory and commendatory of Capital Transit's services did not violate the First Amendment's protection of Freedom of Speech as there were no claims that the programming included objectionable propaganda, and the playing of music did not interfere with the conversations of the passengers. There was also no violation of the Fifth Amendment as the Due Process Clause did not guarantee a right of privacy in public transit equivalent to that in a person's own home or vehicle. As the liberty of each person in a public place or vehicle is subject to reasonable limitations in relation to the rights of others, the conclusion of the Public Utilities Commission that the playing of music on a transit system was "consistent with the public convenience, comfort, and safety" was upheld as meeting the requirements of both substantive and procedural due process.

Justice Frankfurter, who indicated that he had been a "victim" of the playing of music on the transit system, did not participate in the case.

=== Concurrence ===
Justice Black in a concurring opinion, while agreeing with the majority opinion's holdings, stated that if the transit system played news, speeches, views, or propaganda of any sort, it would violate the First Amendment.

=== Dissent ===
Justice Douglas in his dissenting opinion argued that the playing of music to a captive audience in public transit was contrary to the concept of liberty under the First Amendment's guarantee of Freedom of Speech and that of privacy under the Fifth Amendment.

== Subsequent events ==
The Supreme Court would later review a portion of the Pollak ruling in Jackson v. Metropolitan Edison Co., a case where the issue was whether extensive state regulation made the actions of a public utility a state action that was reviewable under the Fourteenth Amendment. The Jackson opinion noted that the Court in Pollak did not determine whether the playing of the radio programs on the regulated transit system constituted state action as a result of the regulation by the D.C. Public Utilities Commission, but simply assumed state action for the purposes of evaluating the constitutional questions.
