= Washington Public Utilities Commission =

Washington Public Utilities Commission or Washington Public Service Commission may refer to:

- District of Columbia Public Service Commission, in Washington, D.C.
- Washington Utilities and Transportation Commission, in Washington State
