= Cammarano v. United States =

- Supreme Court of the United States

Argued November 19, 1958 Decided February 24, 1959
- Full case name: Cammarano, et ux. v. United States
- Citations: 358 U.S. 498 (more) 79 S. Ct. 524; 3 L. Ed. 2d 462; 1959 U.S. LEXIS 1924; 59-1 U.S. Tax Cas. (CCH) ¶ 9262; 3 A.F.T.R.2d (RIA) 697; 1959-1 C.B. 666

Court membership
- Chief Justice Earl Warren Associate Justices Hugo Black · Felix Frankfurter; William O. Douglas · Tom C. Clark; John M. Harlan II · William J. Brennan Jr. Charles E. Whittaker · Potter Stewart

Case opinions
- Majority: Harlan, joined by unanimous
- Concurrence: Douglas

Cammarano v. United States, 358 U.S. 498 (1959), was a United States Supreme Court case in which the Court ruled that business may not deduct expenses they incurred for the "promotion or defeat of legislation" as "ordinary and necessary" business expenses on their federal income tax filing.

== Opinion of the Court ==
In a unanimous opinion written by Justice John Marshall Harlan II, the Court held that "purchased publicity can influence the fate of legislation which will affect, directly or indirectly, all in the community," and therefore "everyone in the community should stand on the same footing as regards its purchase". Justice William O. Douglas filed a concurring opinion; he criticized the argument that "First Amendment rights are somehow not fully realized unless they are subsidized by the State", noting that the argument "may indeed conflict with the underlying premise that a complete hands-off policy on the part of government is at times the only course consistent with First Amendment rights."

== See also ==
- List of United States Supreme Court cases
- List of United States Supreme Court cases, volume 358
