= Pacific Gas & Electric Co. v. State Energy Resources Conservation & Development Commission =

Pacific Gas & Electric Co. v. State Energy Resources Conservation and Development Commission
- Supreme Court of the United States

Argued January 17, 1983 Decided April 20, 1983
- Full case name: Pacific Gas & Electric Co., et al. v. State Energy Resources Conservation and Development Commission, et al.
- Citations: 461 U.S. 190 (more) 103 S. Ct. 1713; 75 L. Ed. 2d 752; 1983 U.S. LEXIS 25

Case history
- Prior: Pacific Legal Found. v. State Energy Resources Conservation & Dev. Comm'n, 472 F. Supp. 191 (S.D. Cal. 1979); Pacific Gas & Electric Co. v. State Energy Resources Conservation & Dev. Comm'n, 489 F. Supp. 699 (E.D. Cal. 1980); reversed, Pacific Legal Found. v. State Energy Resources Conservation & Dev. Comm'n, 659 F.2d 903 (9th Cir. 1982); cert. granted, 457 U.S. 1132 (1982).

Holding
- States are not preempted by the Atomic Energy Act of 1954 from enacting a moratorium on new nuclear generating plants until the federal government has approved and there exists a means for the disposal of high-level radiological waste.

Court membership
- Chief Justice Warren E. Burger Associate Justices William J. Brennan Jr. · Byron White; Thurgood Marshall · Harry Blackmun; Lewis F. Powell Jr. · William Rehnquist; John P. Stevens · Sandra Day O'Connor

Case opinions
- Majority: White, joined by Burger, Brennan, Marshall, Powell, Rehnquist, O'Connor
- Concurrence: Blackmun, joined by Stevens

Laws applied
- Atomic Energy Act of 1954, 42 U.S.C. §§ 2011-2282; Cal. Pub. Res. Code § 25524.1(b)

Pacific Gas & Electric Co. v. State Energy Resources Conservation & Development Commission, 461 U.S. 190 (1983), is a United States Supreme Court holding that a state statute regulating economic aspects of nuclear generating plants was not preempted by the federal Atomic Energy Act of 1954. The Court's opinion provided a framework that has guided other cases involving preemption of federal authority.

== Background ==
The radioactive waste fuel in a nuclear reactor must be periodically removed. Because nuclear power plant operators originally assumed that the fuel would be reprocessed, storage pools made to hold it were relatively limited in capacity and design. Over time, however, it became clear that the fuel would not be reprocessed. This resulted in large stores of radioactive waste. As a result, as Justice Byron White would note in his majority opinion, "problems of how and whereto store nuclear wastes [] engendered considerable scientific, political, and public debate."

Responding to these concerns, California in 1974 enacted the Warren-Alquist State Energy Resources Conservation and Development Act. Under the act, which was amended in 1976 to add new regulations, operators of nuclear and certain other power plants had to apply for certification by the new State Energy Resources Conservation and Development Commission, or "Energy Commission" for short. Two sections in particular became the subject of dispute:

- Section 25524.1(b) provided that the Energy Commission had the authority to determine, prior to the building of a new nuclear power plant, that there would be adequate storage space for the spent fuel rods "at the time such nuclear facility requires such storage."
- Section 25524.2 addressed long-term concerns arising from nuclear wastes by placing a moratorium, or stoppage, on the certification of new plants until the Energy Commission "finds that there has been developed and that the United States through its authorized agency has approved and there exists a demonstrated technology or means for the disposal of high-level nuclear waste."

Two California public utilities, Pacific Gas and Electric and San Diego Gas & Electric Companies, filed an action in federal district court seeking a declaratory judgment that these two provisions of the Warren-Alquist act (as well as various others) were invalid under the Supremacy Clause of the United States Constitution because they were preempted by (conflicted with) the Atomic Energy Act. The federal district court agreed.

The Ninth Circuit held that:

- Petitioners had standing to challenge the statute (upholding the district court),
- 25524.1(b), regarding spent fuel storage, was not ripe for review (overturning the district court). The reason given for this was that "we cannot know whether the Energy Commission will ever find a nuclear plant's storage capacity to be inadequate."
- 25524.2, creating the moratorium, was not preempted (overturning the district court), because sections 271 and 274(k) of the Atomic Energy Act authorized the states to regulate nuclear power plants "for purposes other than protection against radiation hazards," which is what the section did: it dealt with economic aspects of the nuclear fuel cycle, and was not designed to provide protection against radiation hazards.

The Supreme Court granted certiorari. The Court of Appeals for the Ninth Circuit had also consolidated another federal district court case, Pacific Legal Foundation v. State Energy Resources Conservation and Development Commission, which challenged other portions of the California statute, into the Pacific Gas case. Although this second case gave the Ninth Circuit decision its name, the Supreme Court denied certiorari on that case's portion of the appellate decision.

== Decision ==
The Supreme Court affirmed unanimously. Justice Byron White wrote a majority opinion joined by six other justices, while Justice Harry Blackmun wrote a concurrence in part and in the judgment joined by Justice John Paul Stevens.

=== Ripeness ===
First, White affirmed the Ninth Circuit's reasoning that Section 25524.1(b) (regarding spent fuel storage) was not ripe for review, while Section 25524.2 (instituting a moratorium on the creation of new nuclear power plants) was ripe for review. He wrote that "a court should not stretch to reach an early, and perhaps a premature, decision regarding § 25524.1(b)" because "we cannot know whether the Energy Commission will ever find a nuclear plant's storage capacity to be inadequate" (quoting the Ninth Circuit in the second instance). He held Section 25524.2 ripe, however, because "to require the industry to proceed without knowing whether the moratorium is valid would impose a palpable and considerable hardship on the utilities, and may ultimately work harm on the citizens of California" because "for the utilities to proceed in hopes that, when the time for certification came, either the required findings would be made or the law would be struck down, requires the expenditures of millions of dollars over a number of years, without any certainty of recovery if certification were denied."

=== Preemption ===
White briefly set out the legal framework for preemption. Quoting 1982 Supreme Court case Fidelity Federal Savings & Loan Assn. v. De la Cuesta, he wrote that "Absent explicit pre-emptive language, Congress' intent to supersede state law altogether may be found from a 'scheme of federal regulation . . . so pervasive as to make reasonable the inference that Congress left no room for the States to supplement it,' because 'the Act of Congress may touch a field in which the federal interest is so dominant that the federal system will be assumed to preclude enforcement of state laws on the same subject,' or because 'the object sought to be obtained by the federal law and the character of obligations imposed by it may reveal the same purpose.'" He then noted that "'even where Congress has not entirely displaced state regulation in a specific area, state law is pre-empted to the extent that it actually conflicts with federal law", and stated that "such a conflict arises when 'compliance with both federal and state regulations is a physical impossibility,' or where state law 'stands as an obstacle to the accomplishment and execution of the full purposes and objectives of Congress'", quoting respectively the 1963 and 1941 Supreme Court cases Florida Lime & Avocado Growers, Inc. v. Paul and Hines v. Davidowitz.

White then concluded that Section 25524.2 was not preempted by the Atomic Energy Act. From the time the act was passed in 1954 until the present, he wrote, Congress had maintained a system of dual regulation over nuclear plants: the federal government held control over safety issues, whereas the states exercised "their traditional authority over economic questions such as the need for additional generating capacity, the type of generating facilities to be licensed, land use, and ratemaking." He held that Section 25524.2 was directed toward economics, rather than safety, in its purpose and thus was fully within California's authority.

White also held that Section 25524.2 did not in any way conflict with national policy, even with a decision by the Nuclear Regulatory Commission (NRC) to allow continued licensing of reactors despite concerns regarding waste disposal. The NRC's authority, as that of a federal nuclear regulatory agency, was in the realm of safety, leaving states to make economic determinations regarding nuclear power. White wrote, "as there is no attempt on California's part to enter the field of developing and licensing nuclear waste disposal technology, a field occupied by the Federal Government, § 25524.2 is not preempted any more by the NRC's obligations in the waste disposal field than by its licensing power over the plants themselves." Furthermore, the 1982 Nuclear Waste Policy Act did not appear to have been passed with the intention of superseding states' decision-making power with regard to waste disposal and the opening of new plants.

Finally, White held that Section 25524.2 did not in any way operate at cross purposes to the aim embodied in the Atomic Energy Act of developing commercial uses for nuclear power. As the Ninth Circuit had observed, he wrote, "promotion of nuclear power is not to be accomplished 'at all costs.'" Instead, Congress had given the states authority to decide whether to build a nuclear plant or one using traditional fuel sources. "California's decision to exercise that authority does not, in itself, constitute a basis for preemption."

== Concurrence in part ==
Justice Blackmun concurred in part and in the judgment. He took issue, however, with the idea implicit in White's argument that a state motivated solely by safety concerns, rather than economic ones, lacked the authority to prohibit the construction of nuclear plants. He then addressed the three reasons why White had held that a safety-motivated decision to prohibit construction would be preempted: first, with respect to the argument that "the Federal Government has occupied the entire field of nuclear safety", he argued that Congress had not attempted to control the wide field of "nuclear safety concerns," only the smaller realm of safe plant construction and operation. Thus, if the federal government attempted to preempt the states, given the fact that its area of authority was not large enough to cover all contingencies, this would create a "regulatory vacuum." Next, he addressed the claim that a state judgment on safety would place a state in conflict with the NRC. He argued that while the NRC had authority to determine whether it was safe for construction of a plant to proceed, it was not in a position to order that such construction take place. Finally, he addressed the claim that a state moratorium on further plant construction would obstruct the Atomic Energy Act's objective "to insure that nuclear technology be safe enough for widespread development and use", maintaining that the federal government's policy of encouraging nuclear development should not be interpreted as an attempt to prevent states from developing alternative sources of energy.

== Subsequent developments ==
In 1972, the Supreme Court affirmed a decision of the Court of Appeals for the Eighth Circuit, Northern States Power Co. v. Minnesota, which held that attempts by states to regulate radiation hazards were preempted by the Atomic Energy Act. However, this affirmation was by memorandum without a written opinion. As such, Pacific Gas is more often cited for the proposition that states are preempted from regulating the safety aspects and radiological hazards of nuclear power plants.

Later Supreme Court cases related to the politics of nuclear power include 1983's Metropolitan Edison Co. v. People Against Nuclear Energy and 1984's Silkwood v. Kerr-McGee Corp.

== Critical response ==
Justice White's majority opinion did not question California's assertion that the moratorium was justified because the lack of a permanent disposal method for high level waste made nuclear generation uneconomic. It has been noted that existing plants and plants constructed after the Supreme Court decision have continued to economically operate by expanding current waste storage facilities. In addition, by simply citing examples of the costs of cancelled nuclear construction projects such as WNP-3 and WNP-5 or Marble Hill, or of cost over-runs at plants such as Braidwood, a state could potentially justify a statutory moratorium on all new nuclear power plants on the basis that these plants are inherently uneconomic.

In the 1984 Supreme Court case Silkwood v. Kerr-McGee Corp., which was decided the year after Pacific Gas, the Supreme Court ruled that the Atomic Energy Act did not preempt the award of punitive damages for state tort claims involving radioactive contamination. Silkwood has been criticized as inconsistent with Pacific Gas, as the purpose of the punitive damages awarded in Silkwood was to punish and to alter conduct involving the safety of radiological controls, giving the state some power of regulation over these activities through tort law.

== See also ==
- Pacific Gas & Electric v. Public Utilities Commission
- Travelers Casualty & Surety Co. of America v. Pacific Gas & Elec. Co.
- List of United States Supreme Court cases, volume 461
