= List of United States Supreme Court cases, volume 369 =

This is a list of all the United States Supreme Court cases from volume 369 of the United States Reports:

Case name	Citation	Date decided
Richards v. United States	369 U.S. 1	1962
Retail Clerks v. Lion Dry Goods, Inc.	369 U.S. 17	1962
The term "contracts," as used in § 301(a), is not limited to collective bargaining agreements concerning hours, wages and conditions of employment concluded in direct negotiations between employers and unions entitled to recognition as exclusive bargaining representatives of employees; it applies also to agreements between employers and labor organizations which importantly and directly affect the employment relationship.
Bailey v. Patterson	369 U.S. 31	1962
In re Shuttlesworth	369 U.S. 35	1962
Strelich v. Heinze	369 U.S. 36	1962
Appeal dismissed for want of a substantial federal question.
Harper v. Bannan	369 U.S. 36	1962
Certiorari denied and appeal dismissed without further comment.
Eastern Express, Inc. v. United States	369 U.S. 37	1962
Motions to affirm granted and judgment affirmed without further comment.
Simonson v. Granquist	369 U.S. 38	1962
Section 57j of the Bankruptcy Act bars allowance of a claim against the estate of a bankrupt in favor of the United States for federal statutory tax penalties, even though a lien therefor has been perfected prior to filing of the petition in bankruptcy.
Metlakatla Indian Community v. Egan	369 U.S. 45	1962
Village of Kake v. Egan	369 U.S. 60	1962
Griggs v. Allegheny Cnty.	369 U.S. 84	1962
Teamsters v. Lucas Flour Co.	369 U.S. 95	1962
Public Affairs Assocs., Inc. v. Rickover	369 U.S. 111	1962
Illinois C.R.R. Co. v. Shively	369 U.S. 120	1962
DiBella v. United States	369 U.S. 121	1962
United Gas Pipe Line Co. v. Ideal Cement Co.	369 U.S. 134	1962
Fong Foo v. United States	369 U.S. 141	1962
Benz v. New York State Thruway Auth.	369 U.S. 147	1962
McNeill v. Carroll	369 U.S. 149	1962
New York Mobile Homes Ass'n v. Steckel	369 U.S. 150	1962
Harding v. Hand	369 U.S. 151	1962
Harvey v. Smyth	369 U.S. 152	1962
Kesler v. Department of Pub. Safety	369 U.S. 153	1962
Baker v. Carr	369 U.S. 186	1962
Turner v. Memphis	369 U.S. 350	1962
Atlantic & Gulf Stevedores, Inc. v. Ellerman Lines, Ltd.	369 U.S. 355	1962
Rusk v. Cort	369 U.S. 367	1962
In re Zipkin	369 U.S. 400	1962
Cross v. Florida	369 U.S. 400	1962
Grant v. United States	369 U.S. 401	1962
Murphy v. United States	369 U.S. 402	1962
Greene v. United States	369 U.S. 403	1962
NLRB v. Walton Mfg. Co.	369 U.S. 404	1962
Kerr S.S. Co. v. United States	369 U.S. 422	1962
General Fin. Corp. v. Archetto	369 U.S. 423	1962
Brown v. Ketch	369 U.S. 423	1962
Managed Funds, Inc. v. Brouk	369 U.S. 424	1962
Smith v. Bennett	369 U.S. 425	1962
Grabina v. United States	369 U.S. 426	1962
Warren v. Larson	369 U.S. 427	1962
New York ex rel. Anonymous v. LaBurt	369 U.S. 428	1962
Scholle v. Hare	369 U.S. 429	1962
Byrnes v. Walker	369 U.S. 436	1962
Ragan v. Cox	369 U.S. 437	1962
Coppedge v. United States	369 U.S. 438	1962
Goldlawr, Inc. v. Heiman	369 U.S. 463	1962
Dairy Queen, Inc. v. Wood	369 U.S. 469	1962
A jury is competent to decide the legal issue of damages stemming from breach of contract or trademark infringement, so long as the accounts between the parties are not so complicated that only a court of equity could untangle such accounts.
California v. FPC	369 U.S. 482	1962
Commissioner v. Bilder	369 U.S. 499	1962
Carnley v. Cochran	369 U.S. 506	1962
Friedberg v. Silberglitt	369 U.S. 525	1962
Eagle v. Bennett	369 U.S. 525	1962
Simpson v. United States	369 U.S. 526	1962
Vaughan v. Atkinson	369 U.S. 527	1962
Beck v. Washington	369 U.S. 541	1962
Goldblatt v. Hempstead	369 U.S. 590	1962
Hutcheson v. United States	369 U.S. 599	1962
Malone v. Bowdoin	369 U.S. 643	1962
United States v. Diebold, Inc.	369 U.S. 654	1962
Mattox v. Sacks	369 U.S. 656	1962
Best v. City of Toledo	369 U.S. 657	1962
Torrance v. Callenius	369 U.S. 658	1962
Newlon v. Bennett	369 U.S. 658	1962
Hohensee v. News Syndicate, Inc.	369 U.S. 659	1962
Shubin v. S.D. Cal.	369 U.S. 660	1962
Kemp v. United States	369 U.S. 661	1962
Garrett v. United States	369 U.S. 662	1962
Free v. Bland	369 U.S. 663	1962
Hanover Bank v. Commissioner	369 U.S. 672	1962
In re Green	369 U.S. 689	1962
Guzman v. Pichirilo	369 U.S. 698	1962
Lynch v. Overholser	369 U.S. 705	1962
NLRB v. Katz	369 U.S. 736	1962
Russell v. United States	369 U.S. 749	1962
I.L.F.Y. Co. v. Temporary State Housing Rent Comm'n	369 U.S. 795	1962
Certiorari denied and appeal dismissed without further comment. Frankfurter took no part.
Brown v. Cheney	369 U.S. 796	1962
Certiorari denied and appeal dismissed without further comment. Frankfurter took no part.
