= Jackson v. Metropolitan Edison Co. =

- Supreme Court of the United States

Argued October 15, 1974 Decided December 23, 1974
- Full case name: Jackson v. Metropolitan Edison Co.
- Docket no.: 73-5845
- Citations: 419 U.S. 345 (more) 95 S. Ct. 449; 42 L. Ed. 2d 477; 1974 U.S. LEXIS 50; 8 P.U.R.4th 1

Case history
- Prior: Motion to dismiss granted, 348 F. Supp. 954 (M.D. Pa. 1972); affirmed, 483 F.2d 754 (3d Cir. 1973); cert. granted, 415 U.S. 912 (1974).

Holding
- The termination of service to a customer by a regulated public utility does not constitute state action and is thus not subject to judicial review under the Fourteenth Amendment.

Court membership
- Chief Justice Warren E. Burger Associate Justices William O. Douglas · William J. Brennan Jr. Potter Stewart · Byron White; Thurgood Marshall · Harry Blackmun; Lewis F. Powell Jr. · William Rehnquist

Case opinions
- Majority: Rehnquist, joined by Burger, Stewart, White, Blackmun, Powell
- Dissent: Douglas
- Dissent: Brennan
- Dissent: Marshall

Laws applied
- U.S. Const. amend. XIV; 42 U.S.C. § 1983

Jackson v. Metropolitan Edison Co., 419 U.S. 345 (1974), is an administrative law case of the Supreme Court of the United States holding that extensive state regulation of a public utility does not transform its acts into state action that is reviewable by a federal court under the Fourteenth Amendment to the United States Constitution.

== Background ==
The Metropolitan Edison Company, now a unit of FirstEnergy, is an investor-owned private electric company in Pennsylvania that is regulated by the Pennsylvania Public Utility Commission (PUC), and serves retail customers in York. Under a tariff filed with the PUC, the company may discontinue providing electric service to a customer after a reasonable notice for the non-payment of an electric bill.

Catherine Jackson, a resident of York, received electric service under her name to her home, but her service was discontinued in September 1970 because of a delinquency in payments due for service. A new account for electric service was then opened in the name of James Dodson, another resident of the house, and service was resumed. Dodson left the house in August 1971, and the service was continued but no payments were made.

On October 6, 1971, employees of Metropolitan Edison went to Jackson's house and inquired as to Dodson's present address, and Jackson stated that she did not know where he was living. On the next day, another employee discovered that the electricity meter for the house had been tampered with such that it did not register usage. Jackson denied any knowledge about the meter. She then requested that the account for service to the house be shifted to Robert Jackson, who was later determined to be her 12-year-old son. Because contracts made by a minor cannot be enforced under common law, a 12-year-old cannot open an account for utility service. Four days later and without further notice to Jackson, employees of Metropolitan Edison disconnected electric service to the Jackson house.

=== Procedural history ===
Jackson filed suit against Metropolitan Edison in the United States District Court for the Middle District of Pennsylvania alleging a violation of the Civil Rights Act of 1871, 42 U.S.C. § 1983, seeking damages for the termination of electric service and an injunction requiring Metropolitan Edison to continue providing power to her home until she had been provided notice, a hearing, and an opportunity to pay any amounts found due. Her claim was based upon an alleged entitlement to reasonably continuous electric service to her home, and that the electric company's termination of service for alleged nonpayment, an action allowed by a provision of the company's general tariff approved by the PUC, constituted state action that deprived her of property in violation of the Due Process Clause of the Fourteenth Amendment of the United States Constitution.

The district court granted Metropolitan Edison's motion to dismiss the complaint of Jackson on the ground that the termination of service was not state action, and hence was not subject to judicial review under the Fourteenth Amendment. On appeal, the Court of Appeals for the Third Circuit affirmed. The Supreme Court, noting similar decision regarding terminations by other public utility companies, granted certiorari to review the judgment.

== Opinion of the Court ==
The majority opinion by Justice Rehnquist held that the termination of electric service by the public utility did not constitute state action that subjected the termination to judicial review under the Fourteenth Amendment. The opinion compared the regulation of the utility to the factual situation in Burton v. Wilmington Parking Authority, 365 U.S. 715 (1961), and Moose Lodge No. 107 v. Irvis, 407 U.S. 163 (1972). In Burton, state action was found when a state had leased part of a government-owned parking facility to a restaurant that practiced racial segregation because the court found that the state had entangled itself in the business. However, the business in Moose Lodge No. 107 was subject to some state regulation and was privately owned, and the court found that the state regulation did not turn the lodge's acts into state action. In the Jackson case, although tightly regulated, the electric company was privately owned. The court held that the fact that the electric company was at least a partial monopoly in its service territory or that it was subject to extensive state regulation did not turn its termination practices into state action.

Three justices wrote dissenting opinions. Justice Douglas stated that he would have found under the reasoning from Burton that there was state action in the termination of electric service under the lax regulation of the public utility by the state. Justice Brennan in his dissent noted that the electric service had been in the name of a third party, Dobson, rather than the plaintiff Jackson, so there was no live controversy between Jackson and the electric company. Without such a controversy, the Supreme Court would not have a basis for ruling, and should instead have remanded the case with instructions to enter a new judgment of dismissal. Justice Marshall in his dissent indicated that certiorari should not have been granted for this case, and he would have found state action in the termination as the electric company was a monopoly regulated by the state and had used state-approved procedures in the tariff used in the termination.

The Marshall dissent suggests that the majority opinion had, in effect, either overruled or restricted Public Utilities Commission of the District of Columbia v. Pollak, 343 U.S. 451 (1952). Pollak involved a decision of the District of Columbia Public Utilities Commission that allowed a public transit system to play radio programs on its street cars and busses, which the Supreme Court determined did not violate the First or Fifth Amendments. The majority opinion noted that the court in Pollak did not determine whether the playing of the radio programs on the regulated transit system constituted state action as a result of the regulation by the D.C. PUC, but simply assumed state action for the purposes of evaluating the constitutional questions.

== See also ==
- Metropolitan Edison Co. v. People Against Nuclear Energy
- List of United States Supreme Court cases, volume 419
