= Baylis v. Travelers' Insurance Co. =

Baylis v. Travelers' Insurance Company
- Supreme Court of the United States

Argued January 5, 1885 Decided February 2, 1885
- Full case name: Baylis v. Travelers' Insurance Company
- Citations: 113 U.S. 316 (more) 5 S. Ct. 494; 28 L. Ed. 989

Court membership
- Chief Justice Morrison Waite Associate Justices Samuel F. Miller · Stephen J. Field; Joseph P. Bradley · John M. Harlan; William B. Woods · Stanley Matthews; Horace Gray · Samuel Blatchford

Case opinion
- Majority: Matthews, joined by unanimous

Laws applied
- U.S. Const. amend. VII

Baylis v. Travelers' Insurance Company, 113 U.S. 316 (1885), was a case where after close of testimony in a trial, the defendant moved to dismiss on the ground of the insufficiency of the evidence to sustain a verdict. This motion was denied and the plaintiff asked that the case be submitted to the jury to determine the facts on the evidence. The court refused this, and plaintiff excepted. The court then ordered a verdict for plaintiff, subject to its opinion, whether the facts proved were sufficient to render defendant liable to plaintiff on the cause of action stated. Plaintiff moved for judgment on the verdict, and defendant moved for judgment on the pleadings and minutes of trial. Judgment was rendered for defendant upon an opinion of the court as to the effect of the evidence and as to the law on the facts as deduced from it by the court. Held that the plaintiff was thereby deprived of his constitutional right to a trial by jury, which he had not waived, and to which he was entitled.

== Background ==
The case was an action brought by the plaintiff in error to recover upon a policy of insurance issued by the defendant, whereby it insured William Edward Parker Baylis, the father of the plaintiff, in the sum of $10,000, owed the plaintiff in case said assured should accidentally sustain bodily injuries which should produce death within ninety days.

The complaint alleged that the assured "on or about the 20th day of November 1872, did sustain bodily injuries accidentally, to-wit, in that wholly by accident he took certain drugs and medicines, which, as taken by him, were poisonous and deadly, when, in fact he intended to take wholly a different thing and in a different manner, and that, in consequence of said accident solely, said assured died on said 20th day of November 1872."

An issue was made by a denial in the answer of this allegation, so far as it alleged that the poisonous and deadly drugs were taken "accidentally, or by accident, or with the intent, or under the circumstances stated or mentioned in the complaint" to commit suicide.

== Opinion ==
Justice Matthews delivered the opinion of the Court. He recited the facts and then continued:

If, after the plaintiff's case had been closed, the court had directed a verdict for the defendant on the ground that the evidence, with all inferences that the jury could justifiably draw from it, was insufficient to support a verdict for the plaintiff, so that such a verdict, if returned, must be set aside, it would have followed a practice sanctioned by repeated decisions of this Court. Randall v. Baltimore & Ohio Railroad, 109 U. S. 478, and cases there cited. And, in that event, the plaintiff, having duly excepted to the ruling in a bill of exceptions, setting out all the evidence, upon a writ of error, would have been entitled to the judgment of this Court, whether, as a matter of law, the ruling against him was erroneous.

Or if, in the present case, a verdict having been taken for the plaintiff by direction of the court, subject to its opinion whether the evidence was sufficient to sustain it, the court had subsequently granted a motion on behalf of the defendant for a new trial, and set aside the verdict on the ground of the insufficiency of the evidence, it would have followed a common practice, in respect to which error could not have been alleged, or it might, with propriety, have reserved the question, what judgment should be rendered, and in favor of what party, upon an agreed statement of facts, and afterwards rendered judgment upon its conclusions of law. But without a waiver of the right of trial by jury, by consent of parties, the court errs if it substitutes itself for the jury, and, passing upon the effect of the evidence, finds the facts involved in the issue, and renders judgment thereon.

This is what was done in the present case. It may be that the conclusions of fact reached and stated by the court are correct, and, when properly ascertained, that they require such a judgment as was rendered. That is a question not before us. The plaintiff in error complains that he was entitled to have the evidence submitted to the jury, and to the benefit of such conclusions of fact as it might justifiably have drawn—a right he demanded and did not waive, and that he has been deprived of it, by the act of the court, in entering a judgment against him on its own view of the evidence, without the intervention of a jury.

In this particular, the court thought error was well assigned. The right of trial by jury in the courts of the United States is expressly secured by the Seventh Amendment to the United States Constitution, and Congress has, by statute, provided for the trial of issues of fact in civil cases by the court without the intervention of a jury, only when the parties waive their right to a jury by a stipulation in writing. Rev.Stat. §§ 648, 649.

This constitutional right this Court has always guarded with jealousy. Elmore v. Grymes, 1 Pet. 469; DeWolf v. Rabaud, 1 Pet. 476; Castle v. Bullard, 23 How. 172; Hodges v. Easton, 106 U.S. 408.

For error in this particular, the judgment was reversed and the cause remanded with directions to grant a new trial.

== See also ==
- Travelers Casualty & Surety Co. of America v. Pacific Gas & Elec. Co. (2007)
