= Gulf South Pipeline =

Gulf South Pipeline Company, LP
- Company type: Limited partnership
- Founded: 1930 (as United Gas Pipeline Company)
- Headquarters: Houston, TX, U.S.A.
- Products: Gas Pipeline
- Parent: Boardwalk Pipeline Partners, LP
- Website: www.gulfsouthpl.com

Gulf South Pipeline is a natural gas pipeline system that transports gas between south and east Texas, Louisiana, Alabama, Mississippi, and Florida. The system is owned by a limited partnership. The system connects to Henry Hub in Louisiana. Its FERC code is 11. The pipeline was formerly owned by the United Gas Pipe Line Company, a subsidiary of United Gas Corporation.

Over the years, United Gas Pipe Line was acquired by a number of companies: Pennzoil (1965), MidCon Corporation (1986), LaSalle Energy Corporation (1987) and Koch Industries (1992). In August 1993, the pipeline was renamed Koch Gateway Pipeline, and in 2001, Koch contributed Koch Gateway Pipeline to a joint venture with Entergy Corporation, re-christening the pipeline as Gulf South Pipeline Company. On December 29, 2004, Loews Corporation purchased Gulf South Pipeline.

The company was willing to assert its rights in court, and was a party in several Supreme Court cases:

- United Gas Pipe Line Co. v. Mobile Gas Service Corp., 350 U.S. 332 (1956)
- United Gas Pipe Line Co. v. Memphis Light, Gas, and Water Division, 358 U.S. 103 (1958)
- United Gas Pipe Line Co. v. Ideal Cement Co., 369 U.S. 134 (1962)
- United Gas Pipe Line Co. v. Federal Power Commission, 385 U.S. 83 (1966)
- Federal Power Commission v. United Gas Pipe Line Co., 386 U.S. 237 (1967)
- Federal Power Commission v. United Gas Pipe Line Co., 393 U.S. 71 (1968)
- United Gas Pipe Line Co. v. Mccombs, 442 U.S. 529 (1979)

The company was also involved in several appeals to the Supreme Court which were not granted certiorari.

== See also ==
- List of North American natural gas pipelines
