= United Gas Pipe Line Co. v. Memphis Light, Gas, & Water Division =

United Gas Pipe Line Co. v. Memphis Light, Gas, and Water Division
- Supreme Court of the United States

Argued October 20–21, 1958 Decided December 8, 1958
- Full case name: United Gas Pipe Line Co. v. Memphis Light, Gas, and Water Division, et al.
- Citations: 358 U.S. 103 (more) 79 S. Ct. 194; 3 L. Ed. 2d 153; 1958 U.S. LEXIS 1773

Case history
- Prior: 250 F.2d 402, 102 U.S. App. D.C. 77 (D.C. Cir. 1954); cert. granted, 355 U.S. 938 (1958).
- Subsequent: Rehearing denied, 358 U.S. 942 (1959)

Holding
- A gas company could may unilaterally modify a rate in a contract by filing a new rate schedule if the contract specifies that the rate is that on the rate schedule on file with the Federal Power Commission

Court membership
- Chief Justice Earl Warren Associate Justices Hugo Black · Felix Frankfurter; William O. Douglas · Tom C. Clark; John M. Harlan II · William J. Brennan Jr. Charles E. Whittaker · Potter Stewart

Case opinions
- Majority: Harlan, joined by Frankfurter, Burton, Brennan, Whittaker
- Dissent: Douglas, joined by Warren, Black
- Clark took no part in the consideration or decision of the case.

Laws applied
- National Gas Act, 15 U.S.C. § 717 et seq.

United Gas Pipe Line Co. v. Memphis Light, Gas, and Water Division, 358 U.S. 103 (1958), is a United States Supreme Court case in which the Court interpreted the Natural Gas Act of 1938 (NGA) as allowing a gas supply company to unilaterally modify a rate in a natural gas supply contract if the contract specified that the rate was that of the rate schedule filed with the Federal Power Commission (FPC) and the gas company filed a new rate schedule. This case clarified the Mobile-Sierra doctrine established by United Gas Pipe Line Co. v. Mobile Gas Service Corp. (1956) and its companion case Federal Power Commission v. Sierra Pacific Power Co. (1956), which holds that an electricity or natural gas supply rate established resulting from a freely negotiated contract is presumed to be "just and reasonable" and thus acceptable under the NGA or Federal Power Act (FPA).

== Background ==
The NGA was enacted in 1938 to regulate the interstate natural gas industry, including gas pipeline companies. The NGA regulated the rates charged by gas companies to their customers, which included local gas distribution companies and industrial users, through the filing by gas companies of rate schedules and contracts with customers. The NGA required gas companies to file tariffs of their new rates with the FPC, a federal administrative agency, at least thirty days prior to their becoming effective, and authorized the FPC to investigate rates to determine if they were in the public interest. The FPC could also suspend rates except for those involving gas supplied to industrial users while the investigating the rates.

The United Gas Pipe Line Co., a natural gas pipeline company that operated in several states and was subject to regulation under the NGA, provided gas under long-term contracts to distribution companies such as the Texas Gas Transportation Corp., Southern Natural Gas Co., and the Mississippi Valley Gas Co. The Memphis Light, Gas, and Water Division (MLGW), a distribution system in Memphis, Tennessee, purchased gas from Texas Gas under a contract in which MLGW was required to reimburse Texas Gas for any increases in the cost of gas provided by United Gas. Each of these contracts had a clause which specified that the rate for the gas was that on the United Gas rate schedule on file with the FPC or any effective rate schedule. On September 30, 1955, United Gas filed a new rate schedule with the FPC which proposed to increase the contract rates. The FPC suspended the rates as provided in the NGA and initiated an administrative proceeding to determine the lawfulness of the new rate schedule. The distribution companies and MLG&W intervened in the proceeding. After the Supreme Court issued its Mobile Gas decision which held that the unilateral filing of a new rate schedule could not abrogate a gas contract with a specified rate on February 27, 1956, the distribution companies and MLGW moved to dismiss the new rate schedule. The FPC upheld the new rate schedule on the basis that the distribution companies had contracted to essentially pay the "going" rate on the effective United Gas rate schedule, and distinguished Mobile Gas as applying to gas contracts with a fixed rate.

The distribution companies and MLGW appealed the decision to the Court of Appeals for the District of Columbia, which then reversed the FPC in an opinion which held that Mobile Gas had established that the FPC could review the new rate schedule only if the customers of a gas company consented to the filing of the schedule. The Supreme Court granted certiorari based on a claim that the Court of Appeals misunderstood the Memphis Gas decision.

== Opinion ==
In a majority opinion by Justice Harlan, the Supreme Court reversed the Court of Appeals, stating that it "misconceived" the Mobile Gas decision. Mobile Gas involved contracts to supply gas at a specific price, and the NGA did not permit a gas pipeline company to abrogate the contract by filing a new rate schedule. In Memphis, United Gas and the distribution companies had agreed in the contract that the price would be the current "going" rate, which left United Gas able to revise the rate by filing a new rate schedule with the FPC subject only to review for lawfulness under the NGA. The Court explained that in allowing gas companies and customers to determine gas rates through contracts in the NGA, Congress was indicating that the public interest not only required protection of customers from excessive gas costs, but also recognized the legitimate interest of natural gas companies. The opinion stated that natural gas companies, in order to protect their ability to access financial markets, must be able to raise rates in order to fund the maintenance of gas systems and its expansion through debt and securities. This was a proper concern of Congress in enacting the NGA as noted in Federal Power Commission v. Hope Natural Gas Co. (1944). Lastly, the opinion noted that "going" rate contracts were common, and the ability of gas companies to revise the "going" rate by filing new rate schedules had not previously been considered to be an issue.

Justice Douglas in his dissenting opinion stated that it had been his understanding that Mobile Gas required that rates in gas contracts could only be revised under the NGA with the agreement of the parties, which would include the customers.

In Memphis, the oral argument before the Supreme Court on behalf of the FPC was made by U.S. Solicitor General J. Lee Rankin.

== Subsequent events ==
A motion for rehearing of the decision was denied by the Supreme Court in 1959.

Although the dissenting opinion in Memphis suggested that the decision would "make a shambles" of the administration of the NGA as far as customer interests were concerned, the Supreme Court did not find it necessary to rule on issues involving the Mobile-Sierra doctrine for another fifty years. In Morgan Stanley Capital Group v. Public Utility District No. 1 of Snohomish County, Washington (2008), the Court held that the restrictions against the modification of contracts also applied to customers with unfavorable rates. One reference describes the Mobile Gas, Sierra Power, and Memphis cases as the first chapter of the Mobile-Sierra doctrine, with Morgan Stanley as the second chapter and NRG Power Marketing, LLC v. Maine Public Utilities Commission (2010) as the third.

On October 1, 1977, the FPC was replaced by the Federal Energy Regulatory Commission.

== See also ==
- List of United States Supreme Court cases, volume 358
