= Allied Stores of Ohio, Inc. v. Bowers =

- Supreme Court of the United States

Decided February 24, 1959
- Full case name: Allied Stores of Ohio, Inc. v. Bowers
- Citations: 358 U.S. 522 (more)

Holding
- Exempting non-residents from a state tax on storing property in warehouses was constitutional.

Court membership
- Chief Justice Earl Warren Associate Justices Hugo Black · Felix Frankfurter; William O. Douglas · Tom C. Clark; John M. Harlan II · William J. Brennan Jr. Charles E. Whittaker · Potter Stewart

Case opinions
- Majority: Whittaker
- Concurrence: Brennan, joined by Harlan

Allied Stores of Ohio, Inc. v. Bowers, 358 U.S. 522 (1959), was a United States Supreme Court case in which the Court held that exempting non-residents from a state tax on storing property in warehouses was constitutional. According to the Court, the state was allowed to attract out-of-state business, and the exemption was a rational means for that end.
