= Goldlawr, Inc. v. Heiman =

- Supreme Court of the United States

Decided April 30, 1962
- Full case name: Goldlawr, Inc. v. Heiman
- Citations: 369 U.S. 463 (more)

Holding
- A transfer to a venue with personal jurisdiction is proper even if the court the case transferred from did not have personal jurisdiction.

Court membership
- Chief Justice Earl Warren Associate Justices Hugo Black · Felix Frankfurter; William O. Douglas · Tom C. Clark; John M. Harlan II · William J. Brennan Jr. Potter Stewart · Byron White

Case opinions
- Majority: Black
- Dissent: Harlan, joined by Stewart
- Frankfurter, White took no part in the consideration or decision of the case.

Goldlawr, Inc. v. Heiman, 369 U.S. 463 (1962), was a United States Supreme Court case in which the court held that a transfer to a venue with personal jurisdiction is proper even if the court the case transferred from did not have personal jurisdiction. The court that receives such a transfer must have personal jurisdiction over the defendant per Hoffman v. Blaski.

== Background ==
Goldlawr brought a private antitrust action for treble damages and other relief under §§ 1 and 2 of the Sherman Act and § 4 of the Clayton Act in a federal District Court in Pennsylvania. On a motion to dismiss on grounds of improper venue and want of personal jurisdiction over the defendants, that court found that venue was improperly laid as to two of the corporate defendants because they were not inhabitants of, "found" or transacting business in Pennsylvania.

However, instead of dismissing the action, it transferred the case using its authority under 28 U.S.C. § 1406(a), a statute for transferring a case from an improper venue to a proper one. The case moved to the Southern District of New York, where venue was proper because the defendants could be found and transacted business there and personal jurisdiction over them could be obtained by service of process under § 12. These two corporate defendants then moved the federal District Court in New York to dismiss the action on the ground that the District Court in Pennsylvania did not have personal jurisdiction over them and, therefore, lacked power under § 1406(a) to transfer the action.

== Opinion of the court ==
The Supreme Court issued an opinion on April 30, 1962.

In dissent, Justice Harlan said, "The notion that a District Court may deal with an in personam action in such a way as possibly to affect a defendant's substantive rights without first acquiring jurisdiction over him is not a familiar one in federal jurisprudence."
