= Teamsters v. Lucas Flour Co. =

- Supreme Court of the United States

Decided March 5, 1962
- Full case name: Local 174, Teamsters, Chauffeurs, Warehousemen & Helpers of America v. Lucas Flour Co.
- Citations: 369 U.S. 95 (more)

Holding
- A binding arbitration stipulation in a collective bargaining agreement constitutes a limited, implied no-strike clause over the matters subject to arbitration.

Court membership
- Chief Justice Earl Warren Associate Justices Hugo Black · Felix Frankfurter; William O. Douglas · Tom C. Clark; John M. Harlan II · William J. Brennan Jr. Charles E. Whittaker · Potter Stewart

Case opinions
- Majority: Stewart
- Dissent: Black

Teamsters v. Lucas Flour Co., 369 U.S. 95 (1962), was a United States Supreme Court case in which the court held that a binding arbitration stipulation in a collective bargaining agreement constitutes a limited, implied no-strike clause over the matters subject to arbitration. Therefore, a strike to settle a dispute subject to mandatory arbitration was unprotected.

== Significance ==
Technically, this case was limited to an award of monetary damages to the employer for an unprotected strike. A later case, Gateway Coal Co. v. Mine Workers, extended this principle to injunctive relief.
