= List of United States Supreme Court cases, volume 358 =

This is a list of all the United States Supreme Court cases from volume 358 of the United States Reports, which included cases from 1958 and 1959:

Case name	Citation	Date decided
Cooper v. Aaron	358 U.S. 1	1958
Moore v. Terminal R.R. Ass'n	358 U.S. 31	1958
Oakridge Cemetery Ass'n v. Oakridge Cemetery Corp.	358 U.S. 36	1958
Permian Basin Pipeline Co. v. Railroad Comm'n	358 U.S. 37	1958
United States v. National Malleable & Steel Castings Co.	358 U.S. 38	1958
Steinbeck v. Gerosa	358 U.S. 39	1958
NAACP v. Committee on Offenses Against Admin. of Justice	358 U.S. 40	1958
Schon v. Schon	358 U.S. 41	1958
Kitchens v. United States	358 U.S. 42	1958
Geo. F. Alger Co. v. Bowers	358 U.S. 43	1958
Westlake Hosp. Ass'n v. Blix	358 U.S. 43	1958
Linder v. Collins	358 U.S. 44	1958
Pennsylvania R.R. Co. v. Sayreville	358 U.S. 44	1958
Shippers' Car Supply Comm'n v. ICC	358 U.S. 45	1958
Dye v. Ohio	358 U.S. 45	1958
U.S. Steel Corp. v. Washington	358 U.S. 46	1958
Walters v. Connecticut	358 U.S. 46	1958
Grochowiak v. Pennsylvania	358 U.S. 47	1958
Maranze v. Montgomery Cnty. Bd. of Elections	358 U.S. 47	1958
Granieri v. California	358 U.S. 48	1958
United States ex rel. Farnsworth v. Murphy	358 U.S. 48	1958
Sangamon Valley Television Corp. v. United States	358 U.S. 49	1958
Wirl Television Corp. v. United States	358 U.S. 51	1958
Kovrak v. Ginsburg	358 U.S. 52	1958
Boston Five Cents Sav. Bank v. New Bedford	358 U.S. 53	1958
Graham-White Sales Corp. v. Prime Mfg. Co.	358 U.S. 53	1958
New Orleans City Park Improvement Ass'n v. Detiege	358 U.S. 54	1958
Mounts v. West Virginia	358 U.S. 54	1958
Worz, Inc. v. FCC	358 U.S. 55	1958
Fellom v. Redevelopment Agency	358 U.S. 56	1958
Deen v. Hickman	358 U.S. 57	1958
Fonk v. Yorkville	358 U.S. 58	1958
Peurifoy v. Commissioner	358 U.S. 59	1958
California v. Washington	358 U.S. 64	1958
Hinkle v. New England Mut. Ins. Co.	358 U.S. 65	1958
United States v. Hulley	358 U.S. 66	1958
Gulfport Farm & Pasture Co. v. Hancock Bank	358 U.S. 67	1958
Latham v. Eckle	358 U.S. 67	1958
Boston & M.R.R. Co. v. United States	358 U.S. 68	1958
Coulter v. Anthony	358 U.S. 73	1958
Hawkins v. United States	358 U.S. 74	1958
FHA v. Darlington, Inc.	358 U.S. 84	1958
Hotel Employees v. Leedom	358 U.S. 99	1958
Eagle Lion Studios, Inc. v. Loew's Inc.	358 U.S. 100	1958
Shuttlesworth v. Birmingham Bd. of Educ.	358 U.S. 101	1958
Givens v. West Virginia	358 U.S. 102	1958
United Gas Pipe Line Co. v. Memphis Light, Gas, and Water Division	358 U.S. 103	1958
United States v. A. & P. Trucking Co.	358 U.S. 121	1958
Universal Trades, Inc. v. Pennsylvania	358 U.S. 129	1958
Ciletti v. Washington	358 U.S. 130	1958
Sanders v. Texas	358 U.S. 130	1958
Ullner v. Ohio	358 U.S. 131	1958
van Newkirk v. McNeill	358 U.S. 131	1958
Kidd v. Ohio	358 U.S. 132	1958
Loeber v. California	358 U.S. 132	1958
American Trucking Ass'ns, Inc. v. Frisco Transp. Co.	358 U.S. 133	1958
Flaxer v. United States	358 U.S. 147	1958
Flemming v. Florida Citrus Exch.	358 U.S. 153	1958
Ladner v. United States	358 U.S. 169	1958
Leedom v. Kyne	358 U.S. 184	1958
Evers v. Dwyer	358 U.S. 202	1958
Briggs v. City of Los Angeles	358 U.S. 205	1958
James v. Todd	358 U.S. 206	1958
Mitchell v. Lublin, McGaughy & Associates	358 U.S. 207	1959
Williams v. Lee	358 U.S. 217	1959
Alaska v. American Can Co.	358 U.S. 224	1959
Lee v. Madigan	358 U.S. 228	1959
International Boxing Club v. United States	358 U.S. 242	1959
Hotel Employees v. Sax Enterprises, Inc.	358 U.S. 270	1959
Hahn v. Ross Island Sand & Gravel Co.	358 U.S. 272	1959
United States ex rel. Jennings v. Ragen	358 U.S. 276	1959
Somerville Milling Co. v. Worcester N. Sav. Inst.	358 U.S. 278	1959
Territo v. United States	358 U.S. 279	1959
FPC v. Midwestern Gas Transmission Co.	358 U.S. 280	1959
Smith v. United States (1959)	358 U.S. 281	1959
F. & M. Schaefer Brewing Co. v. Gerosa	358 U.S. 282	1959
McDaniel v. California	358 U.S. 282	1959
Teamsters v. Oliver	358 U.S. 283	1959
Second Fed. Sav. & Loan Ass'n v. Bowers	358 U.S. 305	1959
Cudd v. Mathers	358 U.S. 306	1959
Lancaster Security Inv. Corp. v. Kessler	358 U.S. 306	1959
Draper v. United States	358 U.S. 307	1959
Greene v. United States	358 U.S. 326	1959
Rogers v. Calumet Nat'l Bank	358 U.S. 331	1959
Herrmann v. Rogers	358 U.S. 332	1959
Bass v. United States	358 U.S. 333	1959
Lanza v. New Jersey	358 U.S. 333	1959
United States v. RCA	358 U.S. 334	1959
Romero v. International Terminal Operating Co.	358 U.S. 354	1959
Heflin v. United States	358 U.S. 415	1959
Crumady v. The Joachim Hendrik Fisser	358 U.S. 423	1959
Railway Express Agency, Inc. v. Virginia	358 U.S. 434	1959
Northwestern States Portland Cement Co. v. Minnesota	358 U.S. 450	1959
Cammarano v. United States	358 U.S. 498	1959
Kelly v. Kosuga	358 U.S. 516	1958
Allied Stores of Ohio, Inc. v. Bowers	358 U.S. 522	1959
Youngstown Sheet & Tube Co. v. Bowers	358 U.S. 534	1959
Williams v. Oklahoma	358 U.S. 576	1959
The Tungus	358 U.S. 588	1959
Sandy Hook Pilots' Ass'n v. Halecki	358 U.S. 613	1959
Kermarec v. Compagnie Generale Transatlantique	358 U.S. 625	1959
Cash v. Culver	358 U.S. 633	1959
Meridian v. Southern Bell Tel. & Tel. Co.	358 U.S. 639	1959
Chaffin v. California	358 U.S. 642	1959
Anderson v. Corporation Comm'n	358 U.S. 642	1959
Hanauer v. Elkins	358 U.S. 643	1959
Webb v. Ohio	358 U.S. 643	1959
United States v. Haley	358 U.S. 644	1959
Landman v. Miedzinski	358 U.S. 644	1959
Klein v. Lee	358 U.S. 645	1959
Chapman v. Ohio	358 U.S. 645	1959
Riser v. Warden	358 U.S. 646	1959
Johnson v. Ohio	358 U.S. 647	1959
