= Pacific Gas & Electric Co. v. Public Utilities Commission =

Pacific Gas & Electric v. Public Utilities Commission
- Supreme Court of the United States

Argued October 8, 1985 Decided February 25, 1986
- Full case name: Pacific Gas & Electric Co. v. Public Utilities Commission of California et al.
- Citations: 475 U.S. 1 (more) 106 S. Ct. 903; 89 L. Ed. 2d 1; 1986 U.S. LEXIS 1

Holding
- A private publisher cannot be forced to carry messages inconsistent with its views.

Court membership
- Chief Justice Warren E. Burger Associate Justices William J. Brennan Jr. · Byron White; Thurgood Marshall · Harry Blackmun; Lewis F. Powell Jr. · William Rehnquist; John P. Stevens · Sandra Day O'Connor

Case opinions
- Plurality: Powell, joined by Burger, Brennan, O'Connor
- Concurrence: Burger
- Concurrence: Marshall (in judgment)
- Dissent: Rehnquist, joined by White, Stevens (part I only)
- Dissent: Stevens
- Blackmun took no part in the consideration or decision of the case.

Laws applied
- U.S. Const. amend. I

Pacific Gas & Electric v. Public Utilities Commission, 475 U.S. 1 (1986), was a United States Supreme Court case involving a dispute over newsletters that the San Francisco–based privately owned public utility Pacific Gas and Electric Company (PG&E) had included with its monthly bills to customers. The special interest group Toward Utility Rate Normalization (TURN) sued PG&E, arguing that the extra space in the billing envelope taken by the newsletters constituted a form of political speech whose cost the public should not have to bear.

The California Public Utilities Commission mediated the dispute and initially determined that, since the space in the envelope ostensibly belonged to the general public, PG&E could be compelled to carry a message supplied by TURN in rebuttal to the messages supplied in the newsletter. The rationale used by the regulatory agency was that the space in the billing envelope which could have material added that did not increase postage belonged to the ratepayers rather than the utility; thus the commission could order the utility to allow other groups to use that space subject to restrictions.

PG&E responded to the decision by suing California's Public Utilities Commission, invoking a First Amendment right against compelled speech. Among other arguments, PG&E contended that it should not be compelled to carry messages it disagrees with, that the inclusion only of critical viewpoints was discriminatory, and that it was being compelled to formulate and include a rebuttal to TURN's comments with each mailing.

The U.S. Supreme Court found the order of the California Public Utilities Commission to be unconstitutional, as the right to speak includes the right not to carry messages one disagrees with. As the court stated, "the choice to speak includes within it the choice of what not to say." The case became an important precedent for cases involving the free speech rights of private corporations. It also critically granted, with very limited exceptions, the absolute right of a publisher to choose not to carry messages it does not agree with.

== See also ==
- Pacific Gas & Electric Co. v. State Energy Resources Conservation and Development Commission (1983)
- Travelers Casualty & Surety Co. of America v. Pacific Gas & Elec. Co. (2007)
- List of United States Supreme Court cases, volume 475
