= Cooper v. Aaron =

1958 U.S. Supreme Court case

- Supreme Court of the United States

Argued September 11, 1958 Decided September 12, 1958
- Full case name: William G. Cooper, et al., Members of the Board of Directors of the Little Rock, Arkansas, Independent School District, and Virgial T. Blossom, Superintendent of Schools v. John Aaron, et al.
- Citations: 358 U.S. 1 (more) 78 S. Ct. 1401; 3 L. Ed. 2d 5; 1958 U.S. LEXIS 657; 79 Ohio L. Abs. 452

Case history
- Prior: Suspension of order granted, 163 F. Supp. 13 (E.D. Ark 1958); reversed, 257 F.2d 33 (8th Cir. 1958); cert. granted, 358 U.S. 29 (1958).
- Subsequent: Opinion announced September 29, 1958

Holding
- This Court cannot countenance a claim by the Governor and Legislature of a State that there is no duty on state officials to obey federal court orders resting on this Court's considered interpretation of the United States Constitution in Brown v. Board of Education (1954).

Court membership
- Chief Justice Earl Warren Associate Justices Hugo Black · Felix Frankfurter; William O. Douglas · Harold H. Burton; Tom C. Clark · John M. Harlan II; William J. Brennan Jr. · Charles E. Whittaker

Case opinions
- Majority: Warren, Black, Frankfurter, Douglas, Burton, Clark, Harlan, Brennan, Whittaker
- Concurrence: Frankfurter

Laws applied
- U.S. Const. amend. XIV; Supremacy Clause

Cooper v. Aaron, 358 U.S. 1 (1958), is a landmark decision of the Supreme Court of the United States that denied the school board of Little Rock, Arkansas the right to delay racial desegregation for 30 months. On September 12, 1958, the Warren Court delivered a decision that held that the states are bound by the Court's decisions and must enforce them even if the states disagree with them, asserting the judicial supremacy established in Marbury v. Madison (1803). The decision in this case upheld the rulings in Brown v. Board of Education and Brown II which held that the doctrine of separate but equal was unconstitutional.

== Background ==
In the wake of Brown v. Board of Education (1954), the school district of Little Rock, Arkansas formulated a plan to desegregate its schools. Meanwhile, other school districts in the state opposed the Supreme Court's rulings and did not make any attempts to desegregate their schools. The Arkansas state legislature amended the state constitution in 1956 to oppose desegregation and then passed a law relieving children from mandatory attendance at integrated schools.

Caught between the Arkansas voters and the federal government, Governor Orval Faubus agreed to file a lawsuit in state court to enjoin the school board's integration plan.

On September 3, 1957, the school board filed suit in the United States District Court for the Eastern District of Arkansas, seeking to delay their plan, but the district court ordered them to proceed. In response, Faubus ordered the National Guard to physically block the Little Rock Nine from entering the school. On September 20, the federal district court enjoined Faubus from obstructing desegregation orders. Faubus withdrew the National Guard, and according to some accounts, encouraged the mob violence that followed.

State government officials continued to fan the flames. The actions of the Arkansas governor, especially deploying the National Guard to obstruct desegregation, and rumors that he encouraged vigilantism, most likely escalated the state's conflict with President Eisenhower. Eisenhower demanded that the mob disperse immediately, and deployed federal troops when that order was ignored.

On February 20, 1958, the school board filed a petition in the district court seeking to delay desegregation because of the danger and disruption to education that would be caused by the public's hostility to the desegregation plan. The district court granted the school board's request, finding there was "chaos, bedlam and turmoil" at the school, threats of violence against black students, unrest that had an adverse impact on the school's educational purpose, and that the school board could not be expected to carry out the desegregation plan without "military assistance or its equivalent". The United States Court of Appeals for the Eighth Circuit heard the appeal after the NAACP, represented by Thurgood Marshall, appealed. Once the court of appeals handed down its decision in favor of the defendants, the school board appealed to the Supreme Court, which met in a rare summer session to hear arguments.

== Supreme Court ==
=== Oral arguments ===
During oral arguments, Justices Harlan and Frankfurter noted that the record supported a conclusion that official state actions had instigated much of the local unrest. The attorney for the school board said it was "a head-on collision between the Federal and State Governments" that was beyond the school board's control. The Supreme Court was not inclined to tolerate the state government's challenge of its authority. The NAACP emphasized the stack of defiant legislative measures awaiting the governor's signature in Arkansas as evidence of officially-sanctioned lawlessness in the state. The President supported this view as well, and his administration argued as amicus for a decision based on the Supremacy Clause.

=== Decision ===
On September 12, 1958, the Supreme Court issued an opinion jointly authored by all nine Justices—the only instance of that occurring on record—but primarily drafted by Justice Brennan. The Court noted that the school board had acted in good faith, asserting that most of the problems stemmed from the official opposition of the Arkansas state government to racial integration. Nonetheless, it was constitutionally impermissible to maintain law and order by depriving the black students of their equal rights under the law.

More importantly, the Court held that the Supremacy Clause of Article VI made the US Constitution the supreme law of the land and Marbury v. Madison (1803) made the Supreme Court the final interpreter of the Constitution. This point was targeted by critics of the decision, most famously Alexander Bickel, who wrote in The Least Dangerous Branch that Supreme Court decisions only bind the parties before the Court.

The Court rejected the contention that the Arkansas legislature and Governor were not bound by the Brown decision. The Supreme Court also rejected the doctrines of nullification and interposition in this case, which had been invoked by segregationists. Segregation supporters argued that the states have the power to nullify federal laws or court rulings that they believe to be unconstitutional and the states could use this power to nullify the Brown decision. The Arkansas laws that attempted to prevent desegregation were Arkansas' effort to nullify the Brown decision. The Supreme Court held that the Brown decision "can neither be nullified openly and directly by state legislators or state executive or judicial officers nor nullified indirectly by them through evasive schemes for segregation." Thus, Cooper v. Aaron held that state attempts to nullify federal law are ineffective.

Moreover, since public officials are required to swear an oath to uphold the Constitution (as per Article VI, Clause 3), the officials who ignored the supremacy of the Court's precedent in the Brown case violated their oaths. Cooper also maintained that even though education is the responsibility of the state government, that responsibility must be carried out in a manner consistent with the requirements of the Constitution, particularly the Fourteenth Amendment.

Justice Frankfurter wrote separately to say that "[v]iolent resistance to the law" could not be endorsed by the law "to enthrone official lawlessness".

== Critical response ==
Despite all nine Justices signing the opinion, Justice Frankfurter published a separate concurring opinion. He was, however, dissuaded from announcing it the same day as the main opinion by Justices Brennan and Black, who felt a unanimous decision would emphasize how strongly the Court felt about the issue. Frankfurter's opinion did not directly contradict the majority opinion, but it did reemphasize the importance of judicial supremacy and expressed disdain for the Arkansas State Legislature's actions.

Some legal scholars criticized the Court's rationale in Cooper. Perhaps the most famous criticism of the case was that of former US Attorney General Edwin Meese, in a law review article entitled The Law of the Constitution. There, Meese accused the Court of taking too much power for itself by setting itself up as the sole institution responsible for the interpretation of the Constitution. He wrote that while judicial interpretation of the Constitution binds the parties of the case, it should not establish a supreme law of the land that must be accepted by all persons.

Alexander Bickel said rhetoric invoking the Supremacy Clause was illusory: "[T]he decisive issue. . . going beyond the fictions of Marbury v. Madison, was the correctness of the Court's desegregation opinion."

== Significance ==
Cooper v. Aaron articulated the principle that the Supreme Court's decisions are final, overriding all state and public officials.

== See also ==
- List of United States Supreme Court cases, volume 358

== Sources ==
- Farber, Daniel A.; Eskridge, William N. Jr.; Frickey, Philip P. (2003). Constitutional Law: Themes for the Constitution's Third Century. Thomson-West. ISBN 0-314-14353-X.
- Hall, Kermit L., ed. (2005). The Oxford Companion to the Supreme Court of the United States (2nd ed.). Oxford University Press. ISBN 978-0-19-517661-2.
- Freyer, Tony A. (2007). Little Rock on Trial: Cooper v. Aaron and School Desegregation. Lawrence, Kansas: University Press of Kansas.
