= 2000–2001 California electricity crisis =

Electricity crisis in California in 2000–2001

- Chronology
1996	California begins to modify controls on its energy market and takes measures ostensibly to increase competition.
September 23, 1996	Pete Wilson signs Electric Utility Industry Restructuring Act (Assembly Bill 1890) and it becomes law.
April 1998	Spot market for energy begins operation.
May 2000	Significant rise in energy prices.
June 14, 2000	Blackouts affect 97,000 customers in San Francisco Bay area during a heat wave.
August 2000	San Diego Gas & Electric Company files a complaint alleging manipulation of the markets.
January 17–18, 2001	Blackouts affect several hundred thousand customers.
January 17, 2001	Governor Davis declares a state of emergency.
March 19–20, 2001	Blackouts affect 1.5 million customers.
April 2001	Pacific Gas & Electric Co. files for bankruptcy.
May 7–8, 2001	Blackouts affect upwards of 167,000 customers.
September 2001	Energy prices normalize.
December 2001	Following the bankruptcy of Enron, it is alleged that energy prices were manipulated by Enron.
February 2002	Federal Energy Regulatory Commission begins investigation of Enron's involvement.
Winter 2002	The Enron Tapes scandal begins to surface.
November 13, 2003	Governor Davis ends the state of emergency.

The 2000–2001 California electricity crisis, also known as the Western U.S. energy crisis of 2000 and 2001, was a period during which the state of California experienced an electricity shortage caused by market manipulation and capped retail electricity prices. The state suffered multiple large-scale blackouts, one of its largest energy companies collapsed, and the economic fall-out greatly harmed the standing of Governor Gray Davis.

Drought and delays in the approval of new power plants also decreased supply. This caused an 800% increase in wholesale electricity prices from April 2000 to December 2000. In addition, rolling blackouts adversely affected many businesses dependent on a reliable supply of electricity and inconvenienced many retail consumers.

California had an installed generating capacity of 45 GW (gigawatts, or billions of watts). At the time of the blackouts, demand was 28 GW. A supply-demand gap was created by energy companies, mainly Enron, to create artificial shortages. Energy traders took power plants offline for maintenance during days of peak demand to increase prices. Traders were thus able to sell power at premium prices, sometimes at up to twenty times its normal value. Because the state government capped retail electricity charges, this market manipulation squeezed the industry's revenue margins, causing the bankruptcy of Pacific Gas and Electric Company (PG&E) and the near bankruptcy of Southern California Edison in early 2001.

According to the Federal Energy Regulatory Commission (FERC), the situation became possible because of legislation enacted in 1996 by the California Legislature (AB 1890) and Governor Pete Wilson that deregulated some aspects of the energy industry. Enron took advantage of this partial deregulation and engaged in economic withholding and inflated price bidding in California's spot markets.

The damage caused by the crisis was estimated to be between $40 and $45 billion.

== Causes ==
=== Market manipulation ===
As the FERC report concluded, market manipulation was only possible because of the complex market design produced by partial deregulation. Manipulation strategies were known to energy traders by names such as "Fat Boy", "Death Star", "Forney Perpetual Loop", "Wheel Out", "Ricochet", "Ping Pong", "Black Widow", "Big Foot", "Red Congo", "Cong Catcher", and "Get Shorty".

In a letter sent by David Fabian to Senator Boxer in 2002, it was alleged that:

"There is a single connection between northern and southern California's power grids. I heard that Enron traders purposely overbooked that line, then caused others to need it. Next, by California's free-market rules, Enron was allowed to price-gouge at will."

=== Effects of partial deregulation ===
At the federal level, the Energy Policy Act of 1992, for which Enron had lobbied, opened electrical transmission grids to competition by unbundling generation and transmission of electricity.

At the state level, part of California's deregulation process, which was promoted as a means of increasing competition, was also influenced by lobbying from Enron and began in 1996, when California became the first state to deregulate its electricity market.

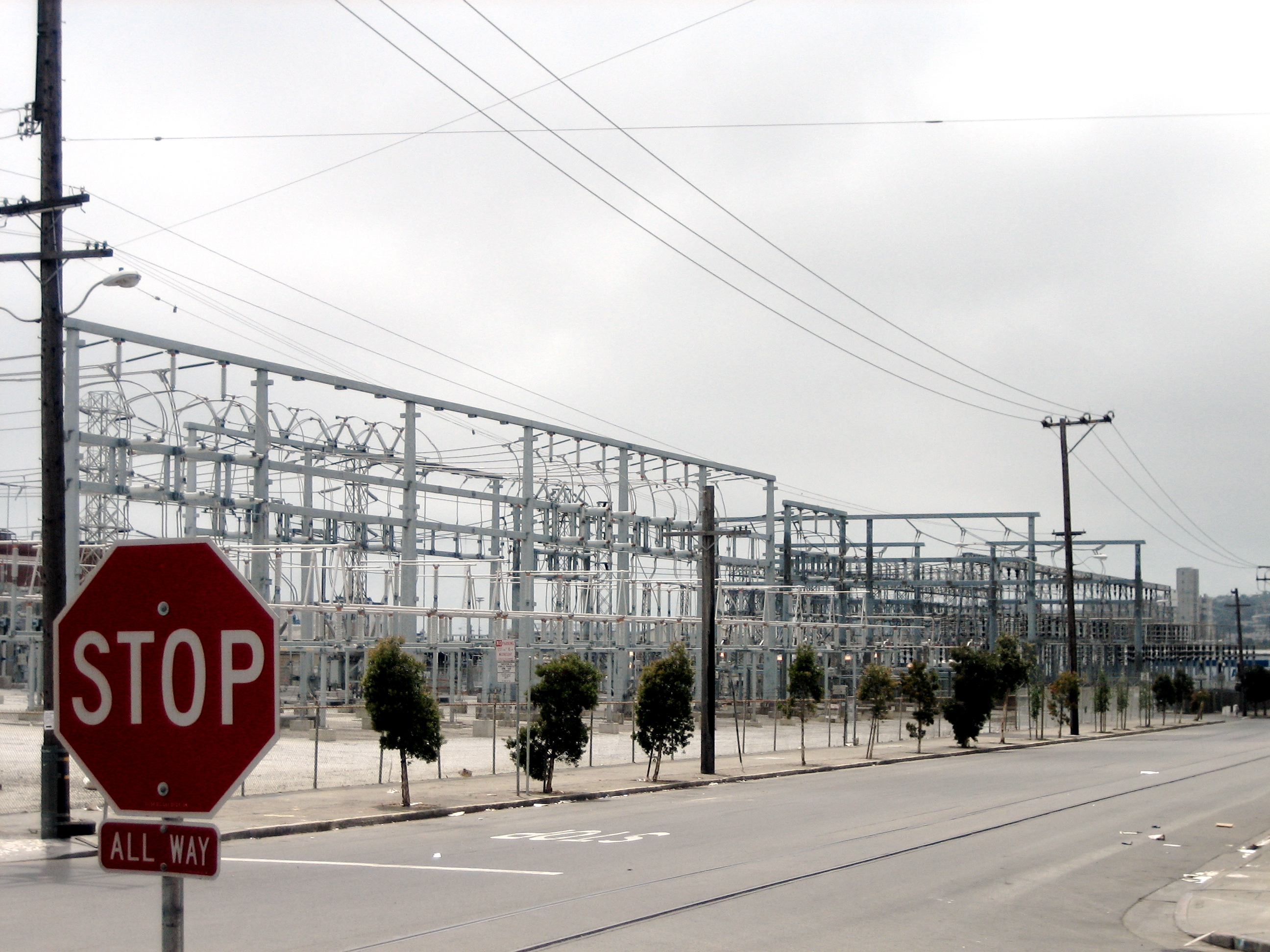
PG&E yard in San Francisco

Energy deregulation put the three companies that distributed electricity into a difficult situation. The energy deregulation policy froze or capped the price of energy that the three energy distributors could charge for electricity. Furthermore, distributors were not initially permitted to buy long-term energy contracts and were instead forced to procure electricity in short-term spot markets, increasing their exposure to price volatility. Deregulating energy producers did not lower energy costs. Deregulation did not encourage new producers to generate more electricity and drive down prices. Instead, as demand for electricity increased, energy producers charged higher prices for electricity. The producers used spikes in energy production to inflate energy prices. In January 2001, energy producers began shutting down plants in order to increase prices.

=== Government price caps ===
Retail electricity price caps limited the ability of utilities to pass rising wholesale costs on to consumers. In February 2001, California Governor Gray Davis stated, "Believe me, if I wanted to raise rates I could have solved this problem in 20 minutes." However, in San Diego, where San Diego Gas & Electric had paid off its debt, market rates began to be charged in July 1999. Prices doubled in two months because of a hot summer, and people protested by refusing to pay their bills and calling the power company.

Utilities were required to satisfy their expected electricity demand in California’s day-ahead power market rather than its real-time market. As a consequence of price caps, however, utilities were incentivized to submit false schedules with artificially low demand into the day-ahead market, depressing day-ahead prices without increasing real-time prices beyond the cap. In turn, the gap between day-ahead and real-time power created incentive for wholesalers to find ways to reclassify their day-ahead power as real-time. For example, in a market technique known as megawatt laundering, wholesalers bought electricity in California at below cap price, sold it out of state, and immediately re-imported it to sell at higher real-time prices.

When electricity demand in California rose, utilities had no financial incentive to expand production because long-term prices were capped. In some instances, wholesalers scheduled power transmission to create congestion and drive up prices.

After extensive investigation, the Federal Energy Regulatory Commission (FERC) substantially agreed in 2003:

"supply-demand imbalance, flawed market design and inconsistent rules made possible significant market manipulation as delineated in final investigation report. Without underlying market dysfunction, attempts to manipulate the market would not be successful."

"many trading strategies employed by Enron and other companies violated the anti-gaming provisions".

"Electricity prices in California's spot markets were affected by economic withholding and inflated price bidding, in violation of tariff anti-gaming provisions."

=== New regulations ===
In the mid-1990s, under Republican Governor Pete Wilson, California began restructuring its electricity industry. Democratic State Senator Steve Peace was the chairman of the Senate Committee on Energy at the time and is often credited as "the father of deregulation". The author of the bill was Senator Jim Brulte, a Republican from Rancho Cucamonga. Wilson publicly admitted that defects in the deregulation system would need to be fixed by "the next governor".

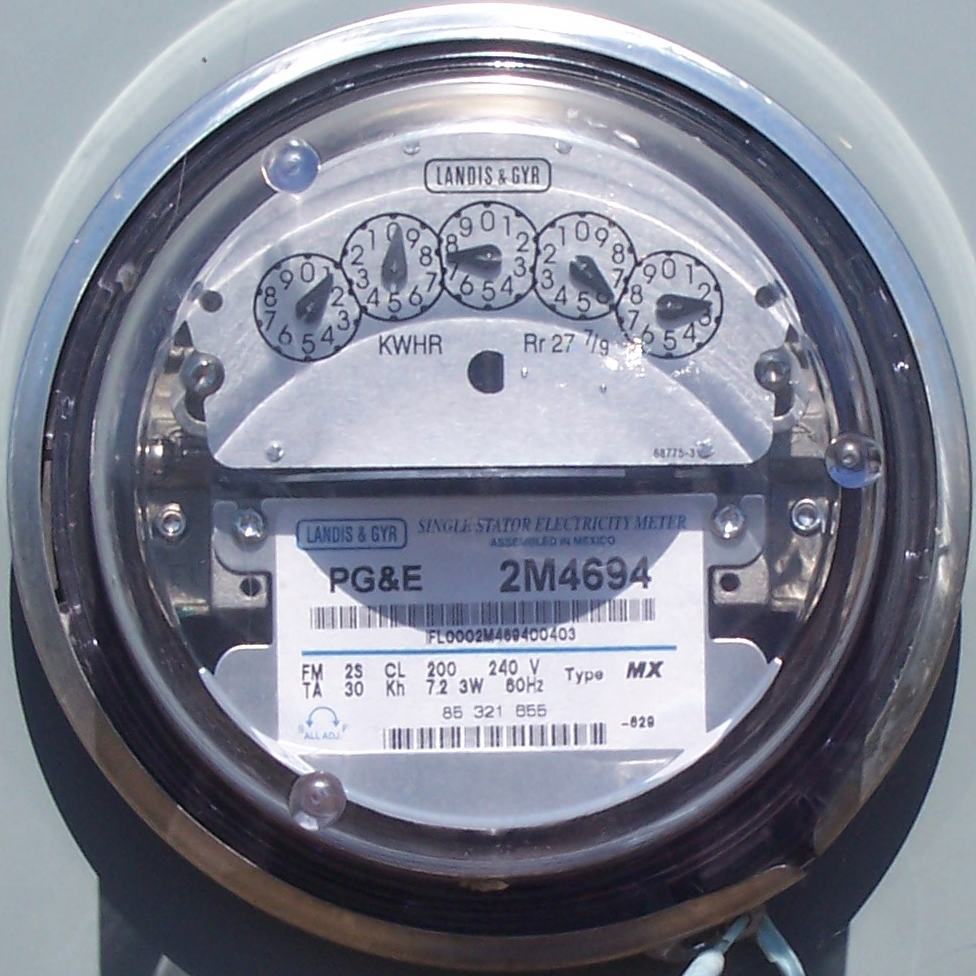
PG&E electric meter on Angel Island

=== Supply and demand ===
California's population increased by 13% during the 1990s. The state did not build any new major power plants during that time, and California's generation capacity decreased by 2 percent from 1990 through 1999, while retail sales increased by 11 percent.

California's utilities came to depend in part on imports of excess hydroelectric power from the Pacific Northwest states of Oregon and Washington. During that time, California relied on out-of-state generators to supply 7 to 11 gigawatts of power.

In the summer of 2001, a drought in the Northwest states reduced the amount of hydroelectric power available to California. Moreover, wholesale natural gas prices spiked nationwide, rising from around $2 per one million British thermal units (290 kilowatt-hours) at the beginning of 1999 to more than $10 per million BTU in the winter of 2000-2001.

The main line that allowed electricity to travel from the north to the south, Path 15, had not been improved for many years and became a major bottleneck that limited the amount of power that could be sent south to 3,900 MW.

The International Energy Agency estimates that a 5% reduction in demand would have resulted in a 50% price reduction during the peak hours of the 2000-2001 crisis. With better demand response, the market also becomes more resilient to the intentional withdrawal of offers from the supply side.

== Key events ==
Rolling blackouts affecting 97,000 customers hit the San Francisco Bay Area on June 14, 2000, and San Diego Gas & Electric Company filed a complaint in August 2000 alleging market manipulation by some energy producers. On December 7, 2000, because of low supply and idled power plants, the California Independent System Operator (ISO), which manages the California power grid, declared the first statewide Stage 3 power alert, meaning power reserves were below 3 percent. Rolling blackouts were avoided when the state halted two large state and federal water pumps to conserve electricity.

Most notably, the city of Los Angeles was unaffected by the crisis because government-owned public utilities in California (including the Los Angeles Department of Water & Power) were exempt from the deregulation legislation and sold their excess power to private utilities in the state, mostly to Southern California Edison, during the crisis. That enabled much of the greater Los Angeles area to suffer only rolling brownouts rather than long-term blackouts experienced in other parts of the state.

== Consequences of wholesale price rises on the retail market ==
As a result of the actions of electricity wholesalers, Southern California Edison (SCE) and Pacific Gas & Electric (PG&E) were buying electricity on the spot market at very high prices but were unable to raise retail rates. For a product that the IOUs used to produce for about three cents per kilowatt-hour of electricity, they were paying eleven to fifty cents, or occasionally even more, but they were capped at 6.7 cents per kilowatt-hour when charging their retail customers. As a result, PG&E filed for bankruptcy, and Southern California Edison devised a workout plan with the State of California to save the company from the same fate.

According to a 2007 study of Department of Energy data by Power in the Public Interest, retail electricity prices rose much more from 1999 to 2007 in states that adopted deregulation than in those that did not.

== Involvement of Enron ==
One of the energy wholesalers that became notorious for "gaming the market" and reaping large speculative profits was Enron Corporation. Enron CEO Kenneth Lay mocked the efforts of the California state government to thwart the practices of the energy wholesalers, insisting that "no matter what the 'crazy people in California' did, he had people working for him at Enron that could figure out a way to make money." The original statement was made during a phone conversation between S. David Freeman (chairman of the California Power Authority) and Lay in 2000, according to statements made by Freeman to the Senate Subcommittee on Consumer Affairs, Foreign Commerce and Tourism in April and May 2002.

Freeman, who was appointed chair of the California Power Authority in the midst of the crisis, made the following statements about Enron's involvement in testimony submitted to the Subcommittee on Consumer Affairs, Foreign Commerce and Tourism of the Senate Committee on Commerce, Science and Transportation on May 15, 2002:

"There is one fundamental lesson we must learn from this experience: electricity is really different from everything else. It cannot be stored, it cannot be seen, and we cannot do without it, which makes opportunities to take advantage of a deregulated market endless. It is a public good that must be protected from private abuse. If Murphy's Law were written for a market approach to electricity, then the law would state 'any system that can be gamed, will be gamed, and at the worst possible time.' And a market approach for electricity is inherently gameable. Never again can we allow private interests to create artificial or even real shortages and to be in control.

"Enron stood for secrecy and a lack of responsibility. In electric power, we must have openness and companies that are responsible for keeping the lights on. We need to go back to companies that own power plants with clear responsibilities for selling real power under long-term contracts. There is no place for companies like Enron that own the equivalent of an electronic telephone book and game the system to extract an unnecessary middleman’s profits. Companies with power plants can compete for contracts to provide the bulk of our power at reasonable prices that reflect costs. People say that Governor Davis has been vindicated by the Enron confession."

== Handling of the crisis ==
=== Governor Gray Davis ===
Some critics, such as Arianna Huffington, alleged that Davis was lulled into inaction by campaign contributions from energy producers. In addition, the California State Legislature would sometimes push Davis to act decisively by taking over power plants that were known to have been manipulated and placing them back under the control of the utilities, ensuring a steadier supply and punishing the worst manipulators. Meanwhile, conservatives argued that Davis signed overpriced energy contracts, employed incompetent negotiators, and refused to allow residential electricity prices to rise statewide as they did in San Diego, which they argued could have given Davis more leverage against the energy traders and encouraged greater conservation. Additional criticism is presented in the book Conspiracy of Fools, which details a meeting involving the governor and his officials, Clinton Administration Treasury officials, and energy executives, including market manipulators such as Enron, during which Davis disagreed with the Treasury officials and energy executives. They advised suspending environmental studies to build power plants and implementing a small rate hike to prepare for long-term power contracts (which Davis eventually signed overpriced ones, as noted above), while Davis supported price caps, denounced the other solutions as too politically risky, and allegedly acted rudely. The contracts Davis signed locked Californians into high electricity costs for the next decade. As of October 2011, electric rates in California had yet to return to pre-contract levels.

=== Arnold Schwarzenegger ===
On May 17, 2001, future Republican governor Arnold Schwarzenegger and former Los Angeles mayor Richard Riordan, a Republican, met with Enron CEO Kenneth Lay at the Peninsula Beverly Hills Hotel in Beverly Hills. The meeting was convened for Enron to present its "Comprehensive Solution for California," which called for an end to federal and state investigations into Enron's role in the California energy crisis.

On October 7, 2003, Schwarzenegger was elected governor of California to replace Davis. Over a year later, he attended the commissioning ceremony for a new Western Area Power Administration (WAPA) 500 kV line that remedied the power bottleneck on Path 15.

=== Congressional response to the crisis ===
In the spring of 2001, House Government Affairs Energy Policy and Regulatory Affairs Subcommittee chairman Doug Ose held a series of field hearings in California and Nevada, receiving testimony from Public Utilities Commission chair Loretta Lynch, FERC General Counsel Kevin Madden, California ISO President and CEO Terry Winter, and Central Valley farmers. During the hearings, the state and federal representatives blamed each other, but there was consensus that warning signs of the crisis had been repeatedly missed.

=== Federal Energy Regulatory Commission ===
The Federal Energy Regulatory Commission (FERC) was closely involved in the handling of the crisis beginning in the summer of 2000. There were at least four separate FERC investigations.

- The Gaming Case, which investigated general allegations of manipulation of the Western energy markets.
- The Enron Western Markets Investigation, FERC Docket Number PA02-2, which specifically investigating the involvement of Enron and other companies in manipulating the energy markets.
- The Refund Case, which involved the wide-ranging recovery of illegal profits made by some companies during the crisis.
- The Economic Withholding and Anomalous Bidding Case.

In December 2005, the Commission filed a report with Congress on its response to the California electricity crisis, which stated that "to date, the Commission staff has facilitated settlements resulting in over $6.3 billion".

On August 17, 2013, the British Columbia company Powerex agreed to a $750 million refund to settle charges of manipulating electricity prices during 2000.

== See also ==
- List of power outages
- Morgan Stanley Capital Group, Inc. v. Public Utility District No. 1, a United States Supreme Court case caused by this disaster.
