= Metropolitan Edison Co. v. People Against Nuclear Energy =

- Supreme Court of the United States

Argued March 1, 1983 Decided April 19, 1983
- Full case name: Metropolitan Edison Co. v. People Against Nuclear Energy, et al.
- Citations: 460 U.S. 766 (more) 103 S. Ct. 1556; 75 L. Ed. 2d 534; 1983 U.S. LEXIS 21; 51 U.S.L.W. 4371; 18 ERC (BNA) 1985; 52 P.U.R.4th 189; 13 ELR 20515

Holding
- The NEPA did not require the NRC to consider the conditions of PANE.

Court membership
- Chief Justice Warren E. Burger Associate Justices William J. Brennan Jr. · Byron White; Thurgood Marshall · Harry Blackmun; Lewis F. Powell Jr. · William Rehnquist; John P. Stevens · Sandra Day O'Connor

Case opinions
- Majority: Rehnquist, joined by unanimous
- Concurrence: Brennan

Laws applied
- National Environmental Policy Act

Metropolitan Edison Co. v. People Against Nuclear Energy, 460 U.S. 766 (1983), was a case decided by the United States Supreme Court.

== Background ==
After the meltdown of reactor number 2 at Three Mile Island, the People Against Nuclear Energy (PANE) contended that restarting reactor number 1 would cause severe psychological trauma to residents of nearby towns. When the NRC failed to consider this evidence in the statutorily required environmental impact statement, PANE sought review in the court of appeals, citing National Environmental Policy Act (NEPA) protections of the natural environment. The court granted the petition for review, and agreed with PANE that the NRC had acted improperly in failing to consider their evidence.

== Holding ==
The Court ruled that the Nuclear Regulatory Commission did not act improperly in not considering the conditions of PANE.

In considering such concerns as warm water released into the Susquehanna River, and the release of low level radiation, the NRC acted properly under § 102(C) of the NEPA in considering environmental risks.

=== Concurrence ===
Justice Brennan filed a concurring opinion, agreeing with the Court's reasoning, but noting that PANE's argument extended the chain of causation too far by attempting to link restarting the reactor with the hypothetical psychological injury of a "perception of risk."

== See also ==
- Jackson v. Metropolitan Edison Co. (1974)
- List of United States Supreme Court cases, volume 460
