= Steggall =

Steggall is a surname. Notable people with the surname include:

- Andy Steggall, English television sports presenter, producer and filmmaker
- Barry Steggall (born 1943), Australian politician
- Charles Steggall (1826–1905), English hymn writer and composer
- John Edward Aloysius Steggall (1855–1935), English mathematician
- Zali Steggall (born 1974), Australian skier
- Zeke Steggall (born 1971), Australian Olympic snowboarder
