= Steagall Amendment of 1941 =

United States price support law

The Steagall Amendment of 1941 (P.L. 77-144) was a US Federal law that required price support for many non-basic commodities at 85% of parity or higher during World War II.

In 1942, the minimum rate was increased to 90% of parity and was required to be continued for two years after the end of the war. The Steagall commodities included hogs, eggs, chickens (with certain exceptions), turkeys, milk, butterfat, certain dry peas, certain dry edible beans, soybeans, flaxseed and peanuts for oil, American-Egyptian (ELS) cotton, potatoes, and sweet potatoes.
