= United Gas Pipe Line Co. v. Mobile Gas Service Corp. =

- Supreme Court of the United States

Argued November 7–8, 1955 Decided February 27, 1956
- Full case name: United Gas Pipe Line Co. v. Mobile Gas Service Corp., et al.
- Citations: 350 U.S. 332 (more) 76 S. Ct. 373; 100 L. Ed. 2d 373; 1956 U.S. LEXIS 1650

Case history
- Prior: 215 F.2d 883 (3d Cir. 1954); cert. granted, 348 U.S. 950 (1955).

Holding
- A gas company could not unilaterally modify a rate in a contract on file with the Federal Power Commission

Court membership
- Chief Justice Earl Warren Associate Justices Hugo Black · Stanley F. Reed; Felix Frankfurter · William O. Douglas; Harold H. Burton · Tom C. Clark; Sherman Minton · John M. Harlan II

Case opinion
- Majority: Harlan, joined by unanimous

Laws applied
- National Gas Act, 15 U.S.C. § 717 et seq.

United Gas Pipe Line Co. v. Mobile Gas Service Corp., 350 U.S. 332 (1956), is a United States Supreme Court case in which the Court interpreted the Natural Gas Act of 1938 (NGA) as not allowing a gas supply company to unilaterally modify rates in a natural gas supply contract by filing a new rate schedule with the Federal Power Commission (FPC). Mobile Gas and its companion case Federal Power Commission v. Sierra Pacific Power Co. established the Mobile-Sierra presumption which holds that an electricity or natural gas supply rate established resulting from a freely negotiated contract is presumed to be "just and reasonable" and thus acceptable under the NGA or Federal Power Act (FPA).

== Background ==
The NGA was enacted in 1938 to regulate the interstate natural gas industry, including gas pipeline companies. The NGA regulated the rates charged by gas companies to their customers, which included local gas distribution companies and industrial users, through the filing by gas companies of rate schedules and contracts with customers. The NGA required gas companies to file tariffs of their new rates with the FPC, a federal administrative agency, at least thirty days prior to their becoming effective, and authorized the FPC to investigate rates to determine if they were in the public interest. The FPC could also suspend rates except for those involving gas supplied to industrial users while the investigating the rates.

In 1946 the Ideal Cement Company wanted to construct a cement plant in Mobile, Alabama. The local natural gas distribution company, Mobile Gas Service Company, entered into a ten-year contract with the United Gas Pipe Line Company to obtain gas at 10.7 cents per thousand cubic feet, which was at a substantially lower price than that charged for other gas customers, so that it could then provide the gas to the cement plant at 12 cents per thousand cubic feet. The contract between Mobile Gas and United Gas was filed with and approved by the FPC, and became part of the tariff and contracts on file for United Gas.

In June 1953 United Gas filed a new rate schedule with the FPC which purported to increase the rate for the natural gas for resale to the Ideal Cement plant to 14.5 cents per thousand cubic feet, which was a rate closer to that paid by other gas customers. Mobile Gas objected, stating that under the NGA United Gas could not unilaterally change the contract rate. The FPC ruled that the new rate, being a non-suspendable industrial rate under the NGA, would automatically become effective thirty days after it was filed unless it found the rate to be unlawful. Mobile Gas paid the new rate until April 15, 1955, when it assigned its contract with Ideal Cement to United Gas with the approval of the FPC. Since the only remaining issue was the alleged excess payment resulting from the difference between 10.7 and 14.5 cents per thousand cubic feet that Mobil Gas had paid to United Gas while responsible for the contract, the FPC ended its investigation regarding the validity of the new rate as it believed that its ruling would not have a retroactive effect.

Mobile Gas appealed the administrative decision of the FPC to the Court of Appeals for the Third Circuit, which reversed the decision and directed the FPC to reject the new tariffed rate in question and to order United Gas to refund the excess payments received under the new rate. The FPC and United Gas appealed the circuit court order to the Supreme Court, which granted certiorari.

== Opinion ==
The unanimous opinion by Justice Harlan noted that there was no allegation that the NGA was unconstitutional, so the only issue in the case involved the statutory interpretation of the NGA. The opinion stated that the provision in the NGA requiring the filing of rate schedules was not a rate setting procedure, but a prerequisite to the establishment of new rates. While the NGA required a gas company to file new rates and contracts with the FPC, it did not authorize the abrogation of any contract in effect. The FPC could investigate rates in contracts, but contracts could be modified or rejected by the FPC only if the rate in the contract was found to be so low as to be harmful to third parties and not in the public interest. Thus, a gas company had no authority to unilaterally change a rate in a contract by filing a new rate schedule with the FPC.

The opinion also explained that the NGA was different from the Interstate Commerce Act (ICA) then in effect, which required transportation companies to use the same rate schedule for all customers and did not authorize special rates to be set by contract with individual customers as the large number of customers engaged in interstate commerce did not permit an administrative agency to review contracts with special rates. In comparison, there were relatively few gas companies and customers, and the NGA’s authorization to set rates using contracts recognized that dedicated infrastructure and capacity with individualized costs might be required for a gas company to serve a customer. Based on this difference, the Court then distinguished the prior case of Armour Packing Co. v. United States (1908), where a contract between a shipper and a railroad used the same rate as in a rate schedule filed with the Interstate Commerce Commission (ICC). The railroad later filed a new rate schedule with the ICC. The Supreme Court held in that case that the new rate applied as the ICA, unlike the NGA, required the same rate schedule for all customers.

As the NGA did not authorize a gas company to change rates specified in its contracts unilaterally, the new rate schedule filed by United Gas was a nullity with respect to the gas provided for the Ideal Cement plant. As such, United Gas was required to refund the excess payments made under the new rate schedule to Mobile Gas.

== Subsequent events ==
The Supreme Court in the companion case FPC v. Sierra Pacific Power Co. found a similar result regarding contracts filed with the FPC involving electricity sales under the FPA. In later cases, the validity of rates set by contracts between gas and electric transmission companies became known as the Mobile-Sierra presumption. Under this presumption, an electricity or gas rate specified in a freely negotiated contract is presumed to be “just and reasonable” and thus acceptable under the FPA or NGA.

A later case which had facts similar to Mobile Gas, except that the contract between the gas pipeline company and customer stated that the applicable rate was the rate in the schedule filed with the FPC. In United Gas Pipe Line Co. v. Memphis Light, Gas, and Water Division (1958), the Supreme Court held that the gas company could revise the referenced gas rate in the contract by filing a new rate schedule with the FPC.

The cost of natural gas supplied by United Gas to the cement plant in Mobile, Alabama was the subject of a later Supreme Court decision, United Gas Pipe Line Co. v. Ideal Cement Co. (1962). The issue in that case was whether United Gas could recoup the cost of a tax levied by the City of Mobile on natural gas sales. The Supreme Court vacated a lower court ruling that the tax was actually a means of licensing a pipeline company’s right to enter the state, and stated that federal courts should abstain from ruling on complex state law issues which have not yet been resolved. This form of federal court abstention is based on the case of Railroad Commission v. Pullman Co. (1941) and is known as the Pullman abstention doctrine.

On October 1, 1977, the FPC was replaced by the Federal Energy Regulatory Commission.

== See also ==
- List of United States Supreme Court cases, volume 350
