= District of Columbia Public Service Commission =

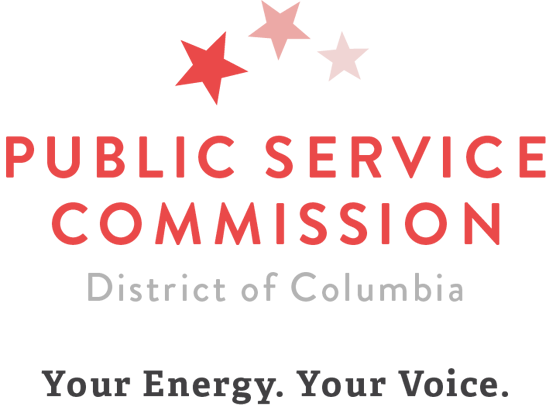

Agency overview
- Formed: 1913
- Preceding agency: Public Utilities Commission
- Jurisdiction: District of Columbia
- Headquarters: 1325 G Street NW, Washington, DC 20005
- Employees: 86
- Agency executive: Emile C. Thompson, Chairman
- Website: https://dcpsc.org/

The District of Columbia Public Service Commission (formerly the District of Columbia Public Utilities Commission) is an independent quasi-judicial body and regulatory agency responsible for regulating landline telephone, electricity, and gas utility companies operating within the District of Columbia. It was established by the US Congress in 1913.

All PSC staff involved in formal cases are advisors to the Commissioners, including the Offices of the General Counsel (OGC), Technical and Regulatory Analysis (OTRA), and Consumer Services (OCS). The Office of the Commission Secretary and the Administrative Offices provides mediation services to consumers and businesses regarding complaints against utility service providers. OTRA also manages the natural gas pipeline safety program in the District.

== History ==
The PSC was created by act of Congress on March 4, 1913, after President William Howard Taft signed into law the District of Columbia Appropriations Act, which authorized the Public Utilities Commission (name changed to PSC in 1964) to "furnish service and facilities reasonably safe and adequate" to ensure that any charges were reasonable, just and nondiscriminatory; and it initially had jurisdiction over electric, gas, and telephone companies, including mass transit, such as street cars, buses, and public motor vehicles. In 1974, the Home Rule Act affirmed the PSC as an independent charter agency. Since 1913, 72 men and women have served as Commissioners.

== Commissioners ==
The current commissioners are: Commissioner Richard A. Beverly, Chairman Emile C. Thompson and Commissioner Ted Trabue.

== Grid modernization ==
Power Path DC is the PSC’s grid modernization plan to achieve a reliable, sustainable and resilient energy delivery system in the District.

== See also ==
- List of members of the Council of the District of Columbia
- National Association of Regulatory Utility Commissioners
- Neighborhoods in Washington, D.C.
- Political party strength in Washington, D.C.
- Public Utilities Commission
- Washington Metropolitan Area Transit Commission - interstate compact agency regulating common carriers in Washington DC and surrounding counties in Maryland and Virginia
