= Companion case =

The term companion cases refers to a group of two or more cases which are consolidated by an appellate court while on appeal and are decided together because they concern one or more common legal issues. Depending on the facts of each case, the court may be able to achieve a final resolution of all such cases (e.g., by affirming summary judgment in all of them), or it may have to remand one or more of them for further proceedings such as a trial. In general, one of the companion cases comes first on the case caption and serves as the title of the consolidated opinion that resolves the group of cases.

Appellate courts do not always have to consolidate cases in order to resolve several pending cases with a common legal issue. A related method is to "grant and hold", meaning that while a "lead" case presenting an increasingly common issue is being briefed and argued, all other similar cases that come into the same appellate court are granted review but then are put on hold pending the outcome of the lead case. Once the lead case is decided, the other cases are promptly remanded to the lower courts from which they originated, with directions on how to resolve them in light of the opinion issued in the lead case.

In some instances, companion cases with similar—but not identical—fact patterns are decided with different outcomes, allowing the court to establish fine dividing lines between outcomes revolving on the specific differences in the facts of each case.

== Examples ==
The best known examples are at the Supreme Court of the United States. Roe v. Wade famously had a companion case, Doe v. Bolton. McLaurin v. Oklahoma State Regents was a companion case of Sweatt v. Painter.

Administrative boards can also have companion cases, sometimes for more than a dozen cases decided at once.

== See also ==
- Rule of four
