= Federal Power Commission v. Sierra Pacific Power Co. =

- Supreme Court of the United States

Argued November 8, 1955 Decided February 27, 1956
- Full case name: Federal Power Commission v. Sierra Pacific Power Co.
- Citations: 350 U.S. 348 (more) 76 S. Ct. 368; 100 L. Ed. 2d 388; 1956 U.S. LEXIS 1651

Case history
- Prior: 223 F.2d 605 (D.C. Cir. 1954), amended by 237 F.2d 756 (D.C. Cir. 1955); cert. granted, 349 U.S. 937 (1955).
- Subsequent: 351 U.S. 946 (1956) (motion to amend denied).

Holding
- A contract rate filed under the Federal Power Act is unlawful only if the rate is so low as to affect the public interest by being unduly discriminatory, excessively burdensome to consumers, or a threat to continued service.

Court membership
- Chief Justice Earl Warren Associate Justices Hugo Black · Stanley F. Reed; Felix Frankfurter · William O. Douglas; Harold H. Burton · Tom C. Clark; Sherman Minton · John M. Harlan II

Case opinion
- Majority: Harlan, joined by unanimous

Laws applied
- Federal Power Act, 15 U.S.C. § 824 et seq.

Federal Power Commission v. Sierra Pacific Power Co., 350 U.S. 348 (1956), is a United States Supreme Court case in which the Court interpreted the Federal Power Act (FPA) as permitting the Federal Power Commission (FPC) to modify a rate specified in a contract between an electric utility and distribution company only upon a finding that the contract rate is unlawful because it adversely affects the public interest. Sierra Pacific and its companion case United Gas Pipe Line Co. v. Mobile Gas Service Corp. established the Mobile-Sierra doctrine, which holds that an electricity or natural gas supply rate established resulting from a freely negotiated contract is presumed to be "just and reasonable" and thus acceptable under the FPA or Natural Gas Act (NGA).

== Background ==
The Federal Water Power Act was amended in 1935 and renamed the FPA and reorganized the FPC. It also regulated all interstate transmission of electricity. Under the FPA, a power company could establish a rate by either filing a new rate schedule thirty days prior to its effective date or by filing a contract with a wholesale customer. The FPC could suspend a newly filed rate and establish an administrative proceeding to investigate it for its reasonableness, and it could investigate filed contracts to determine if they were unlawful.

The Sierra Pacific Power Company distributed electricity in northern Nevada and eastern California and purchased the majority of its power from a California electric utility, the Pacific Gas and Electric Company (PG&E), which was subject to regulation under the FPA. In 1947, because of increased post-war power demand and consumer desire for less expensive electricity, Sierra Pacific began negotiating for new supplies, including with the Bureau of Reclamation, which had excess capacity available from the recently completed Shasta Dam. PG&E then offered Sierra Pacific a fifteen-year power supply contract, which Sierra Pacific accepted in June 1948.

In early 1953 after excess power from the Shasta Dam was no longer available, PG&E without the consent of Sierra Pacific filed a new rate schedule with the FPC purporting to increase the rate to Sierra Pacific by 28%. The FPC suspended the rate until September 6, 1953, and initiated an administrative proceeding to determine the reasonableness of the new rate. Sierra Pacific intervened but its motion to reject the new rate because the contract could not be changed without its consent was rejected by the FPC. In 1954 the FPC issued an order upholding its decision not to reject the new rate and finding it to be not "unjust, unreasonable, unduly discriminatory, or preferential." On appeal by Sierra Pacific, the Court of Appeals for the District of Columbia, holding that the contract rate could only be changed upon a finding that it was unreasonable, reversed the FPC order and remanded it without prejudice to the FPC initiating a new proceeding to determine the reasonableness of the contract rate. The Supreme Court granted certiorari because of the importance of the case to the administration of the FPA.

== Opinion ==
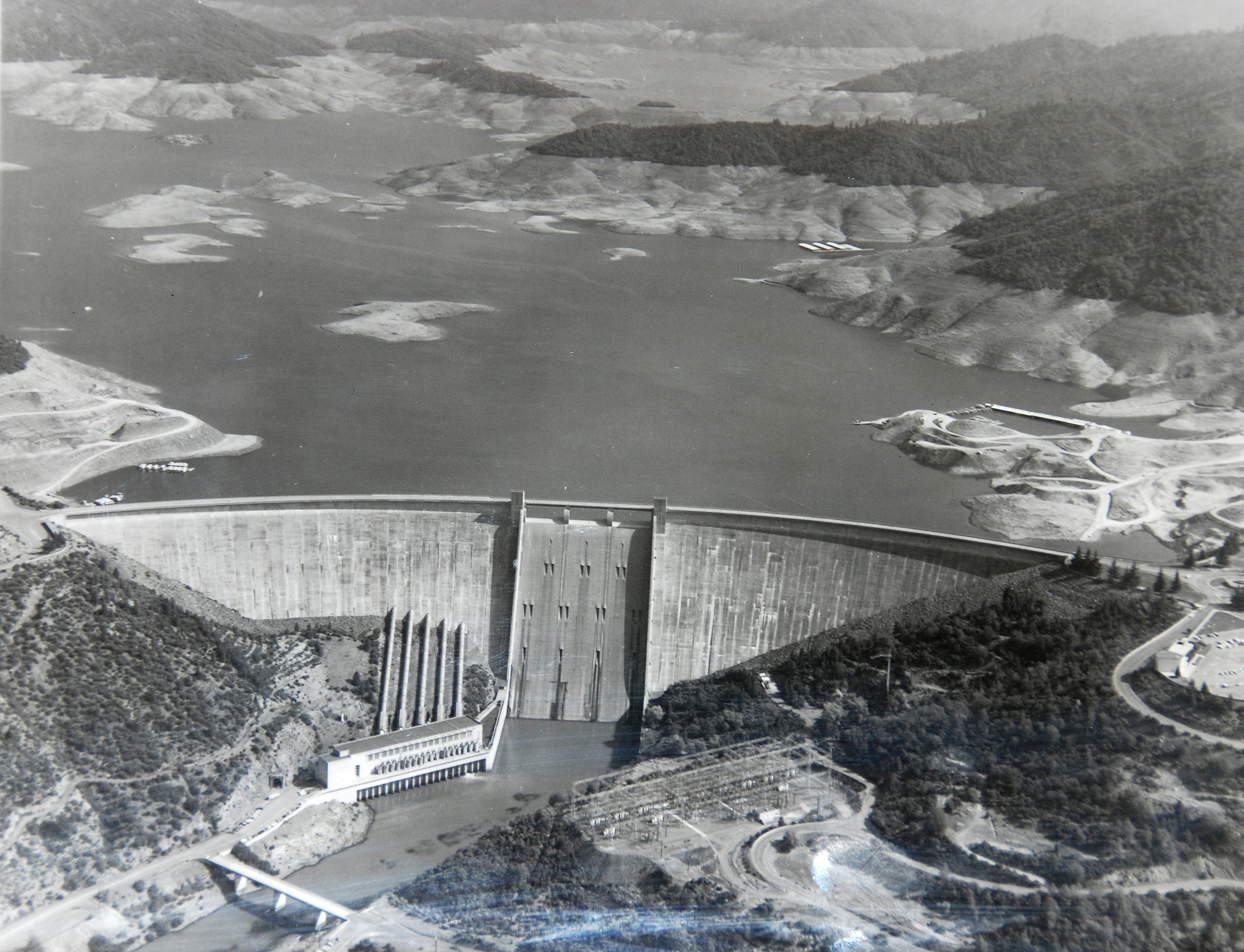
The availability of low cost power from the newly constructed Shasta Dam resulted in a 15-year power supply contract with a low rate in 1948, which the Supreme Court held could not later be unilaterally changed by the supplier.

The unanimous opinion by Justice Harlan noted two issues in the case. First, since the relevant provisions of the FPA are substantially equivalent to those of the NGA, the Court held that, under the holding of Mobile Gas, the filing of a new rate schedule and the proceeding to review it was not effective to supersede the contract rate. Mobile Gas held that the NGA did not authorize a unilateral contract change, and that holding also applied to the FPA.

Secondly, the FPA also allows the FPC to set aside a contract upon a determination that the rate is unlawful. The parties during the FPC proceeding had stipulated that a reasonable or fair rate of return (ROR) for PG&E was 5.5%, and that the contract rate provided a ROR of 2.6% while the new filed rate schedule provided a ROR of 4.75%, which was the lowest that PG&E stated it would accept. The FPC had in its order found that the 1948 contract rate to be unreasonably low and unlawful because of its low ROR. The Supreme Court, however, noted that while a regulatory agency such as the FPC may not normally impose upon a public utility a ROR that is less than the fair ROR, it did not follow that the public utility may not itself agree by contract to a ROR that is less than the fair ROR, or that if it does so, that it is entitled to regulatory relief of its improvident bargain. Under the FPA, the proper standard for determining whether a contract rate is unlawful is whether the rate is so low as to adversely affect the public interest, such as having been unduly discriminatory to third parties, excessively burdensome to consumers, or a threat to continued service to the utility company.

== Subsequent events ==
The Supreme Court in its companion case Mobile Gas found a similar result regarding contracts filed with the FPC involving electricity sales under the NGA. In later cases, the validity of rates set by contracts between gas and electric transmission companies became known as the Mobile-Sierra doctrine. Under this doctrine, an electricity or gas rate specified in a freely negotiated contract is presumed to be "just and reasonable" and thus acceptable under the FPA or NGA.

On October 1, 1977, the FPC was replaced by the Federal Energy Regulatory Commission.

In Morgan Stanley Capital Group, Inc. v. Public Utility District No. 1 of Snohomish County (2008), the Supreme Court determined that the Mobile-Sierra doctrine also applied when the burden of the improvident contract was on the purchaser. The case was remanded to determine if the contract negotiated during the California electricity crisis of 2000–2001 was the result of market manipulation, which would eliminate one premise on which the Mobile-Sierra doctrine rests: that the contract rates are the product of fair, arms-length negotiations.
