= Tax Reform Act of 1976 =

US Tax Code changes in 1976

The Tax Reform Act of 1976 was passed by the United States Congress in September 1976, and signed into law by President Gerald Ford on October 4, 1976, becoming Pub. L. 94–455.

The act increased the percentage standard deduction to 16% ($2,800 max) and minimum standard deduction to $2,100 (joint returns). The general tax credit (max of $35/capita or 2% of $9,000 income) was temporarily extended, and small business tax rates were temporarily lowered through 1977.

For the first time in US history, the Tax Reform Act of 1976 established tax incentives designed to encourage the preservation of historic structures – "sixty years after architectural obsolescence had first been officially recognized in the US tax code."

The act delayed decreasing in the investment tax credit through 1980. It expanded the individual minimum tax and increased the long-term capital gains holding period from 6 months to 1 year.

A unified rate schedule for estate and gift taxes with a $175,000 exemption was created.

The act also created the 501(h) election procedure, allowing 501(c)(3) non-profit organizations to choose to participate in legislative lobbying limited by the annual financial expenditure on that lobbying, rather than its overall extent.

The act also included a provision preventing states from enacting taxes on electricity companies that discriminated on out of state customers. This was relevant to the ongoing court case of Arizona v. New Mexico and ultimately provided the basis for the ruling in Arizona Public Service Co. v. Snead.

== Capital Gains ==
The previous major tax legislation (Tax Reform Act of 1969) had established a 10% minimum tax and while it had left long-term capital gains under $50,000 to continue to qualify for the 25 percent alternative capital gains tax rate, it increased the rate on gains over $50,000 to 29.5 percent in 1970, 32.5 percent in 1971, and 35 percent (one-half the 70 percent top tax rate applicable to ordinary income) in 1972 and later years.

This Act increased the minimum tax rate to 15%. The Act also increased the holding period defining long-term capital gains, which receive preferential tax treatment, from six months to one year.
