= Foundation (United States law) =

Type of charitable organization in the United States

A foundation in the United States is a type of charitable organization. Though, the Internal Revenue Code distinguishes between private foundations (usually funded by an individual, family, or corporation) and public charities (community foundations and other nonprofit groups that raise money from the general public). Private foundations have more restrictions and fewer tax benefits than public charities like community foundations.

== History ==
The two most famous philanthropists of the Gilded Age pioneered the sort of large-scale private philanthropy of which foundations are a modern pillar: John D. Rockefeller and Andrew Carnegie. The businessmen each accumulated private wealth at a scale previously unknown outside of royalty, and each in their later years decided to give much of it away. Carnegie gave away the bulk of his fortune in the form of one-time gifts to build libraries and museums before divesting almost the entirety of his remaining fortune in the Carnegie Foundation and the Carnegie Corporation of New York. Rockefeller followed suit (notably building the University of Chicago) and gave nearly half of his fortune to create the Rockefeller Foundation.

Meanwhile, in 1914, Frederick H. Goff, a well-known banker at the Cleveland Trust Company, sought to eliminate the "dead hand" of organized philanthropy and so created the first community foundation in Cleveland. He created a corporately structured foundation that could utilize community gifts in a responsive and need-appropriate manner. Scrutiny and control resided in the "live hand" of the public as opposed to the "dead hand" of the founders of private foundations.

Starting at the end of World War II, the United States' high top income tax rates spurred a burst of new foundations and trusts, many of which were simply tax shelters. President Harry S. Truman publicly raised this issue in 1950, resulting in a federal law later that year that brought new rigor and definition to the practice. The law did not go very far in regulating tax-exempt foundations, however—a fact made obvious throughout the rest of that decade as financial advisers continued to push the foundation-as-tax-refuge model to wealthy families and individuals. Several attempts at passing a more complete reform during the 1960s culminated in the Tax Reform Act of 1969, which remains the controlling legislation in the United States.

== Types ==
In the United States, an entity with "foundation" in its name is generally expected, in most cases, to be a charitable foundation. Nonetheless, an organization may have the word "foundation" in its name and not be a charitable foundation—though state law may impose restrictions. For example, Michigan permits its use only for nonprofits with "the purpose of receiving and administering funds for perpetuation of the memory of persons, preservation of objects of historical or natural interest, educational, charitable, or religious purposes, or public welfare". The distinction between charitable organizations and non-profit organizations elaborates on this point.

The Internal Revenue Code defines many kinds of non-profit organizations that do not pay income tax. However, only charitable organizations can receive tax-deductible contributions and avoid paying property and sales tax. For instance, a donor would receive a tax deduction for money given to a local soup kitchen if the organization was classified as a 501(c)(3) organization, but not for giving money to the Green Bay Packers, even though the NFL team is a 501(c)(6) non-profit association. Neither a public charity nor a foundation can pay for or participate in partisan political activity, unless they surrender tax-exempt status including voiding the deductibility of any tax deductions for donors after the surrender or revocation date.

Tax-exempt charitable organizations fall into two categories: public charities and private foundations. A community foundation is a public charity. The US Tax Code in 26 USCA 509 governs private foundations. Meanwhile, 26 USCA 501(c)(3) governs public charities.

=== Community foundation ===
Community foundations are instruments of civil society designed to pool donations into a coordinated investment and grant-making facility dedicated mostly to the social improvement of a given place. In other words, a community foundation is like a public foundation. This type of foundation requires community representation in the governing board and grants made to improve the community. Often, a city has a community foundation with a governing board composed of many leaders of the business, religious, and local interests. Grants that the community foundation makes must benefit the people of that city.

Express public involvement and oversight in community foundations allow their classification as public charities rather than private foundations.

=== Private foundation ===
Private foundations typically have a single major source of funding (usually gifts from one family or corporation rather than funding from many sources) and most have as their primary activity the making of grants to other charitable organizations and to individuals, rather than the direct operation of charitable programs. When a person or a corporation founds a private foundation frequently family members of that person or agents of the corporation are members of the governing board. This limits public scrutiny over the private foundation, which entails unfavorable treatment compared to community foundations.

The differing treatment of private foundations compared to public charities including community foundations is as follows:

- A foundation must pay out 5% of its assets each year while a public charity may not.
- Donors to a public charity receive greater tax benefits than donors to a foundation.
- A public charity must collect at least 10% of its annual expenses from the public to remain tax-exempt while a foundation does not.

==== Operating and non-operating ====
For tax purposes, there are a few variants of private foundations. The material difference is between "operating" foundations and "grant-making" foundations. Operating foundations use their endowment to achieve their goals directly. Grant-making foundations use their endowment to make grants to other organizations, which indirectly carry out the goals of the foundation. Operating foundations have preferential tax treatment in a few areas, including allowing individual donors to contribute more of their income and allowing grant-making foundation contributions to count towards the 5% minimum distribution requirement.

== Legal requirements ==
=== Private foundation ===
The Tax Reform Act of 1969 defined the fundamental social contract offered to private foundations. In exchange for exemption from paying most taxes and for limited tax benefits being offered to donors, a private foundation must (a) payout at least 5% of the value of its endowment each year, none of which may be to the private benefit of any individual; (b) not own or operate significant for-profit businesses; (c) file detailed public annual reports and conduct annual audits in the same manner as a for-profit corporation; (d) meet a suite of additional accounting requirements unique to nonprofits.

Administrative and operating expenses count towards the 5% requirement; they range from trivial at small unstaffed foundations, to more than half a percent of the endowment value at larger staffed ones. Congressional proposals to exclude those costs from the payout requirement typically receive much attention during boom periods when foundation endowments are earning investment returns much greater than 5% (such as the late 1990s); the idea typically fades when foundation endowments are shrinking in a down market (such as 2001–2003).

== See also ==
- Foundation (nonprofit)
- 501(c) organization
- Supporting organization
- Nonprofit organization
