= Not-for-profit organization =

Legal entity that retains surplus funds

A not-for-profit organization (NFPO) is a legal entity that does not distribute surplus funds to its members and is formed to fulfill specific objectives.

While not-for-profit organizations and nonprofit organizations (NPO) are distinct legal entities, the terms are sometimes used interchangeably. An NFPO must be differentiated from a NPO as they are not formed explicitly for the public good as an NPO must be, and NFPOs are considered "recreational organizations", meaning that they do not operate with the goal of generating revenue as opposed to NPOs.

== Functions ==
An NFPO does not have the same obligation as an NPO to serve the public good, and as such it may be used to apply for tax-exempt status as an organization that serves its members and does not have the goal of generating profit. An example of this is a sports club, which exists for the enjoyment of its members and thus would function well as an NFPO, with revenue being re-invested into improving the organization.

These organizations typically file for tax exemption in the United States under section 501(c)(7) of the Internal Revenue Code as social clubs. Common ventures for which NFPOs are established include:

- Charities
- Sports clubs
- Foundations
- Private schools
- Universities
- Museums
- Churches
- Social welfare organizations

Charities, as NFPOs, function under the premise that any revenue generated should be used to further their charitable missions rather than distribute profits among members. This revenue might come from donations, fundraising, or other activities undertaken to support their charitable cause.

== See also ==
- 501(c) organization
- Community organization
- Fundraising
- Nonprofit organization
- Mutual organization
- Non-commercial activity
- Non-governmental organization
- Nonprofit organization laws by jurisdiction
- Non-profit organizations and access to public information
- Non-profit technology
- Public-benefit nonprofit corporation
- Supporting organization (charity)
- United States non-profit laws
- Voluntary sector
