= 501(h) election =

Procedure in United States tax law

A 501(h) election or Conable election is a procedure in United States tax law that allows a 501(c)(3) non-profit organization to participate in lobbying limited only by the financial expenditure on that lobbying, regardless of its overall extent. This allows organizations taking the 501(h) election to potentially perform a large amount of lobbying if it is done using volunteer labor or through inexpensive means. The 501(h) election is available to most types of 501(c)(3) organizations that are not churches or private foundations. It was introduced by Representative Barber Conable as part of the Tax Reform Act of 1976 and codified as 26 U.S.C. § 501(h), and the corresponding Internal Revenue Service (IRS) regulations were finalized in 1990.

== Lobbying restrictions ==
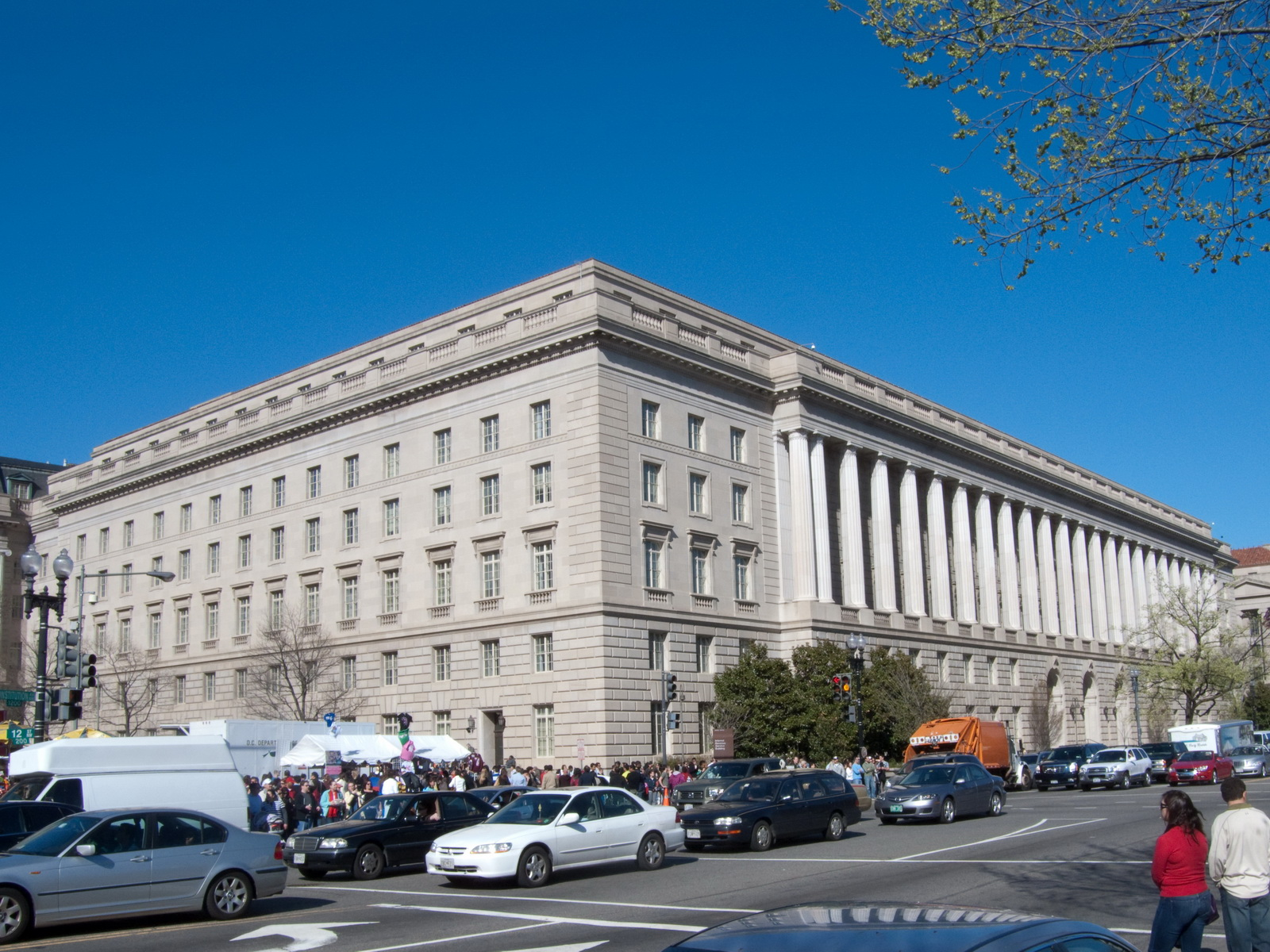
The Internal Revenue Service (headquarters pictured) regulates lobbying by tax-exempt organizations. Most 501(c)(3) organizations may switch from a subjective "substantial part test" to an objective "expenditure test" by making a 501(h) election.

501(c)(3) organizations, named after the section of the Internal Revenue Code that defines them, are U.S. nonprofit organizations with principally charitable, educational, or religious missions. They make up 74% of all tax-exempt organizations as of 2013.

By default, 501(c)(3) organizations are subject to a provision that "no substantial part of the activities [may be] carrying on propaganda, or otherwise attempting, to influence legislation". This test, called the substantial part test, is subjective and not precisely defined by the IRS, potentially making it difficult for organizations engaging in policy advocacy to determine whether they are in compliance with the law. For organizations that have made the 501(h) election, this test is replaced with an expenditure test which is based only on the annual financial expenditure, with no other limits on the extent of their lobbying activities. An organization may take the 501(h) election by filing a one-page form with the IRS, which remains in effect until revoked by the organization. The 501(h) election is not available to churches or to private foundations.

Lobbying is defined as attempting to influence legislation, and is divided into two categories. The first, direct lobbying, occurs through communication with any member or staff of Congress, or of a state or local legislature, or any government official participating in the formulation of legislation. The second, grassroots lobbying, is attempting to affect the opinion of the general public on legislation, although some communications to an organization's own members are excluded from this classification.

The limit on lobbying expenditure is calculated as a fraction of the organization's total tax-exempt expenditures. For organizations with $500,000 or less of total tax-exempt expenditures in a given year, no more than 20% of that amount may be spent on lobbying. Decreasing percentages are allowed for organizations with higher tax-exempt expenditures, with an absolute spending cap of $1,000,000 eventually being reached. Lobbying expenses above the allowed amount are subject to a 25% excise tax, and excessive lobbying over a four-year period may lead to loss of tax-exempt status. This cap applies to the sum of direct and grassroots lobbying expenses. Grassroots lobbying is also subject to its own limit, which is one quarter of the total lobbying cap. Regardless of their 501(h) status, 501(c)(3) organizations may not participate in electoral campaigns or support specific candidates for office, a prohibition that has been in effect since the passage of the Johnson Amendment in 1954. Also, funds derived from federal government or private foundation grants or contracts may never be used for lobbying.

== Effects ==
The expenditure caps provide a safe harbor for non-profit organizations engaging in policy advocacy. Because the limitation is expressed solely in terms of dollar amounts, organizations can effectively perform a large amount of lobbying if it is done through volunteer labor or through inexpensive media such as email or websites. However, the 501(h) election is not advantageous for very large non-profits whose lobbying expenditures exceed the $1,000,000 total cap or the $250,000 grassroots lobbying cap. These organizations may still be able to justify the expenditures as insubstantial if their operating budget is much larger, although it does entail increased risk.

Multiple commentators have called non-profit lobbying beneficial because it balances lobbying by for-profit corporations. Tufts University political science professor Jeffrey Berry wrote in The Washington Post that, given that many non-profits are health care or social service providers, "they are the foot soldiers in a largely private system that delivers critical services to the disadvantaged. They are often closer to the problems—and the solutions—than the policymakers in city halls, state capitals and Washington." In initially enacting the provision, Congress intended to increase the flow of information from non-profits to the legislative process. Senator Edmund Muskie said of an early version of a lobbying reform bill in 1971 that "it is fundamental to our constitutional system that [tax-exempt organizations] should have equal access along with business groups and others in presenting views to Congress."

Nevertheless, as of 2009, only 1.3 percent of eligible 501(c)(3) organizations had taken the 501(h) election according to one count. A 2003 survey of non-profits found a widespread but erroneous belief that non-profit organizations were banned from political advocacy of any sort, with little awareness of the 501(h) election. This was attributed to the long gap between the provision's enactment by Congress in 1976 and the publications of final rules by the IRS in 1990 and the complexity of the 501(h) provisions, as well as the IRS's lack of interest in publicizing the provision.

A 2013 survey of executive directors of non-profit organizations in Boston found that the organizations were 6.3 times more likely to engage in policy advocacy if they had taken a 501(h) election than those who did not.

== History ==
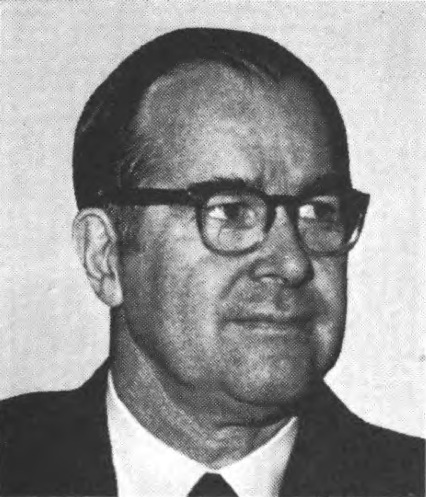
Representative Barber Conable introduced the 501(h) election as part of the Tax Reform Act of 1976.

=== Background ===
Lobbying restrictions on non-profits date to Department of the Treasury regulations in 1919. These regulations denied tax-exempt status to organizations that engaged in "dissemination of controversial propaganda," which included political advocacy. In the influential 1930 case Slee v. Commissioner, the American Birth Control League's tax-exempt status was revoked due to its publication of a magazine supporting the repeal of birth control laws, despite its other charitable activities.

The substantial part test was enacted as part of the Revenue Act of 1934. One justification given for this limitation was that donating money to influence legislation was "selfish" and not charitable if it enhanced the donors' personal interests, although the lack of a total ban on lobbying implied that non-selfish lobbying could be permitted. Subsequent cases important to political advocacy by non-profits include Seasongood v. Commissioner, Speiser v. Randall, and Cammarano v. United States. In 1966, the Sierra Club's tax-exempt status was revoked in a high-profile case due to its publications of advertisements in The New York Times and The Washington Post opposing the construction of dams in the Grand Canyon.

=== Enactment ===
The 501(h) election was enacted in the Tax Reform Act of 1976 which was introduced by Representative Barber Conable, after several attempts to introduce various similar provisions beginning in 1969. There were several justifications given for the mechanics of the new option: correcting the vagueness of the substantial part test; ensuring that small organizations were not more restricted than large ones; providing a tax penalty for initial infractions rather than immediate loss of tax-exempt status; and increasing the lobbying influence of non-profit organizations relative to for-profit ones, the later of which were at the time able to deduct their lobbying expenses.

IRS regulations implementing the specifics of the 501(h) election were not finalized until 1990. An initial 1987 proposal of regulations was criticized for being overly broad in what constituted grassroots lobbying, such as including mention of legislation in a fundraising letter, or allowing audience members at public forums to publicly express opinions about legislation, which would cause the entire cost of these activities to be applied as lobbying expenses. The public reaction to the proposed regulations lead to a congressional hearing in the House Ways and Means Subcommittee on Oversight in March 1987, followed by the establishment of an advisory board within the IRS to revise the proposed regulations. The final 1990 regulations were less stringent, excluding fundraising communications from lobbying activities and establishing the four-year window for violations before tax-exempt status would be revoked.
