= San Juan Generating Station =

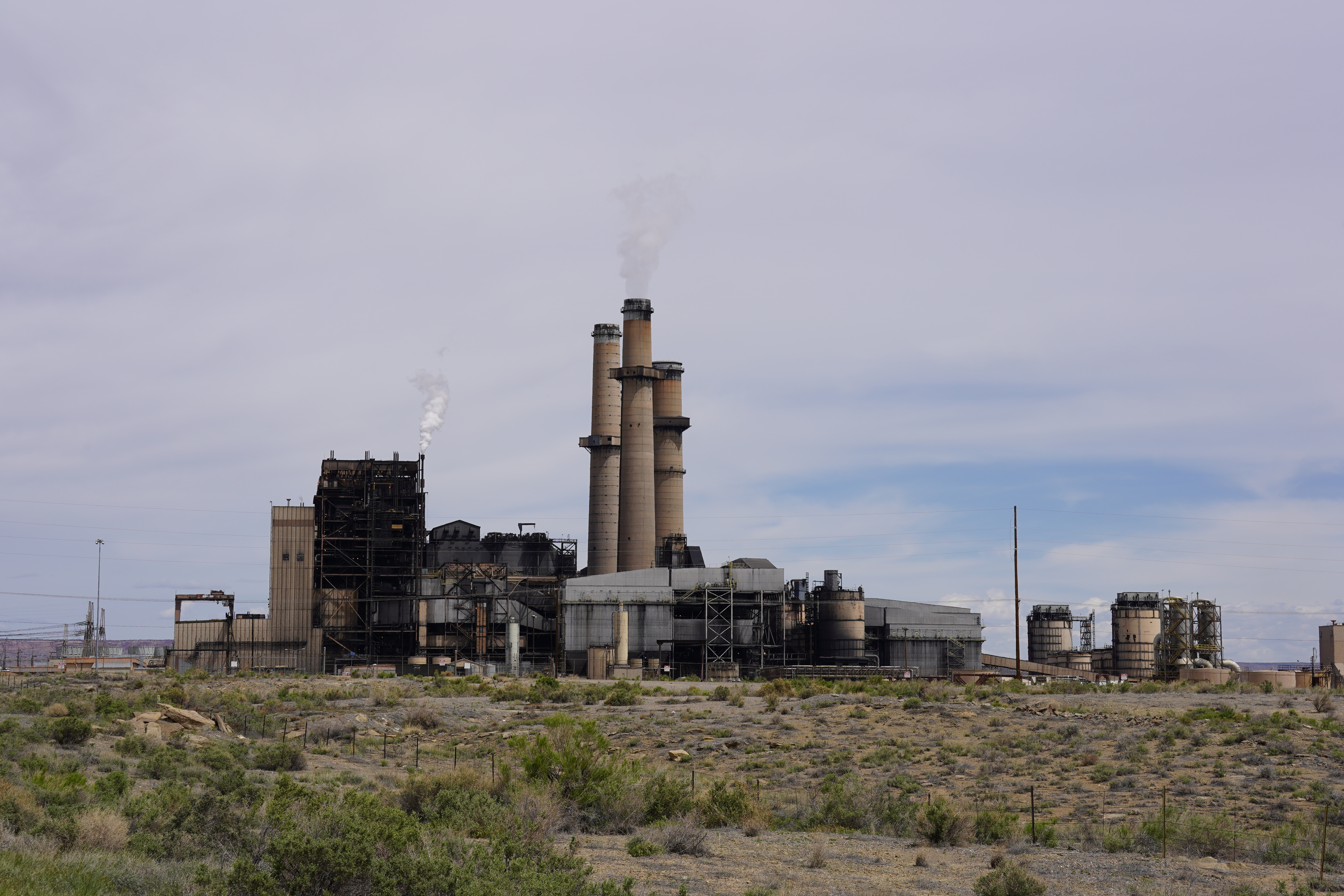
- Country: United States
- Location: Near Fruitland, New Mexico
- Coordinates: 36.802°N 108.439°W
- Status: Demolished
- Commission date: Unit 1: 1973; Unit 2: 1976; Unit 3: 1979; Unit 4: 1982
- Decommission date: Unit 1: 2022; Unit 2: 2017; Unit 3: 2017; Unit 4: 2022
- Owners: PNM (66%); Tucson Electric Power (20%); City of Farmington (5%); Los Alamos County (4%); Utah Associated Municipal Power Systems (4%)

Thermal power station
- Primary fuel: Sub-bituminous coal

Power generation
- Units decommissioned: Unit 1 (340 MW); Unit 2 (340 MW); Unit 3 (496 MW); Unit 4 (507 MW)
- Nameplate capacity: 847 MW (2018)
- Annual net output: 4,674 GWh (2018)

External links
- Commons: Related media on Commons

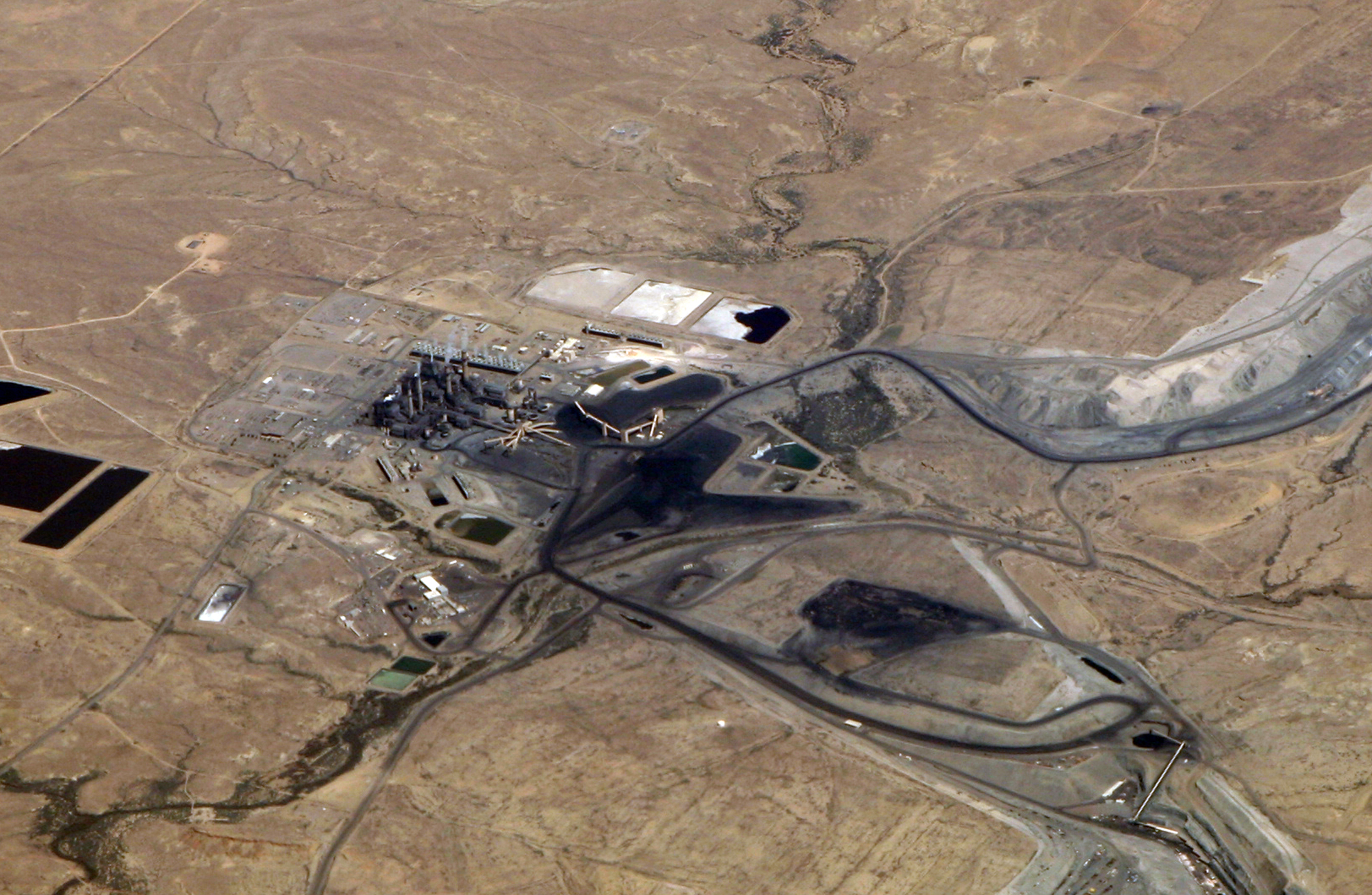
Aerial view of the generating station and coal mine

The San Juan Generating Station is a decommissioned coal-fired electric power plant located by its coal source, the San Juan Mine, near Waterflow, New Mexico, between Farmington and Shiprock in San Juan County, New Mexico. Its majority owner is Public Service Company of New Mexico, and other owners include Tucson Electric Power and the Farmington Electric Utility System. The Four Corners Generating Station in the Navajo Nation was located nearby; combined, these two power plants were among the largest point-source pollution emitters in the United States.

Units 2 and 3 (369 and 555 MW, completed in 1976 and 1979, respectively) were retired in 2017. The plant produced power at $45/MWh in 2018 and 2019. Unit 1 (369 MW, completed in 1973) was retired in June 2022. Unit 4 (555 MW, completed in 1982) was retired in October 2022. The city of Farmington announced the end of a plan the city had to acquire the generating station and run it with a partner as part of a carbon capture and utilization system. The closure of the plant and associated mine has resulted in the loss of hundreds of jobs along with tens of millions of dollars in annual tax revenue used to fund schools and a community college. The plant’s water reservoir was sold to the U.S. Bureau of Reclamation in 2023 to provide a reliable and sustainable water supply to Navajo homes and businesses. The reservoir was renamed the Frank Chee Willetto Reservoir.

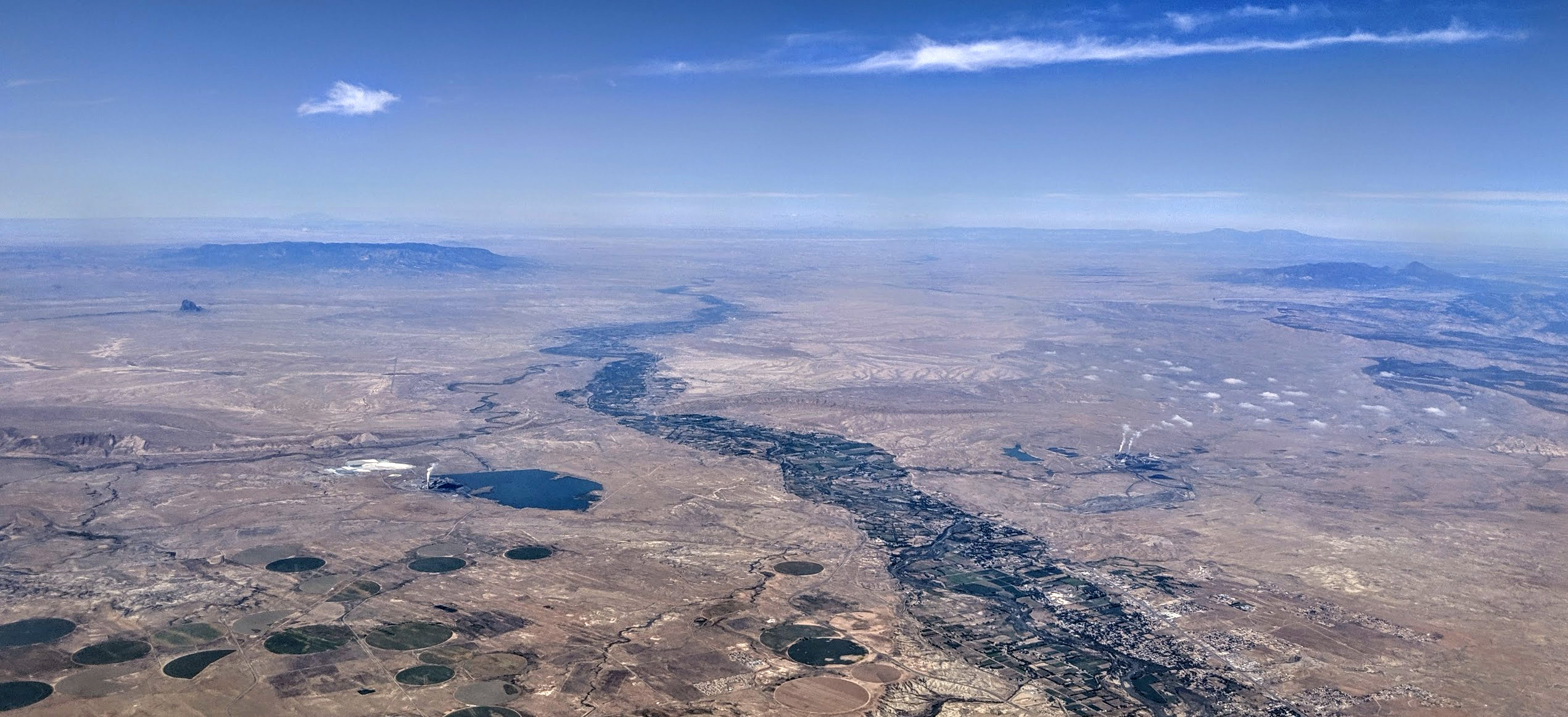
Aerial view of Four Corners Generating Station on Navajo Nation land (south, left) and San Juan Generating Station (north, right), separated by the San Juan River between Farmington (foreground) and Shiprock (background)
