= Arizona Public Service Co. v. Snead =

- Supreme Court of the United States

Argued February 26, 1979 Decided April 18, 1979
- Full case name: Arizona Public Service Co., et al. v. Snead, Director of Revenue Division, Taxation and Revenue Department of New Mexico, et al.
- Docket no.: 77-1810
- Citations: 441 U.S. 141 (more) 99 S. Ct. 1629; 60 L. Ed. 2d 106; 1979 U.S. LEXIS 32

Case history
- Prior: Arizona Public Service Co. v. O'Chesky, 91 N.M. 485, 576 P.2d 291 (1978)

Holding
- New Mexico's energy tax on the generation of electricity is invalid under the Supremacy Clause.

Court membership
- Chief Justice Warren E. Burger Associate Justices William J. Brennan Jr. · Potter Stewart; Byron White · Thurgood Marshall; Harry Blackmun · Lewis F. Powell Jr. William Rehnquist · John P. Stevens

Case opinions
- Majority: Stewart, joined by Burger, Brennan, Marshall, Blackmun, Powell, Stevens
- Concurrence: Rehnquist, joined by White

Laws applied
- 15 U.S.C. § 391

Arizona Public Service Co. v. Snead, 441 U.S. 141 (1979), was a United States Supreme Court case in which the Court held that a New Mexico tax on the generation of electricity was invalid under the Supremacy Clause of the United States Constitution. Snead was the director of the New Mexico Taxation and Revenue Department.

== Background ==
Most of the electricity generated at the Four Corners Generating Station located in northwest New Mexico is transmitted for export and sold in neighboring states. In 1975 New Mexico enacted the Electrical Energy Tax Act, which imposed a tax on the amount of electricity generated by power plants. The tax amounted to about 2 percent of the retail value of electricity. The Act further allowed electric companies in New Mexico to credit the amount of this tax against their existing tax liability from an existing 4 percent gross receipts tax on retail sales of electricity, essentially eliminating the effect of the tax upon New Mexico's in-state users of electricity. Electricity generated from in-state power plants but exported for sale to out-of-state customers did not have any gross receipts tax liability to credit the energy tax against.

The five out-of-state electric companies with an ownership interest in the Four Corners Generating Station, Arizona Public Service Company, Southern California Edison, Public Service Company of New Mexico, Salt River Project, Tucson Electric Power, and El Paso Electric, filed an action in the district court of Santa Fe County seeking a declaratory judgment that the New Mexico energy tax was unconstitutional and void. In addition to the ownership interest in the Four Corners Generating Station, Tucson Electric Power also had a part ownership interest in the San Juan Generating Station and El Paso Electric owned and operated the Rio Grande Generating Station, both of which were also located in New Mexico.

While the state district court case was pending, Arizona filed a motion with the U.S. Supreme Court regarding the New Mexico energy tax. The motion requested authorization to file an action against New Mexico under the Court's original jurisdiction. In Arizona v. New Mexico, the Court denied the motion, noting that the pending state court case was the appropriate forum for litigation of the same issues involving the New Mexico energy tax.

After opposing motions for summary judgment were filed in the district court, the court ruled for New Mexico. The electric companies appealed the case to the New Mexico Supreme Court. While the appeal was pending before the court, the United States Congress enacted the Tax Reform Act of 1976 and included a provision regarding the New Mexico energy tax. The provision, codified at 15 U.S.C. § 391, stated:

No State, or political subdivision thereof, may impose or assess a tax on or with respect to the generation or transmission of electricity which discriminates against out-of-State manufacturers, producers, wholesalers, retailers, or consumers of that electricity. For purposes of this section a tax is discriminatory if it results, either directly or indirectly, in a greater tax burden on electricity which is generated and transmitted in interstate commerce than on electricity which is generated and transmitted in intrastate commerce.

The New Mexico Supreme Court issued a ruling in 1978 and found that the state energy tax was valid. The court concluded, if the total tax burden on the electric companies was considered, that since the tax on electricity generated was applicable to both electricity sold in-state and out-of-state, and that the credit against the state gross receipts tax was available to both in-state and out-of-state electric companies, it did not result in a discriminatory tax burden. The electric companies then appealed to the U.S. Supreme Court, claiming that the tax violated the Commerce and Export-Import Clauses of the Constitution and was invalid under 15 U.S.C. § 391.

== Opinion of the Court ==
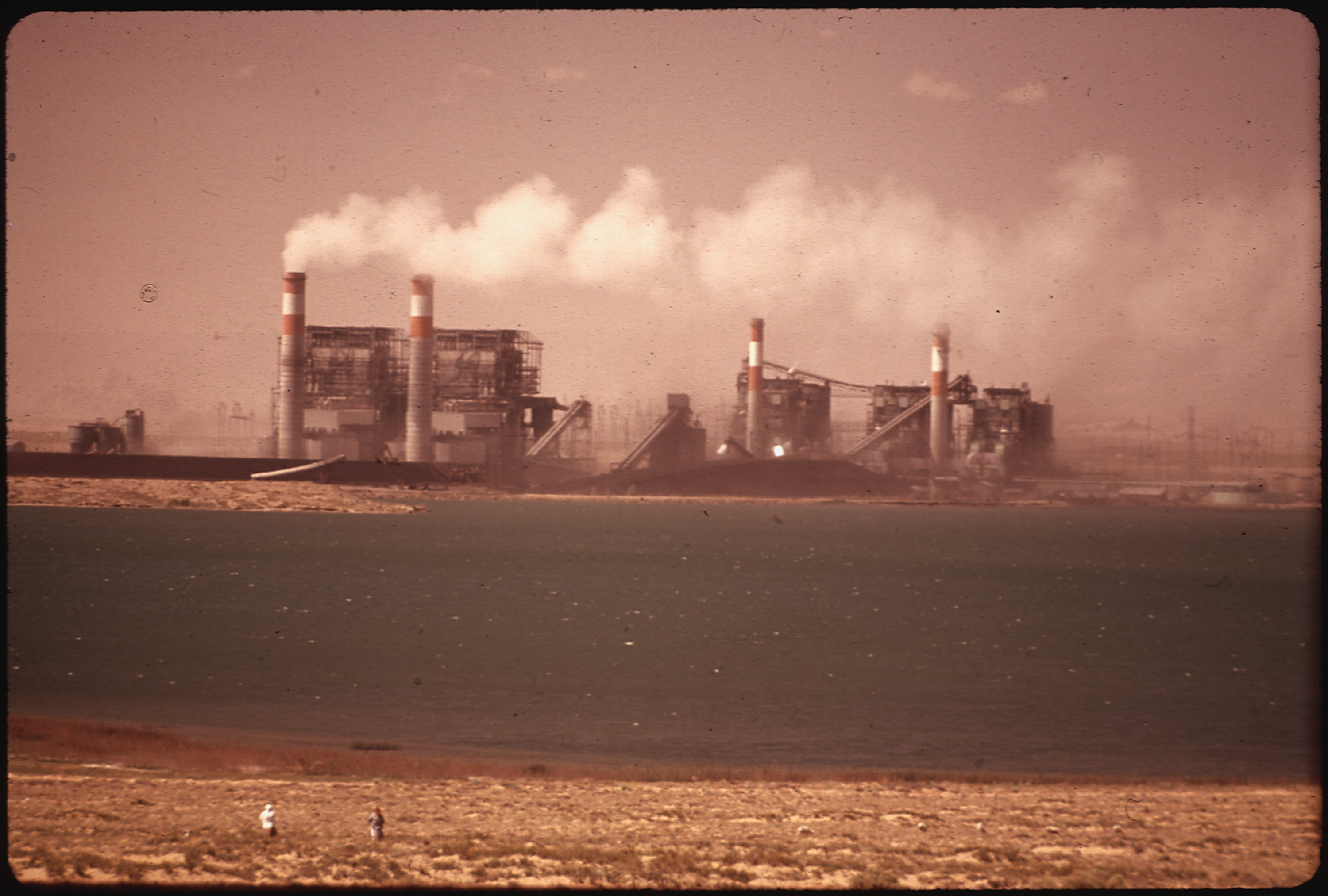
New Mexico attempted to tax the electricity generated and exported out-of-state from the Four Corners Generating Station, shown in a 1972 photograph.

The Supreme Court reversed the New Mexico Supreme Court, holding that the New Mexico energy tax was invalid under the Supremacy Clause since it violated 15 U.S.C. § 391. The Court noted that the statute was directed specifically at a state tax on generation or transmission of electricity and not on the overall tax burden of electric companies. As the New Mexico Electrical Energy Tax on generation ensured locally consumed electricity had no tax burden, it violated that statute. The Court stated that Congress, in enacting the ban on these types of state taxes and against the New Mexico tax in particular, had broad authority under the Commerce Clause to regulate interstate commerce, as the Court had held in cases such as Katzenbach v. McClung, Heart of Atlanta Motel Inc. v. United States, and Wickard v. Filburn.

In a concurring opinion, Justice Rehnquist with whom Justice White joins, noted that when 15 U.S.C. § 391 had been discussed by the Senate, it had been stated that the statute had supposedly been drafted to do no more than what the Commerce Clause would accomplish on its own terms. However, the statute did more than that, and forbids the New Mexico energy tax.
