= Supporting organization (charity) =

Legal category of charity in the United States

IRS Supporting Organization Flow Chart

A supporting organization, in the United States, is a public charity that operates under the US. Internal Revenue Code in 26 USCA 509(a)(3). A supporting organization either makes grants to, or performs the operations of, a public charity similar to a private foundation.

However, unlike donations to a private foundation, donations to a supporting organization garner the same higher deduction rate as donations to public charities. However, supporting organizations allow less control over the organization to the founders than private foundations. The Internal Revenue Code calls a public charity that relies on a supporting organization a "supported organization".

== History ==
The Tax Reform Act of 1969 created private foundations and imposed greater restrictions on this classification, including excise taxes and lower donor deductions for contributions. This Act created supporting organizations as an exception to private foundations—because they are organized, operated, and controlled in the public interest. Supporting organizations are not subject to the problems and abuses found in foundations that led to the creation and associated restrictions on private foundations.

== Reform ==
=== Past impact and criticism ===
Mostly large and medium-sized donors created supporting organizations in order to retain some control over their donated assets. Type III supporting organizations comprised the sort of supporting organization with the least surveillance by the supported organizations, which meant greater donor control, and so Type III supporting organizations quickly became the favored form.

Despite this flexibility, few donors outside of high and middle-high value donors created supporting organizations due to complex regulations and tax code provisions governing the formation and operation of supporting organizations. This entailed high transaction costs. Further, the demands of the tax code and associated regulations required the Type III supporting organizations to make such great relative donations of activity or grants to assure the attentiveness of the supported organizations.

As a consequence, supporting organizations (particularly Type III) proved attractive to high and middle-high value donors with anecdotal evidence of their widespread abuse.

Supporting organizations became subject to much criticism upon two perceived abuses.

One perceived abuse related to control. Senators Baucus and Grassley argued that supporting organizations, particularly Type III, allowed donors to retain too much control over their assets.

Another perceived abuse related to liberal charitable deductions allowed to donors who contribute to supporting organizations. Since donors retained so much control, these critics believed that they should not also enjoy deductions that they would get for donating to public charities. Instead, these critics argued that such deductions should be no more favored than private organizations or even less favored because of the greater control afforded to supporting organizations compared to private foundations.

=== Pension Protection Act of 2006 ===
The Pension Protection Act of 2006 cracked down on supporting organizations, particularly Type III. This act applied further regulations and penalties that took away many of the privileges that supporting organizations had over private foundations. The act applies the self-dealing regulations of private foundations on supporting organizations. The act requires a payout—but leaves the exact demands of the payout, including rate and from which assets for the Treasury to determine later. The Act applied the private foundation rules of excess business holdings and the excess benefit prohibitions from the private foundation law. The act also tightened the tests for Type III supporting organizations to demonstrate that Type III supporting organizations has dependent supported organizations and that has no more than five supported organizations. The act also made collateral attacks on supporting organizations by forbidding donor-advised funds and private foundations from making qualifying distributions to Type III supporting organizations, and should they do so the distributions would become taxable subject to their respective excise taxes. Further restrictions, including explication of the payout rate contours will result from the Congress mandated survey that the IRS promulgated.

=== Congress-mandated survey ===
In the Pension Protection Act, Congress mandated a study on the supporting organizations to understand their role in the exempt organization world and determine what future action remained necessary. It was called the "Study on Donor Advised Funds and Supporting Organizations."

== Definition ==
Under § 509(a)(3) the Internal Revenue Code defines supporting organizations as being:

- (A) is organized, and at all times thereafter is operated, exclusively for the benefit of, to perform the functions of, or to carry out the purposes of one or more specified organizations described in section 509(a)(1) or (2); and
- (B) is (i) operated, supervised, or controlled by one or more organizations described in paragraph (1) or (2), (ii) supervised or controlled in connection with one or more such organizations, or (iii) operated in connection with one or more such organizations; and
- (C) is not controlled directly or indirectly by one or more disqualified persons (as defined in 26 USCA 4946) other than foundation managers and other than one or more organizations described in section 509(a)(1) or (2).

=== 509(a)(3)(A) ===
Is organized, and at all times thereafter is operated, exclusively for the benefit of, to perform the functions of, or to carry out the purposes of one or more specified organizations described in paragraph 509(a)(1) or (2)

This section breaks down into two tests: the organizational test ("is organized") and the operational test ("is operated").

- The organizational test demands that the supporting organization organize and operate exclusively to support one or more specified publicly supported charities. Here, the supporting organization must have its governing documents limit the organization to charitable purposes for specified supported organizations. An exception exists for the specification requirement when the two organizations have a continuous and historic relationship.
- The operational test demands that the supported organization operate exclusively for the benefit of, to perform the functions of, or to carry out the purposes of one or more specified organizations described in § 509(a)(1) and (2).

=== 509(a)(3)(B) ===
Is (i) operated, supervised, or controlled by one or more organizations described in paragraph (1) or (2), (ii) supervised or controlled in connection with one or more such organizations, or (iii) operated in connection with one or more such organizations

This part provides three possible relationships between a supporting organization and its supported organizations. A supporting organization must fulfill the requirements of one of these three types and report it in its annual reporting to the IRS. Through either of these relationships the supported organizations provides the requisite public scrutiny over the supporting organizations. Type I resembles a parent-subsidiary relationship. Type II resembles a brother-sister relationship. These two types are the stricter of the relationships while Type III has the most relaxed standard for scrutiny by the supported organizations. In exchange for this flexibility, type III supporting organizations must pass two additional tests to ensure that the supported organizations provide public scruinty. The first test is the responsiveness test and the second test is the integral part test. The integral part test may further breakdown into two subtests, the "but for" subtest and the "attentiveness" subtest, either of which the organization may satisfy. This type III relationship, however, recently has received a crackdown by Congress and so its flexibility and relaxed standards for control and scrutiny is short-lived.

=== 509(a)(3)(C) ===
Is not controlled directly or indirectly by one or more disqualified persons (as defined in 26 USCA 4946) other than foundation managers and other than one or more organizations described in paragraph 509(a)(1) or (2)

This requirement provides prophylactic protection against self-dealing, a potential abuse. Some donors try to engage in self-dealing activities in order to maintain control over their assets by controlling the supporting or supported organizations. This requirement curbs nearly every possible way a donor may exert control over the organizations and their assets.

== Restrictions imposed by the Pension Protection Act of 2006 ==
=== 509(f) ===
Through the Pension Protection Act, Congress recently added (f) to § 509. Section 509(f) adds new requirements for supporting organizations.

Under § 509(f)(1), the IRC imposes new requirements on type III supporting organizations in particular. Here, they impose a stricter definitions upon their relationships with their supporting organizations:

- (A) The IRC does so by amending the responsiveness test to require the type III supporting organization to provide any documentation to their supporting organization that the IRS deems necessary;
- (B) Further, type III supporting organization may no longer support foreign entities.

In § 509(f)(2), the IRC concentrates on organizations controlled by donors:

- (A) Where a type III supporting organization may not have a relationship with a public charity that accepts donations from a person defined, in (B), otherwise known as a disqualified person or a close relative or spouse of that disqualified person. "Person" includes 35% controlled business entities.

(3) codifies the present understanding of "supported organization" as a public charity supported by a supporting organization.

=== Charitable trust ===
For an organization to qualify as a type III supporting organization, it must first prove that it constitutes a charitable trust under state law, the beneficiary is the supported trust, and the supported organization has the power to compel an accounting and enforce the trust. Then, the organization must provide further evidence to prove that it operates in connection with its supported organizations.

=== Functionally integrated ===
A functionally integrated type III supporting organization ("FISO") performs the operations of the supported organization and remains free the excess business holding excise tax and from the payout rate that shall apply in the near future. A FISO resembles a type III supporting organization that satisfies the "but for" test because they both perform the operations of the supported organization, but the exact requirements for qualifying as a FISO remains unknown. Currently, the IRS has halted determinations on all requests by organizations for FISO classification until the US Treasury Department issues guidance on this matter.

=== Excess benefit transaction ===
A disqualified person may not receive any benefit from a supporting organization otherwise the IRS may apply intermediate sanctions that tax that person 25% of the value of the benefit and tax the manager 10% of the benefit. This tax may increase further if the offenders fail to rectify the transaction and lead up to revocation of tax-exempt status.

=== Excess business holdings ===
A supporting organization in combination with its disqualified persons may not own more than 20% of voting stock in a business entity not related to the furtherance of its charitable purpose. Should a supporting organization do so, then it may subject itself to the excise tax.

== Treasury regulations ==
The Treasury Regulations for supporting organizations contain detailed explanations for the applicable tests. The regulations may change as the IRS has suspended determinations of what constitutes a functionally integrated type III supporting organization until such time that the Treasury Department may issue further guidance.

== See also ==
- Foundation (nonprofit organization)
- Private foundation
- Private foundation (USA)
- Supporting Organization vs. Private Foundation
