= Bombay and Bandra Bakar Kasai Jamat Mosques Trust =

Bakar Kasai Jamaat Mosques Trust
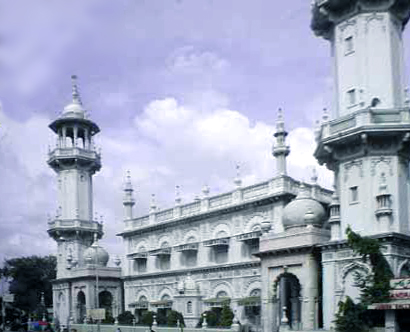
- Jama Masjid, Bandra, a mosque built and maintained by BKJ
- Abbreviation: BKJ
- Founded: 1720; 306 years ago
- Type: Non-operating private foundation
- Purpose: Islamic worship, education, and culture
- Headquarters: Jama Masjid, Bandra
- Location: Mumbai, Maharashtra, India
- Origins: South Mumbai
- Region served: Mumbai
- Website: bkjmosquetrust.in

The Bombay and Bandra Bakar Kasai Jamat Mosques Trust (BKJ) is a non-operating private foundation, responsible for the construction and management of Islamic mosques, madrasas, and cultural centres, based in Mumbai, in the state of Maharashtra, India. The trust was established in 1720 and is one of the oldest trusts in India.

== History ==
Bakar Kasai Jamaat was originally headquartered in South Mumbai, but later shifted to Bandra, a suburb of Mumbai. The trust was initiated by a group of goat merchants and butchers from Mumbai. The trust runs various social initiatives like mosques, schools and cultural centres.

Political dignitaries like Rahul Gandhi have visited institutes run by the trust.

== Facilities administered or built ==
=== Mosques ===
- Jama Masjid, Bandra
- Naupada Masjid and Kabrastan, a mosque and graveyard

=== Education ===
- Bandra Urdu High School
- Bandra Crescent English School
- Junior College of Science, Commerce & MCVC

=== Cultural centres ===
- Jamaat Khana, Bandra

== See also ==
- Islam in India
- List of mosques in India
