= Non-profit organization laws in the U.S. =

United States non-profit laws relate to taxation, the special problems of an organization which does not have profit as its primary motivation, and prevention of charitable fraud. Some non-profit organizations can broadly be described as "charities" — like the American Red Cross. Some are strictly for the private benefit of the members — like country clubs, or condominium associations. Others fall somewhere in between — like labor unions, chambers of commerce, or cooperative electric companies. Each presents unique legal issues.

== Taxation ==
If an organization is to qualify for tax exempt status, the organization's (a) charter — if a not-for-profit corporation — or (b) trust instrument — if a trust — or (c) articles of association — if an association — must specify that no part of its assets shall benefit any people who are members, directors, officers or agents (its principals). As well the organization must have a legal, charitable purpose, i.e. the organization must be created to support educational, religious, or charitable activities. These elements do not mean that the organization cannot pay employees or contractors for work or services they render to the organization. This limitation means that as long as the organization operates within its exempt purposes and it maintains an endowment or uses any excess revenue to further develop its activities it will not be taxed by the Internal Revenue Service.

Such a surplus — that is, whatever part of its income is left after its operating expenses are paid — which might be considered similar to "profit" — must be spent on the charitable or public purpose(s) for which it was organized, not paid as a dividend or benefit to anyone associated with running or organizing it.

=== Federal taxes ===
Not only must the organization meet the requirements that the state where it is organized sets for non-profits, but it must also meet complex IRS regulations. These regulations are used not only to determine if the organization is exempt from tax under the organization's activities as a non-profit organization. If the organization purpose is one of those described in §501(c)(3) of the Internal Revenue Code, it may apply for a ruling that donations to it are tax deductible to the persons or business entities who make them. The organization itself will be exempt from taxation as long as it does not engage in unrelated business activities. Such organizations are then required to file Form 990.

As well the IRS has enacted intermediate sanctions should the members of the organization engage in practices that may excessively benefit any of the organization's members (or officers, directors, etc.) rather than revoking the organization's exempt status (which was the only option available before the adoption of intermediate sanctions) the IRS may now levy a penalty on the organization for engaging in a transaction that resulted in a private inurement or private benefit. See the entry on intermediate sanctions for more detailed information.

=== Differing requirements at the state and federal levels ===
The State Laws are organized to initiate the non-profit process which is required by the Internal Revenue Service (IRS) to apply for non-profit status. Some States lack Laws that require non-profits that do not get approved for Federal tax exemption to amend their business type to for profit. It is clear that the https://www.usa.gov/start-nonprofit states that United States non-profit laws relate to taxation, not just activities that benefit the public. Most States require the Federal tax exemption approval via a "determination letter" to apply to become State tax exempt. The steps required to become a nonprofit include applying for tax-exempt status. If States do not require the "determination letter" from the IRS to grant non-profit tax exemption to organizations, on a State level, claiming non-profit status without that Federal approval, then they have actually violated Federal United States Nonprofit Laws. Many State lawmakers do not have knowledge of these facts and therefore do not realize they are non-compliant.

== Organization ==
Generally, non-profits and people operating non-profits must comply with all of the same laws which would apply to for-profit businesses. There are exceptions for taxes (noted above) and some exceptions related to First Amendment concerns, noted below. Directors and officers of non-profits owe a fiduciary duty to the non-profit and its beneficiaries similar to the duties owed by directors and officers of for-profit corporations. Non-profits can have vicarious liability for injuries caused by their employees or volunteers to third parties, such as by traffic accidents. For this reason it is prudent for any non-profit to obtain liability insurance. Non-profits which have paid staff must comply with minimum wage laws, and with the requirement in most states to obtain workers compensation insurance.

Churches and religious non-profits are something of a special case, because the First Amendment to the U.S. Constitution forbids the government making a law "respecting an establishment of religion," and also forbids "prohibiting the free exercise thereof [that is, of religion]." The First Amendment originally bound only the U.S. Federal Government, but by incorporation through the 14th Amendment, also binds state and local governments. Under the Religious Freedom Restoration Act many generally applicable state laws regarding employment, zoning and the like are relaxed for churches.

Similarly, some non-profits, as private organizations, are not subject to the anti-discrimination laws which might apply to similar organizations serving the public for profit.

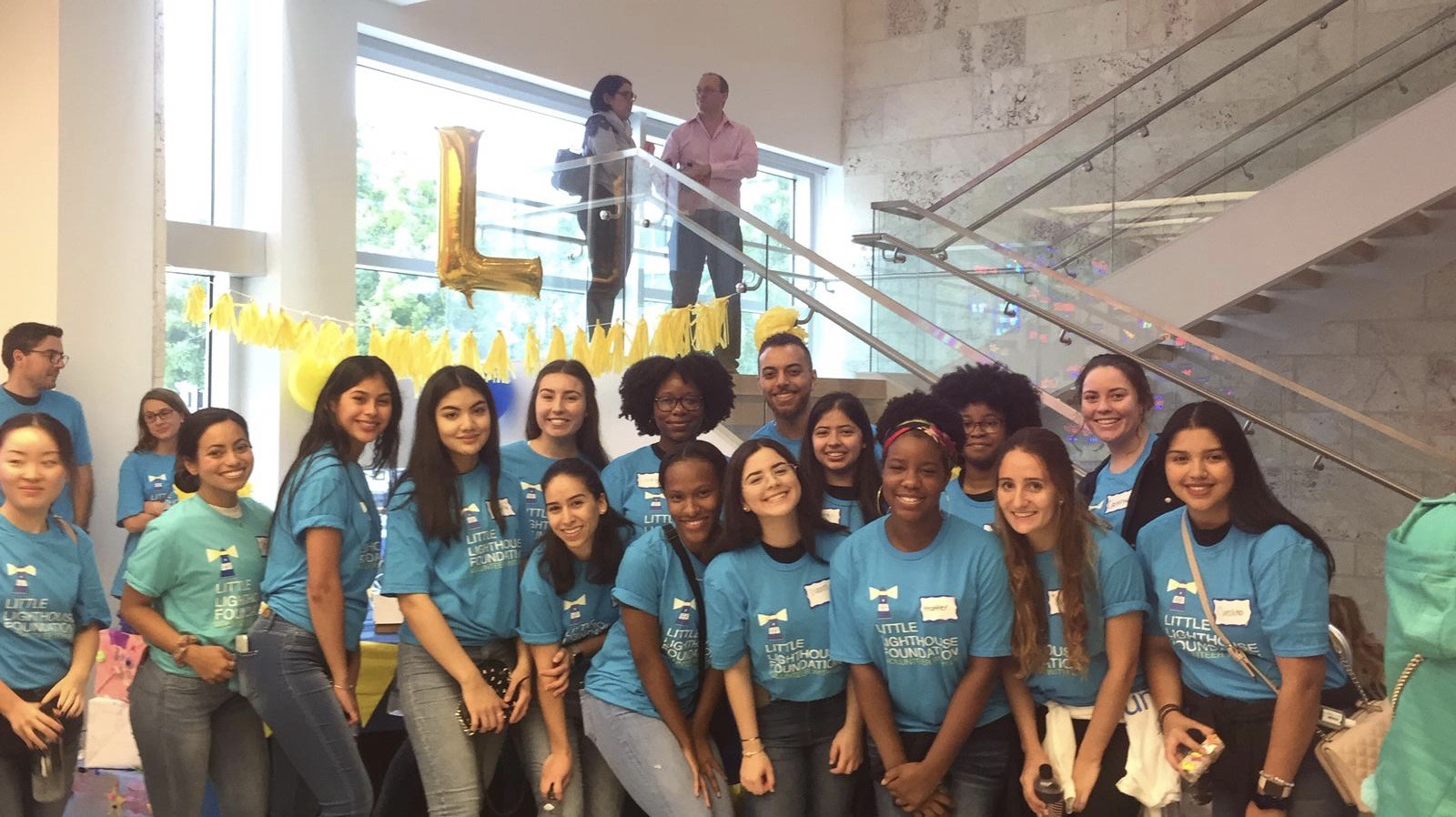
Little Light House Foundation

Charity non-profits face many of the same challenges of corporate governance which face large, publicly traded corporations. Fundamentally, the challenges arise from the "agency problem" - the fact that the management which controls the charity is necessarily different from the people who the charity is designed to benefit. In a non-profit corporation, the "agency problem" is even more difficult than in the for-profit sector, because the management of a non-profit is not even theoretically subject to removal by the charitable beneficiaries. The board of directors of most charities is self-perpetuating, with new members chosen by vote of the existing members.

== Business ethics in non-profits ==
Non-profit organizations are presented with the same complex challenges that would be found in any other business. The organizations must maintain an image, and they do this by managing stakeholder relationships to retaining donors, particularly during times of environmental change. This places a premium on knowing which stakeholders really matter if an effective relationship marketing strategy is to be developed, according to the Journal of Business Ethics.

Marketing strategies within non-profit organizations differ from commercial businesses. For example, non-profits will often pursue multiple, non-financial marketing objectives; they market for social change, which Liao et al. (2001) referred to as a ‘societal orientation’; and they garner more public attention, both positive and negative, than the average business (Shapiro, 1973). Thus, appealing more towards the public opinion.

There are two fundamental tasks which senior management teams address prior to articulating any new marketing strategy. These fundamental strategies are:

• Develop a rigorous approach to determining and agreeing on stakeholder saliencies across the organization.

• Auditing their current marketing practices across each of these stakeholders and assess their ability to produce the desired result.

== Charitable fraud prevention ==
In the United States, prevention of charitable fraud is mostly a function of state governments, and laws vary widely from state to state. Approximately 45 states have laws regulating charities and require registration before soliciting donations.

The Journal of Business Ethics reports that fraud losses affect not only small, local charities run by volunteers but also large, well-known charities with thousands of employees. Examples include $1.5 million of employee theft at Memorial Sloan-Kettering Cancer Center, $43 million of improper payments to grantees at The Global Fund, and a $26 million endowment write-off at New York University due to a fraudulent investment manager.

Many charities prefer to handle cases of fraud quietly because public disclosure can be costly. In addition to the direct cost of the diverted assets, disclosing a fraud may cause the charity to lose future donations or volunteers. Moreover, other charities and society at large can suffer from the spillover effects of diminished trust in the nonprofit sector as a whole (Bradley 2015).

== See also ==
- National Taxonomy of Exempt Entities (NTEE)
- Unionization in the nonprofit sector
