= Four Corners Generating Station =

American coal-fired power plant

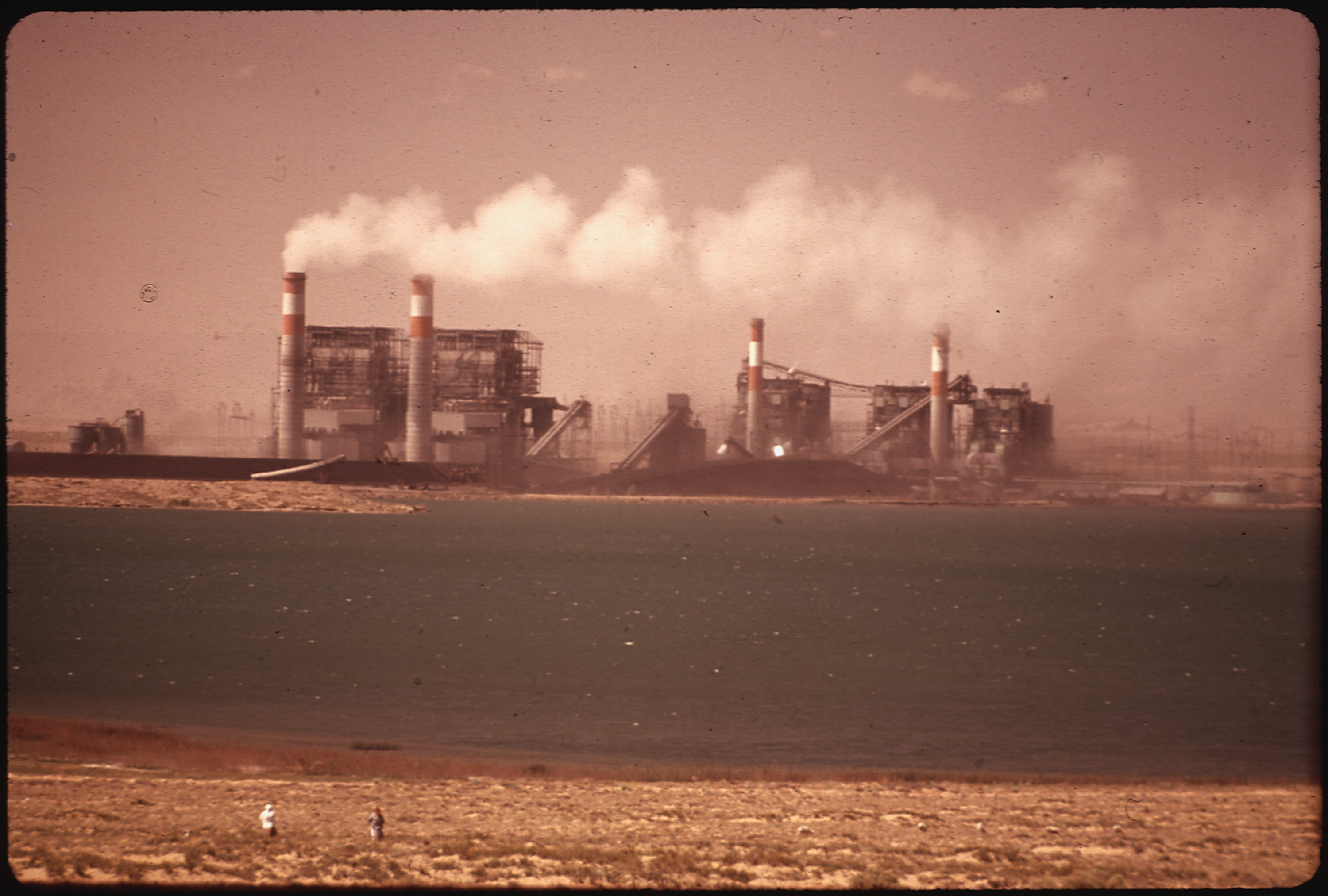
- Country: United States
- Location: Near Fruitland; Navajo Nation, New Mexico
- Coordinates: 36°41′17″N 108°28′37″W
- Status: Operational
- Commission date: Unit 1: 1963; Unit 2: 1963; Unit 3: 1964; Unit 4: 1969; Unit 5: 1970
- Decommission date: Unit 1: 2013; Unit 2: 2013; Unit 3: 2013; Unit 4: 2031 (planned); Unit 5: 2031 (planned)
- Owners: APS, 63%; PNM, 13%; SRP, 10%; TEP, 7%; NTEC, 7%

Thermal power station
- Primary fuel: Sub-bituminous coal

Power generation
- Nameplate capacity: 1,540 MW (was 2,040 MW)
- Annual net output: 7,509 (2018)

External links
- Commons: Related media on Commons

The Four Corners Generating Station is a 1,540 megawatt coal-fired power plant located near Fruitland, New Mexico, on property located on the Navajo Nation that is leased from the Navajo Nation government.

== Description ==
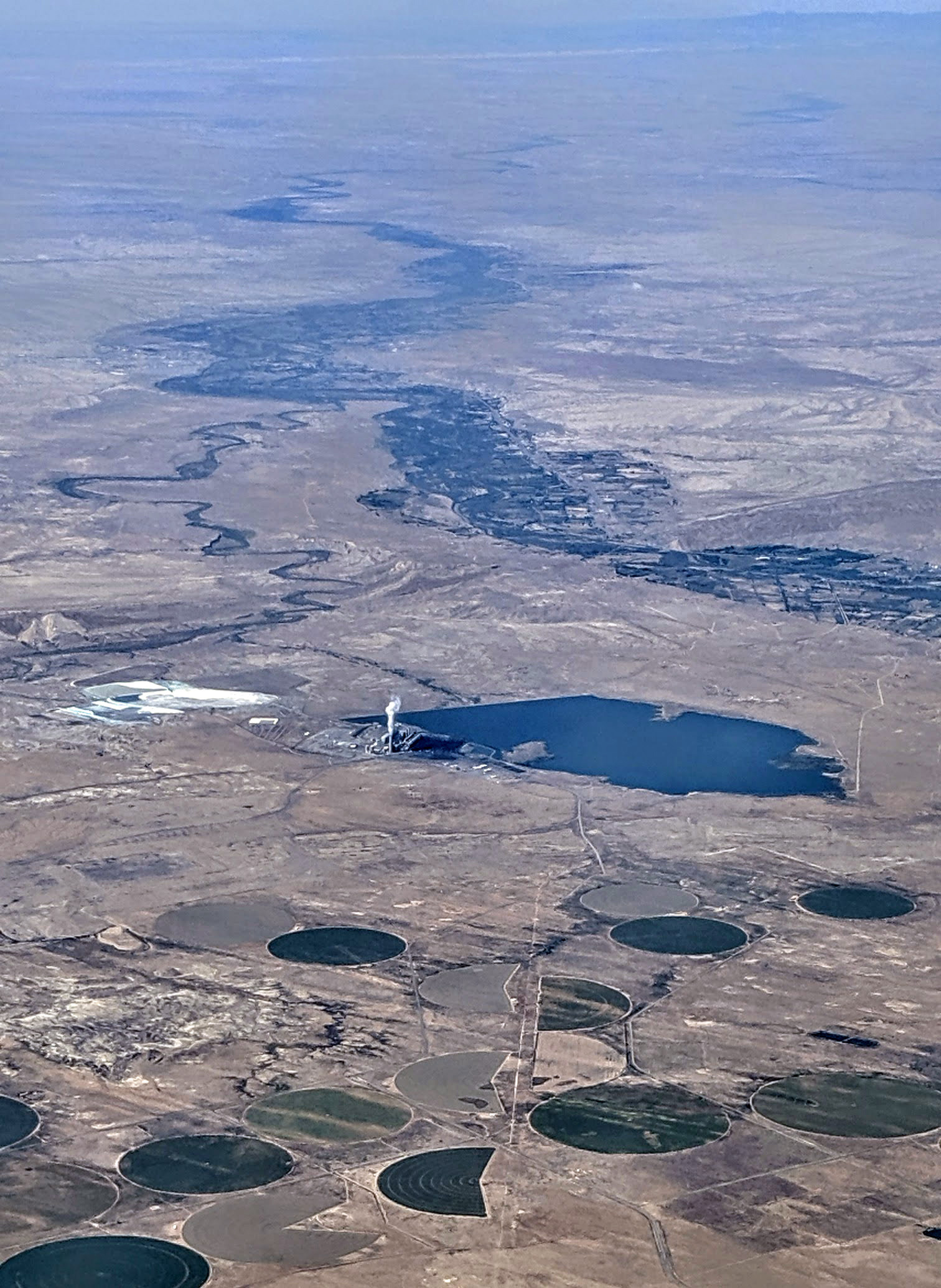
Four Corners Power Plant (by Morgan Lake) with Chaco River (left) San Juan River (right and background) confluence at Shiprock, New Mexico; aerial view looking west-northwest toward Four Corners.

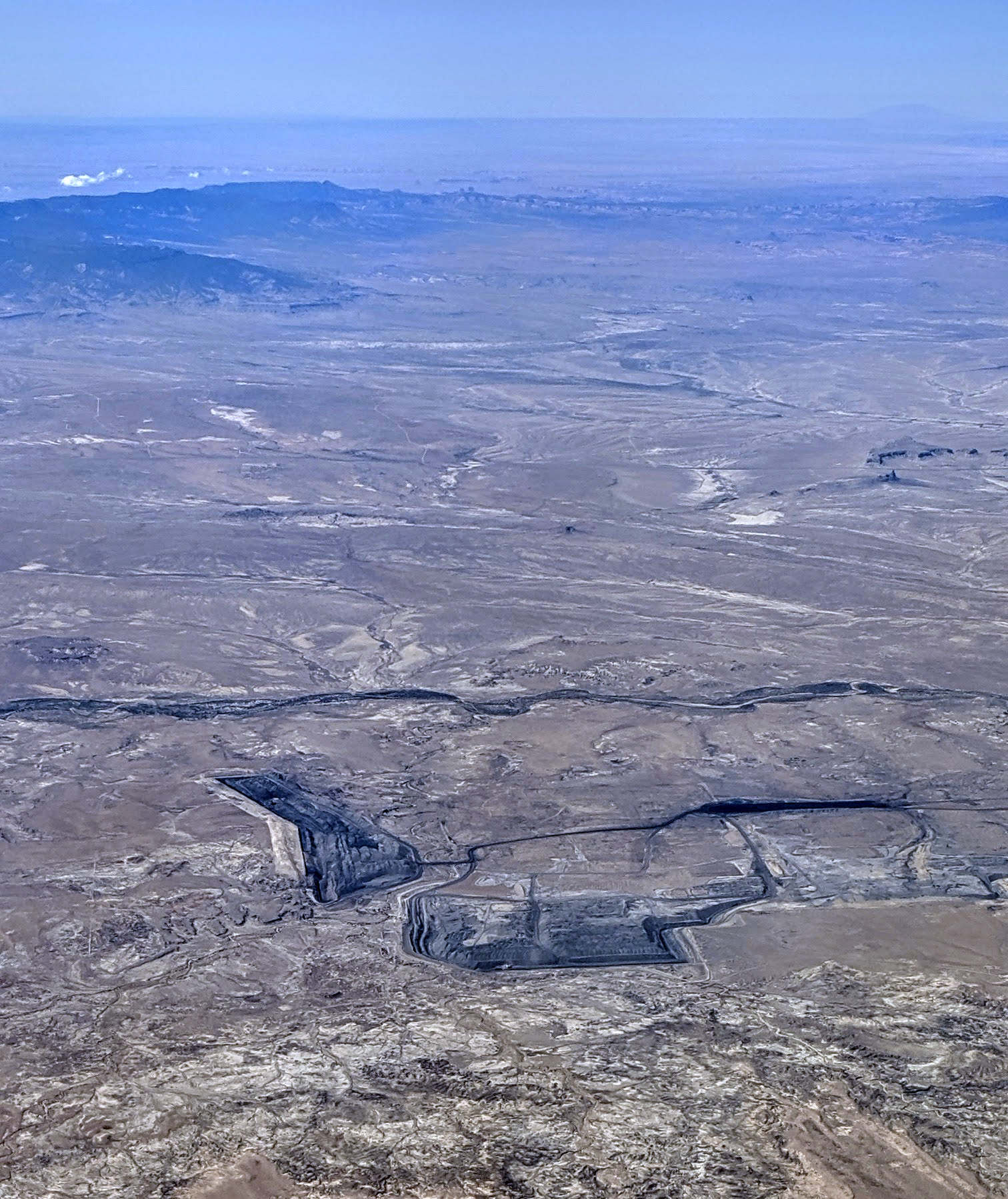
Aerial view of the Navajo Mine, about 12 miles south, which supplies coal to the Four Corners Generating Station

The Four Corners Generating Station originally consisted of five generating units with a total rated generating capacity of about 2,040 megawatts. Units 1, 2, and 3 (permanently shut down in 2014 as part of a $182 million plan for Arizona Public Service Co. to meet environmental regulations) had a combined generating capacity of 560 megawatts, while units 4 and 5 each have a generating capacity of 770 MW. Units 1, 2 and 3 opened in 1963–64 and units 4 and 5 opened in 1969–70.

The Arizona Public Service Company (APS) owned 100% of units 1, 2, and 3, while units 4 and 5 are operated by APS but owned jointly by APS and several other electric utilities. Originally, units 4 and 5 were owned by Southern California Edison Company (48%), APS (15%), Public Service Company of New Mexico (13%), Salt River Project (10%), Tucson Electric Power (7%), and El Paso Electric Company (7%). In 2013 Southern California Edison sold its 48% share to APS (and APS then immediately shut down units 1–3), and subsequently the El Paso Electric 7% share was acquired by Navajo Transitional Energy Company.

The station is cooled using water from Morgan Lake, which is man-made and is replenished by about 28 million gallons of water each day from the San Juan River. The plant burns sub-bituminous coal delivered from the nearby Navajo Coal Mine by the Navajo Mine Railroad.

The Navajo Transitional Energy Company (NTEC) bought the mine from BHP, three mines in Montana and Wyoming, and 7% of Four Corners Generating Station. In 2020, Arizona Public Service announced plans to decommission the Four Corners Generating Station, leaving no prospect for the mine and the railroad.

In APS's 2026 IRP, the Company is proposing extending the decommissioning date of the Four Corners Generating Station from 2031 to no later than 2038, stating that it is necessary for reliability and fuel diversity.

== History ==
The Four Corners Generating Station was constructed on property that was leased from the Navajo Nation in a renegotiated agreement that will expire in 2041. Unit 1 and unit 2 were completed in 1963, unit 3 was completed in 1964, unit 4 was completed in 1969, and unit 5 was completed in 1970.

Apparently the astronauts of the Mercury program reported that they could see two human-constructed things from space: one was the Great Wall of China and the other was the "plume streaming from Four Corners Power Plant."

In 1975, New Mexico enacted a tax on the generation of electricity and an in-state credit such that only electricity exported out-of-state was subject to the tax. Objections to this tax led to two United States Supreme Court cases. In Arizona v. New Mexico (1976), on a motion seeking to invoke the original jurisdiction of the Supreme Court, the court initially decided not to be involved and denied the motion, leaving the matter to the state court. The owners of Four Corners filed an action in state court to declare the tax invalid, leading to the United States Supreme Court decision Arizona Public Service Co. v. Snead (1979), which held that the tax violated the Supremacy Clause of the United States Constitution.

In November 2010, APS announced that it would purchase the SCE share of units 4 and 5, add air pollution control systems to these units, and shut down units 1, 2, and 3. This transaction and shutdown were completed in 2013. Following the shutdown of units 1 through 3, the capacity of Four Corners is 1,540 megawatts.

After a lawsuit by a coalition of environmental organizations, the plant owners and the plaintiffs reached a consent decree in 2015. According to the decree the plant will reduce emissions of nitrogen oxides and sulfur dioxide, pay $1.5 million in civil penalties and $6.7 million in healthcare and other mitigation costs for the people in the affected parts of the Navajo Nation. The lawsuit was based on pollution of Class I areas under the Clean Air Act in Grand Canyon National Park and 15 other areas of the National Park Service as well as hazardous conditions for health of neighbors of the plant.

=== Decommissioning ===
In January 2020, Arizona Public Service announced it would be decommissioning the Four Corners Generating Station by the end of 2031, seven years ahead of the originally scheduled closure date of 2038.

In October 2026, Arizona Public Service announced the operation of the four corners power plant would be extended beyond 2031.

== See also ==
- List of largest power stations in the United States
