= Private foundation (United States) =

Privately-endowed non-profit organization

Until 1969, the term private foundation was not defined in the United States Internal Revenue Code. Since then, every U.S. charity that qualifies under Section 501(c)(3) of the Internal Revenue Service Code as tax-exempt is a "private foundation" unless it demonstrates to the IRS that it falls into another category such as public charity. Unlike nonprofit corporations classified as a public charity, private foundations in the United States are subject to a 1.39% excise tax or endowment tax on any net investment income.

The US-based Foundation Center uses a more specific definition of private foundation which hinges in part on the existence of an endowment: a private foundation is a nongovernmental, nonprofit organization, which has a principal fund managed by its own trustees or directors. Hopkins (2013) listed four characteristics that make up a private foundation, also including an endowment as a condition for private foundations:

- It is a charitable organization and thus subject to the rules applicable to charities generally;
- Its financial support came from one source, usually an individual, family, or company;
- Its annual expenditures are funded out of earnings from an endowment or investment assets, rather than from an ongoing flow of contributions;
- It makes grants to other organizations for charitable purposes, rather than to its own programs.

== Structure ==
A private foundation is typically set up as a non-profit corporation that bears the name of its donors, but may alternatively be established as a trust. Donors specify the charitable purpose of the foundation (example: grants for cancer research, scholarships for the needy, support of religious goals). During their lifetime, they may continue their charitable giving by making tax deductible contributions to the foundation. The foundation may also be funded with a bequest from the donors' will or trust or receive funds as the primary or secondary beneficiary of a qualified plan or IRA.The IRS reports that there were 115,340 private foundations in the U.S. in 2008, of which 110,099 were grantmaking (non-operating) and 5,241 were operating foundations. Approximately 75% of the private foundations file annually with the IRS.

Once a foundation has been classified by the Internal Revenue Service as a private foundation, there are ways to describe it based on how the foundation is funded and governed. There are three types of private foundations: family foundations, private operating foundations, and corporate foundations.

=== Family foundation ===
Many private foundations are family foundations. Family foundation is not a legal term, and therefore, it has no precise definition. Yet, approximately two-thirds of the estimated 44,000 private foundations in the United States are believed to be family managed. This standard type of private foundation will provide grants directly to other charitable organizations that will use those funds to carry out the charitable activities or programs. Moody, Knap, Corra (2011) discuss the different definitions of family foundation that organizations and researchers used. They argue that because family foundation make up a large proportion of total foundations, it is essential to have a better clarity of the definition.

The Council on Foundations defines a family foundation as a "foundation whose funds are derived from members of a single family. At least one family member must continue to serve as an officer or board member of the foundation, they or their relatives play a significant role in governing and/or managing the foundation throughout its life. Most family foundations are run by family members who serve as trustees or directors on a voluntary basis, receiving no compensation; in many cases, second- and third-generation descendants of the original donors manage the foundation." The Rockefeller Foundation and the Gates Foundation are two of the most renowned and influential family foundations in the United States.

=== Private operating foundations ===
Private operating foundations are private foundations that use the bulk of their income to provide charitable services or to run charitable programs of their own. They make few, if any, grants to outside organizations. Thus, a private operating foundation sponsors and manages its own programs. A typical example of this would be a day camp for underprivileged children. Rather than providing grants to another organization to administer such a camp, which a standard private foundation would do, the private operating foundation will "operate" the camp. The private operating foundation will maintain a qualified staff as well as other personnel needed to carry out the program on a continuing basis. To qualify as a private operating foundation, specific rules, in addition to the applicable rules for private foundations, must be followed.

A private foundation qualifies as a private operating foundation by satisfying two numerical tests. These tests ensure that the private operating foundation is conducting its exempt activities directly and not simply making grants to other organizations. The first of the two tests is an income test, which requires a specific amount of income to be spent on direct charitable activities.

The second test is actually made up of three different tests: an asset test, an endowment test and a support test. However, the private operating foundation only has to satisfy one of these three tests, in addition to the income test, to qualify. Similar to the income test, these other three tests help to ensure that the private operating foundation is using its funds to meet the requirement of conducting direct charitable activities.

In contrast, a private foundation that principally provides grants to other entities or to individuals for charitable or other exempt purposes would not qualify as an operating foundation, and instead would be called a "nonoperating foundation". The Carnegie Endowment for International Peace and the Getty Trust are examples of operating foundations.

=== Corporate foundation ===
A corporate (company-sponsored) foundation is "a private foundation that derives its grant-making funds primarily from the contributions of a profit-making business. The company-sponsored foundation often maintains close ties with the donor company, but it is a separate, legal organization, sometimes with its own endowment, and is subject to the same rules and regulations as other private foundations."

According to the Foundation Center, corporate foundation giving grew to an estimated $5.2 billion in 2011, up 6 percent from 2010. Education (22%) and human services (20%) were the top funding priorities of corporate foundations in 2009, followed by public affairs/society benefit (19%), health (15%), arts and culture (14&), international affairs (4%), environment and animals (4%), and science and technology (2%). The table below includes the five largest corporate foundations ranked by total giving. All figures are based on the most current audited financial data in the Foundation Center's database as of November 16, 2014.

Rank	Name/(State)	Total Giving	Fiscal Year End Date
1	Novartis Patient Assistance Foundation, Inc. (NJ)	$452,745,445	12/31/2012
2	Sanofi Foundation for North America (NJ)	$284,044,399	12/31/2012
3	Wells Fargo Foundation(CA)	$186,775,875	12/31/2013
4	The Wal-Mart Foundation, Inc. (AR)	$182,859,236	01/31/2013
5	The Bank of America Charitable Foundation, Inc. (NC)	$175,299,789	12/31/2012

== Criticism and reform ==
The Tax Reform Act of 1969 created the private foundation in its current legal form and modern tax code establishes the legal framework for their operation and taxation. These restrictions came about as a reform effort to remedy perceived abuses of private foundations such as the claim that this type of charitable organization more likely served the private interests of the rich rather than the intended charitable purpose. Such criticism asserted that private individuals created private foundations as a vehicle to protect their assets from taxation; meanwhile the descendants may assert control over these assets almost in perpetuity.

In 2007 The Wall Street Journal reported that wealthy families are both increasing the number of foundations they close as well as increasing the number they establish. One trend is to put a time limit on the life of a foundation, under the assumption that heavy spending over a short period of time will do more good than slower spending over the long term. Some foundations are closed due to family disputes, concern about the effect of foundation wealth on descendants, and concern that future generations will not share the political beliefs that spurred the original establishment of the foundation. Sometimes one is closed, only to be reopened with a new purpose.

However, some scholars, such as, Silk and Lintott (2002) argue that even though private foundations offer a number of tax benefits, taxes are not a sufficient reason to create a private foundation. Given some charitable intent on the part of the founder, there are several substantial financial and personal benefits to creating a foundation. Using the Rockefeller Foundation and the Bill and Melinda Gates Foundation as examples, Eckl (2014) discusses the fact that private foundations have the power to shape global social and health policy. He argues that adding monetary resources and supplementary goodwill to existing global efforts is not the only goal of private foundations, rather it is still likely that they pursue a partisan agenda.

== See also ==
- Foundation (United States law)
- Private foundation
- Foundation (nonprofit)
- Financial endowment
- List of wealthiest charitable foundations
- Philanthropy
