= Arizona v. New Mexico =

- Supreme Court of the United States

Decided May 24, 1976
- Full case name: Arizona v. New Mexico
- Citations: 425 U.S. 794 (more) 96 S. Ct. 1845; 48 L. Ed. 2d 376; 1976 U.S. LEXIS 117

Case history
- Subsequent: Law upheld in state court sub nom.Arizona Public Service Co. v. O'Chesky, 91 N.M. 485, 576 P.2d 291 (1978); reversed sub nom Arizona Public Service Co. v. Snead, 441 U.S. 141 (1979)

Holding
- Motion denied as an action involving the same constitutional issues had been filed in state court which provided an appropriate forum to litigate the issues.

Court membership
- Chief Justice Warren E. Burger Associate Justices William J. Brennan Jr. · Potter Stewart; Byron White · Thurgood Marshall; Harry Blackmun · Lewis F. Powell Jr. William Rehnquist · John P. Stevens

Case opinions
- Per curiam
- Concurrence: Stevens

Laws applied
- U.S. Const., Article 3, Section 2

Arizona v. New Mexico, 425 U.S. 794 (1976), is an opinion from the United States Supreme Court which denied a motion from the State of Arizona seeking authorization to file suit against the State of New Mexico by invoking the original jurisdiction of the court.

== Background ==
Most of the electricity generated at the Four Corners Generating Station located in northwest New Mexico is transmitted for export and sold in neighboring states. In 1975 New Mexico enacted the Electrical Energy Tax Act, which imposed a tax on electricity generated by power plants within the state. The tax amounted to about 2 percent of the retail value of electricity. The Act further allowed electric companies in New Mexico to credit the amount of this tax against their existing tax liability from an existing 4 percent gross receipts tax on retail sales of electricity, essentially eliminating the effect of the tax upon New Mexico's in-state users of electricity. Electricity generated from in-state power plants but exported for sale to out-of-state customers did not have any gross receipts tax liability to credit the energy tax against.

Arizona filed a motion seeking to invoke the original jurisdiction of the Supreme Court under Article III Section 2 of the United States Constitution for authorization to file a complaint against New Mexico. Section 2 of Article III states that in cases in which a state is a party, the Supreme Court will have original jurisdiction, meaning that the trial will take place before the court. The complaint alleged that the New Mexico energy tax was invalid as it placed an unconstitutional burden on interstate commerce in violation of the Commerce Clause, denied Arizona due process and equal protection under the law under the Fourteenth Amendment, and abridged the privileges and immunities guarantied by Article IV, Section 2 of the Constitution.

New Mexico in its reply to the motion argued that the Court should deny the motion as the three Arizona electric companies had filed an action in the district court of Santa Fe County seeking a declaratory judgment that the energy tax was invalid, and that the companies had refused to pay the tax.

== Decision ==
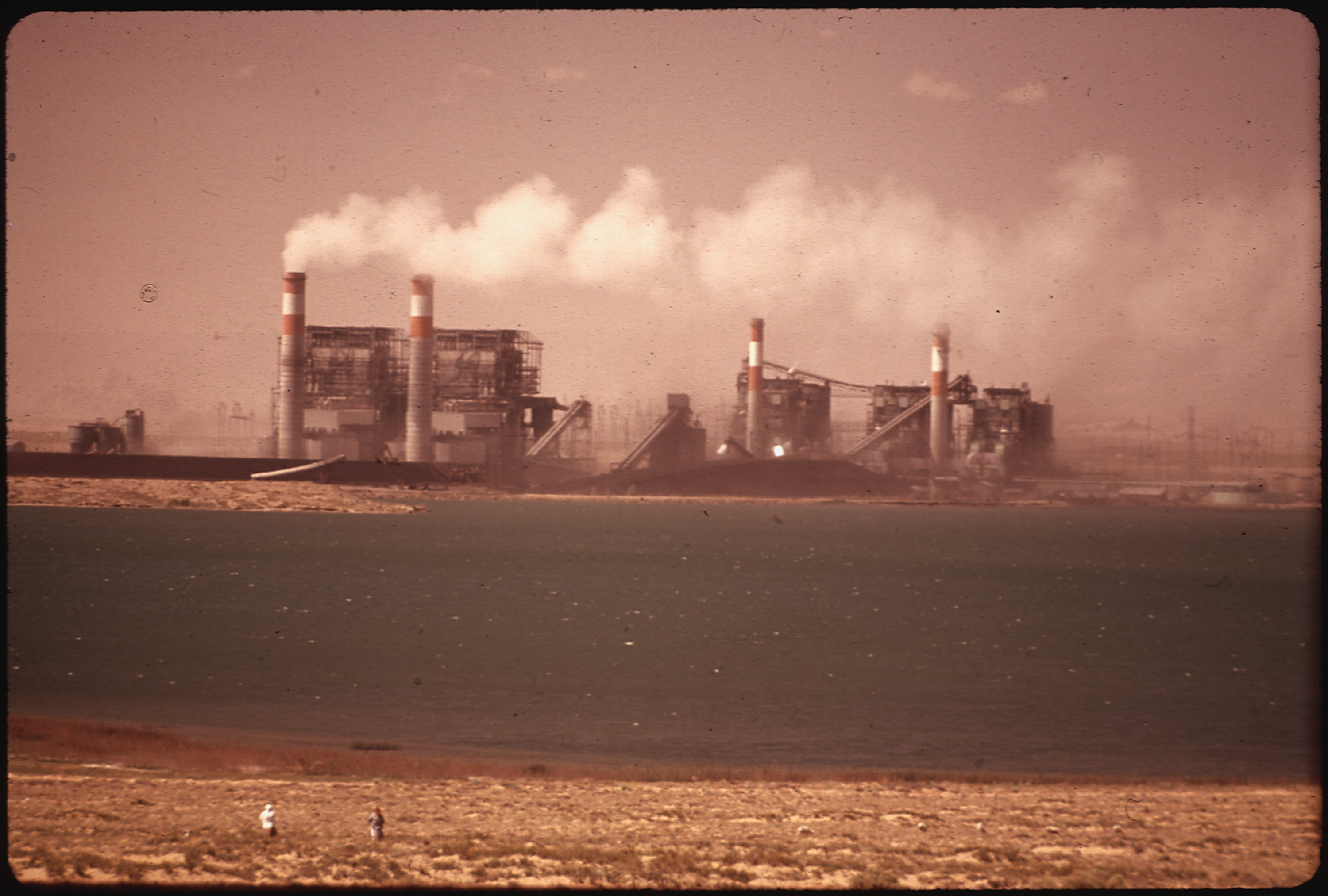
A New Mexico tax on electricity exported out-of-state from the Four Corners Generating Station, shown in a 1972 photograph, caused the dispute with Arizona.

The Supreme Court in a per curiam opinion denied the motion of Arizona. The opinion noted, based upon its decisions in Massachusetts v. Missouri, 308 U.S. 1 (1939), and Illinois v. City of Milwaukee, 406 U.S. 91 (1972), that the original jurisdiction of the Supreme Court was to be used only in appropriate cases based upon the seriousness of the case and whether another forum was available with jurisdiction over the parties and where the issues could be litigated. By using its discretion and limiting the instances where original jurisdiction was granted, the Court could devote its time and resources to its appellate cases. In this case, the Court concluded that the pending state court case was the appropriate forum for litigation of the same issues involving the New Mexico energy tax.

Justice Stevens filed a concurring opinion noting that the complaint of Arizona failed to allege that the New Mexico tax affects the electric rates paid by Arizona consumers, and that Arizona was not sufficiently affected by the tax to justify the original jurisdiction of the court. Because the Arizona electric companies, including the Salt River Project, which is a unit of the Arizona state government, had access to a state court to litigate the issue, Stevens concurred in the judgment.

== Subsequent developments ==
The case that the three electric companies had filed in state court eventually was appealed to the Supreme Court. In Arizona Public Service Co. v. Snead, 441 U.S. 141 (1979), the Court held that the New Mexico energy tax was invalid under the Supremacy Clause of the Constitution in light of a federal statute prohibiting such a tax. The federal statute had been enacted specifically to prohibit state electric generation and transmission taxes, such as the New Mexico energy tax, that discriminate against interstate commerce.
