= Revenue Act of 1934 =

The Revenue Act of 1934 (May 10, 1934, ch. 277, 48 Stat. 680) raised United States individual income tax rates marginally on higher incomes. The top individual income tax rate remained at 63 percent.

It was signed into law by President Franklin D. Roosevelt.

== Tax on Corporations ==
A rate of 13.75 percent was levied on the net income of corporations.

== Tax on Individuals ==
A Normal Tax and a Surtax were levied against the net income of individuals as shown in the following table.

Revenue Act of 1934; Normal Tax and Surtax on Individuals 48 Stat. 684
Net Income (dollars)	Normal Rate (percent)	Surtax Rate (percent)	Combined Rate (percent)
0	4	0	4
4,000	4	4	8
6,000	4	5	9
8,000	4	6	10
10,000	4	7	11
12,000	4	8	12
14,000	4	9	13
16,000	4	11	15
18,000	4	13	17
20,000	4	15	19
22,000	4	17	21
26,000	4	19	23
32,000	4	21	25
38,000	4	24	28
44,000	4	27	31
50,000	4	30	34
56,000	4	33	37
62,000	4	36	40
68,000	4	39	43
74,000	4	42	46
80,000	4	45	49
90,000	4	50	54
100,000	4	52	56
150,000	4	53	57
200,000	4	54	58
300,000	4	55	59
400,000	4	56	60
500,000	4	57	61
750,000	4	58	62
1,000,000	4	59	63

- Exemption of $1,000 for single filers and $2,500 for married couples and heads of family. A $400 exemption for each dependent under 18.
