= Intermediate sanctions =

Designation by the U.S. Internal Revenue Service

Intermediate sanctions is a term used in regulations enacted by the United States Internal Revenue Service that is applied to certain types of non-profit organizations who engage in transactions that inure to the benefit of a disqualified person within the organization. These regulations allow the IRS to penalize the organization and the disqualified person receiving the benefit. Intermediate sanctions may be imposed either in addition to or instead of revocation of the exempt status of the organization.

== Summary ==
The Taxpayer Bill of Rights 2 which came into force on July 30, 1996, added section 4958 to the Internal Revenue Code. Section 4958 adds intermediate sanctions as an alternative to revocation of the exempt status of an organization when private persons benefit from transactions with a 501(c)(3) public charity or 501(c)(4) non-profit organization. NOTE: 501(c)(3) private foundations are subject to similar regulations found in Section 4941 of the Internal Revenue Code.

Intermediate Sanctions may be imposed on any disqualified person who receives an excess benefit from a covered non-profit organization and on each organization manager who approves an excess benefit. If you are a disqualified person you are subject to having participated in an excess benefit transaction, if the transaction is so defined.

Being a disqualified person does not automatically result in a finding that a transaction involves an excess benefit. If you are not a disqualified person, then you cannot be subject to an excess benefit (your transaction with the non-profit organization is considered to be at arm's length).

If there is a finding that there has been an excess benefit, the disqualified person must reimburse the organization to place the organization back in the position it was in before the excess benefit transaction was completed. As well, there are stiff interest penalties and excise penalties in excess of 200%. The organizational managers who participated in the transaction may also be fined an aggregate of $10,000 per violation and are jointly and severally liable for payment of such penalty. These penalties are cumulative, thus an individual may be liable as a disqualified person and as an organization manager.

== History ==
The Taxpayer Bill of Rights 2 (effective July 30, 1996) added section 4958 to the Internal Revenue Code. On August 4, 1998, the IRS proposed regulations to implement IRC 4958. On March 16 and 17, 1999, the IRS held public hearings on these proposed regulations. It was not until January 10, 2001, that the IRS issued Temporary Regulations, which were to be effective for up to 3 years. Then, on January 23, 2002, the Final Regulations were issued, superseding the Temporary Regulations.

On September 9, 2005, the IRS announced proposed rulemaking to clarify the relationship between penalties imposed under section 4958 and revocation of exempt status.

== Who is a Disqualified Person? ==
You are a disqualified person if you are a person who, during five years beginning after September 13, 1995, and ending on the date of the transaction in question, were in a position to exercise substantial influence over the affairs of the exempt organization. Note: You can be an individual, another organization, a partnership or unincorporated association, trust or estate.

In affiliated organizations, your substantial influence must be determined separately for each organization but benefits provided by a controlled entity will be treated as being provided by the exempt organization. A person may be a disqualified person for more than one organization.

The intermediate sanction statute identifies certain persons as having substantial influence as a matter of law — such persons are conclusively presumed to be disqualified persons. The temporary regulations identify additional categories of those who have a substantial influence. The IRS considers these individuals to be presumptively disqualified.

Under the statute, the following are disqualified:

- A family member (spouse, siblings and their spouses, ancestors, children, grandchildren, great-grandchildren, and spouses of children, grandchildren and great-grandchildren) of a disqualified person. A legally adopted child is a child.
- An organization (corporation, partnership, trust or estate) owned 35% or more, directly or indirectly, by a disqualified person, or family member(s). This does not include voting rights held only as a director, trustee, or other fiduciary, without any stock, profit or other beneficial interest.

Other persons defined by the regulations as having substantial interest include:

- Members of the governing board of the organization who are entitled to vote on matters over which the governing body has authority (e.g., directors, elders, trustees, steering committee members, etc.).
- Executive officers of the organization, such as president, chief executive officer, and chief operating officer — the exact title is used is irrelevant; includes any individual who has ultimate responsibility for implementing board decisions or for supervising the management, administration or operations of the organization. Responsibilities may be shared by more than one individual. If a person has a title of president, chief executive officer or chief operating officer that person will be disqualified unless they can show otherwise.
- The treasurer or chief financial officer — including anyone who has or shares responsibility for managing the organization's financial assets, regardless of actual title. Several persons may share this responsibility. Once again, any person with the title of treasurer or chief financial officer will be considered to have this ultimate responsibility unless shown otherwise.
- If a hospital participates in a provider-sponsored organization then any person who has a material financial interest in the organization (e.g., a person involved in a joint venture with the organization).

== Not a Disqualified Person ==
Under the temporary regulations certain persons are deemed not to have substantial influence including:

- 501(c)(3) organizations.
- With respect to a 501(c)(4) organization, another organization described in 501(c)(4).
- Employees who do not fit into one of the categories listed above, provided they are not highly compensated employees (as defined in section 414(q)(1)(B)(i) - compensation in excess of $80,000, as adjusted by the IRS) or substantial contributors (as defined in section 507(d)(2)(A), taking into account only contributions received during the current and the four preceding taxable years).

Facts and Circumstances Test

Whether an individual or organization is a disqualified person in any cases not under the above categories is determined by a facts and circumstances test. The regulations include two lists of facts and circumstances (1) including facts and circumstances that tend to show an individual has substantial influence and (2) including facts and circumstances that tend to show a person 'does not have substantial influence.

(1). Facts and circumstances which tend to show a person has substantial influence include:

1. The person founded the organization.
2. The person is a substantial contributor to the organization (as defined in section 507(d)(2)(A), taking into account only contributions received during the current taxable year and the four preceding taxable years).
3. The person's compensation is primarily based on revenues derived from an activity of the organization or a part thereof that the person controls (see further discussion about percentage payments, below).
4. The person has or shares authority to control or determine a substantial portion of the organization's capital expenditures, operating budget, or compensation for employees.
5. The person manages a discrete segment or activity of the organization that represents a substantial portion of the organization's activities, assets, income or expenses, as compared to the organization as a whole. For example, a person who manages one department that contributes significantly to the whole may be a disqualified person.
6. The person owns a controlling interest (measured either by vote or value) in an organization (corporation, partnership, trust) that is a disqualified person.
7. The person is a non-stock organization (such as a social club, homeowners association, etc.) controlled, directly or indirectly, by one or more disqualified persons.

(2). Facts and circumstances which tend to show a person has no substantial influence include:

1. The organization is a religious organization and the person has taken a "bona fide" vow of poverty as an employee or agent, or on behalf of the organization.
2. The person is a contractor (e.g. an attorney, an accountant, or investment manager or advisor) whose sole relationship to the organization is providing professional advice (without having decision-making authority) with respect to transactions from which the contractor will not economically benefit, either directly or indirectly, apart from customary fees received for the professional advice rendered.
3. The direct supervisor of the individual is not a disqualified person.
4. The person does not participate in any management decisions affecting the organization as a whole or a discrete segment or activity of the organization that represents a substantial portion of the organization's activities, assets, income or expenses, as compared to the organization as a whole.
5. Any preferential treatment a person receives which is based on the size of the person's donation, is also offered to all other donors making a comparable contribution as part of a solicitation intended to attract a substantial number of contributions.

== Who is an Organization Manager? ==
An organization manager is any officer, director, trustee, or person having similar powers or responsibilities, regardless of title. Officers are specifically designated under the articles or bylaws of the organization, or a person regularly exercising general authority to make administrative or policy decisions for the organization. If a person only makes recommendations, but cannot implement decisions without approval of a superior, that person is not an officer. The regulations make it clear that a contractor who acts solely in a capacity as an attorney, accountant, or investment manager or advisor is not an officer.

An organization manager includes anyone on a committee of the board (whether a member of the board), if the organization is claiming that the rebuttable presumption of reasonableness (see below) is based on the committee's (or the designee's) actions. If the committee is responsible for determining the reasonableness of a transaction, and this determination is relied upon by the organization, every member of the committee will be considered an organization manager.

When Does an Organization Manager Participate in a Transaction?

Silence or inaction can be participation by the organization manager if the manager is under a duty to speak or act, as well as any affirmative action. Abstention is considered consent to a transaction. Managers opposing the transaction in a manner consistent with their responsibilities to the organization are not be considered to have participated in the action.

Knowing Participation — Knowing means that the manager:

- has actual knowledge of sufficient facts which indicate, based solely on those facts, the transaction is an excess benefit transaction,
- is aware that the transaction may violate the law, and
- negligently fails to make reasonable attempts to ascertain whether the transaction is an excess benefit transaction or is, in fact, aware that it is such a transaction.

Although knowing does not mean having reason to know, under the regulations, evidence that a manager has reason to know is relevant to determine whether the manager has actual knowledge. It is up to the IRS to prove that the manager knowingly participated.

If an organization manager relies on a reasoned written opinion of an appropriate professional, his or her participation will ordinarily not be considered knowing. In addition, an organization manager's participation is ordinarily not considered knowing if the requirements of the rebuttable presumption of reasonableness are satisfied.

Willful Participation — an organization manager participation is willful if it is voluntary, conscious and intentional. It is not willful if the manager does not know that the transaction is an excess benefit transaction.

Due to Reasonable Cause — if the manager exercised responsibility on behalf of the organization with ordinary business care and prudence participation is due to reasonable cause.

== Safe Harbor Provision of the Law ==
Congress, in the legislative history, intended to create a rebuttable presumption of reasonableness, or safe harbor. Under this safe harbor, compensation is presumed to be reasonable and a property transfer is presumed to be at fair market value if: (1) the compensation arrangement or terms of transfer are approved, in advance, by an authorized body of the exempt organization, composed entirely of individuals without a conflict of interest, (2) the board or committee obtained and relied upon appropriate data as to comparability in making its determination; and (3) the board or committee adequately documented the basis for its determination, concurrently with making the decision.

The disqualified person or organization manager has the initial burden of proving that the compensation was reasonable. If the three criteria above are met, the burden of proof shifts to the IRS and the IRS must prove that the compensation was unreasonable. The IRS can rebut the presumption with sufficient contrary evidence showing the compensation was not reasonable or showing a transfer not to be at fair market value.

== Penalties ==
The intermediate sanction provision goes on to create a penalty which is essentially a claw back of any benefits received plus a penalty as well as excise penalties that may be in excess of 200% of the benefit received. The organization must be returned to the state it was in, to the extent possible, before the person received the excess benefit. While the contract may be modified to prevent any excess benefit once any penalties are paid, organization managers may be liable for penalties up to $10,000 and held jointly and severally liable.

In order to prevent the IRS's invocation of intermediate sanctions, any individual serving on the governing body of the organization may not have a conflict of interest regarding the transaction, and if they are on the governing body and have a conflict, they may answer questions posed by other members, but they must recuse themselves in the decision-making process, including debate.
