= Private foundation =

Type of charitable organization

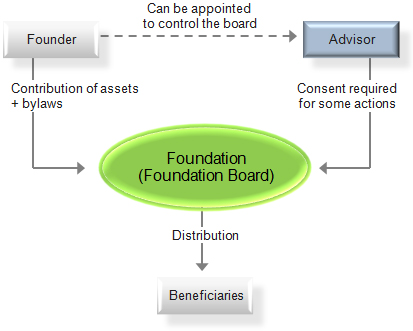
- Chart of a foundation
- Type: Charitable organization

A private foundation is a tax-exempt organization that does not rely on broad public support and is typically set up to serve humanitarian purposes.

Unlike a charitable foundation, a private foundation generally does not solicit funds from the public or have the legal requirements and reporting responsibilities of a registered non-profit or charitable foundation. Not all foundations engage in philanthropy; some private foundations are used for estate planning purposes.

== Common law ==
The following foundations are set up under common law legal systems:

=== Canada ===
In Canada, the Canada Revenue Agency is a branch of the Canadian government that regulates all foundations. Under Canadian law, since 1967, a private foundation is controlled by a single donor or family through a board that is made up of a majority (more than 50%) of directors at non-arm's-length. It is a legally registered charity with the Canada Revenue Agency. A public foundation is governed by a board composed of a majority of directors at arm's length. A private foundation is not allowed to engage in any business activity, but it can operate its own charitable program.

The Canada Revenue Agency designates the application as a "charitable organization", a "public foundation", or a "private foundation", depending on its structure, sources of funding, and operations. The Income Tax Act requirements are different, depending on the type of charity (Income Tax Act, R.S.C. 1985 (5th supp.) c. 1, para. 149.1(4)(a)).

=== The Bahamas ===
Foundations were first introduced in The Bahamas in December 2004, following the Foundations Act.

=== United States ===
A private foundation, in the United States, is a charitable organization described in the Internal Revenue Code by section 509. A private foundation is necessarily a 501(c)(3) exempt organization (or a former such entity). It is defined by a negative definition: by what it is not. A private foundation is not a public charity, as described in section 170(b)(1)(A) (i) through (vi). Neither is it a section 509(a)(2) organization, nor a supporting organization. Private foundations are subject to 1.39% excise taxes found in section 4940 through 4945 of the Internal Revenue Code. Once a charity becomes a private foundation, it retains that status unless it follows the difficult termination rules of section 507.

Every organization that qualifies for tax exemption as an organization described in section 501(c)(3) is a private foundation unless it falls into one of the categories specifically excluded from the definition of that term (referred to in section 509(a)). In addition, certain nonexempt charitable trusts are also treated as private foundations. Organizations that fall into the excluded categories include institutions such as hospitals or universities, and those that generally have broad public support or actively function in a supporting relationship to such organizations.

In the United States, there are several restrictions and requirements on private foundations, including:

1. restrictions on self-dealing between private foundations and their substantial contributors and other disqualified persons;
2. requirements that the foundation annually distribute income for charitable purposes;
3. limits on their holdings in private businesses;
4. provisions that investments must not jeopardize the carrying out of exempt purposes; and
5. provisions to assure that expenditures further exempt purposes. Violations of these provisions give rise to taxes and penalties against the private foundation and, in some cases, its managers, its substantial contributors, and certain related persons.

The Gates Foundation is the largest private foundation in the U.S., with over $38 billion in assets. Most private foundations are much smaller. Out of the 84,000 private foundations that filed with the IRS in 2008, approximately 66% have less than $1 million in assets, and 93% have less than $10 million in assets. In aggregate, private foundations in the U.S. control over $628 billion in assets and made more than $44 billion in charitable contributions in 2007.

== Civil law ==
The following foundations are set up under civil law legal systems:

=== Austria ===
The Austrian Private Foundation (Privatstiftung) was last reformed under the Private Foundation Act in September 1993. The Austrian private foundation is considered a legal person having beneficiaries rather than shareholders or proprietors and may be established for any purpose. There are three levels of taxation related to Austrian private foundations: taxation of asset transfers, ongoing taxation of the private foundation's income, and taxation of distributions from the private foundation to beneficiaries.

=== Liechtenstein ===
The Liechtenstein Family Foundation (Stiftung) was first introduced in 1926 and updated by the Act Reforming the Persons and Companies Act in 2008, which included a new Act on Foundations. They are allowed to pursue non-commercial and/or private benefit purposes. A private benefit family foundation is tax-exempt.

=== Mauritius ===
The Mauritius Foundation was introduced following 'The Foundations Act' of 2012. Such entities are tax-exempt as long as the founder and beneficiaries are non-residents of Mauritius.

=== Netherlands ===
A foundation in the Netherlands (Stichting) is a legal person created through a legal act. This act is usually either a notarised deed (or a will) that contains the articles of the foundation, which must include the first appointed board.

=== Netherlands Antilles ===
Foundation legislation was last reformed in 1998, giving rise to the Netherlands Antilles Private Foundation (Stichting Particulier Fonds).

=== Nevis ===
The Nevis Multiform Foundation was introduced in 2005.

=== Panama ===
The Panama Private Interest Foundation was introduced following the Law 25, June 12, 1995.

=== Poland ===
The Poland Family Foundation was introduced in 2023.

=== Saint Kitts ===
The Saint Kitts Foundation was introduced following the Foundation Act of 2003.

=== Seychelles ===
The Seychelles Foundation was introduced following the Foundation Act of 2009.

=== Sweden ===
A private foundation in Sweden (Stiftelse) is formed by a letter of donation from a founder donating funds or assets to be administered for a specific purpose. A private foundation may have diverse purposes, including collective, familiar, or the purpose of passive administration of funds. Normally, the supervision of a private foundation is done by the county government where the foundation has its domicile, however, large foundations must be registered by the County Administrative Board (CAB), which must also supervise the administration of the foundation. The main legal instruments governing private foundations in Sweden are those that regulate foundations in general: the Foundation Act (1994:1220) and the Regulation for Foundations (1995:1280).

== See also ==
- Benefit corporation
- Charitable organization
- Foundation (nonprofit organization)
- Institute
- Stichting
- Waqf
