= 501(c)(3) organization =

US nonprofit exempt from federal income tax

A 501(c)(3) organization is a United States corporation, trust, unincorporated association, or other type of organization exempt from federal income tax under section 501(c)(3) of Title 26 of the United States Code. It is one of the 29 types of 501(c) nonprofit organizations in the U.S.

501(c)(3) tax-exemptions apply to entities that are organized and operated exclusively for religious, charitable, scientific, literary or educational purposes, or for testing for public safety, to foster national or international amateur sports competition, or for the prevention of cruelty to children or animals. The 501(c)(3) exemption applies also for any non-incorporated community chest, fund, cooperating association or foundation organized and operated exclusively for those purposes. There are also supporting organizations—often referred to in shorthand form as Friends of organizations.

26 U.S.C. § 170 provides a deduction for federal income tax purposes, for some donors who make charitable contributions to most types of 501(c)(3) organizations, among others. Regulations specify which such deductions must be verifiable to be allowed (e.g., receipts for donations of $250 or more).

Due to the tax deductions associated with donations, loss of 501(c)(3) status can be highly challenging if not fatal to a charity's continued operation, as many foundations and corporate matching funds do not grant funds to a charity without such status, and individual donors often do not donate to such a charity due to the unavailability of tax deduction for contributions.

== Types ==
The two exempt classifications of 501(c)(3) organizations are as follows:

- A public charity, identified by the Internal Revenue Service (IRS) as "not a private foundation", normally receives a substantial part of its income, directly or indirectly, from the general public or from the government. The public support must be fairly broad, not limited to a few individuals or families. Public charities are defined in the Internal Revenue Code under sections 509(a)(0) through 509(a)(4).
- A private foundation, sometimes called a non-operating foundation, receives most of its income from investments and endowments. This income is used to make grants to other organizations, rather than being disbursed directly for charitable activities. Private foundations are defined in the Internal Revenue Code under section 509(a) as 501(c)(3) organizations, which do not qualify as public charities.

== Obtaining status ==
The basic requirement of obtaining tax-exempt status is that the organization is specifically limited in powers to purposes that the IRS classifies as tax-exempt purposes. Unlike for-profit corporations that benefit from broad and general purposes, non-profit organizations need to be limited in powers to function with tax-exempt status, but a non-profit corporation is by default not limited in powers until specifically limiting itself in the articles of incorporation or nonprofit corporate bylaws. This limiting of the powers is crucial to obtaining tax exempt status with the IRS and then on the state level. Organizations acquire 501(c)(3) tax exemption by filing IRS Form 1023. As of 2006, the form must be accompanied by an $850 filing fee if the yearly gross receipts for the organization are expected to average $10,000 or more. If yearly gross receipts are expected to average less than $10,000, the filing fee is reduced to $400. There are some classes of organizations that automatically are treated as tax exempt under 501(c)(3), without the need to file Form 1023: Grantmakers and foundations typically require a copy of the official IRS Determination Letter, rather than just an EIN, to verify an organization's tax-exempt status before disbursing funds.

- Churches, their integrated auxiliaries, and conventions or associations of churches. A convention or association of churches generally refers to the organizational structure of congregational churches. A convention or association of churches can also refer to a cooperative undertaking of churches of various denominations that works together to perform religious activities.
- Organizations that are not private foundations and that have gross receipts that normally are not more than $5,000

The IRS released a software tool called Cyber Assistant in 2013, which was succeeded by Form 1023-EZ in 2014.

There is an alternative way for an organization to obtain status if an organization has applied for a determination and either there is an actual controversy regarding a determination or the Internal Revenue Service has failed to make a determination. In these cases, the United States Tax Court, the United States District Court for the District of Columbia, and the United States Court of Federal Claims have concurrent jurisdiction to issue a declaratory judgment of the organization's qualification if the organization has exhausted administrative remedies with the Internal Revenue Service.

Prior to December 30, 1969, nonprofit organizations could declare themselves to be tax-exempt under Section 501(c)(3) without first obtaining Internal Revenue Service recognition by filing Form 1023 and receiving a determination letter. A nonprofit organization that did so prior to that date could still be subject to challenge of its status by the Internal Revenue Service.

== Tax-deductible charitable contributions ==
Individuals may take a tax deduction on a charitable gift to a 501(c)(3) organization that is organized and operated exclusively for religious, charitable, scientific, literary or educational purposes, or to foster national or international amateur sports competition (but only if no part of its activities involve the provision of athletic facilities or equipment), or for the prevention of cruelty to children or animals.

An individual may not take a tax deduction on gifts made to a 501(c)(3) organization that is organized and operated exclusively for the testing for public safety.

In the case of tuition fees paid to a private 501(c)(3) school or a church school, the payments are not tax-deductible charitable contributions because they are payments for services rendered to the payee or the payee's children. The payments are not tax-deductible charitable contributions even if a significant portion of a church school's curriculum is religious education. For a payment to be a tax-deductible charitable contribution, it must be a voluntary transfer of money or other property with no expectation of procuring financial benefit equal to the transfer amount.

Before donating to a 501(c)(3) organization, a donor can consult the searchable online IRS list of charitable organizations to verify that the organization qualifies to receive tax-deductible charitable contributions.

Consumers may file IRS Form 13909, with documentation, to complain about inappropriate or fraudulent (i.e., fundraising, political campaigning, lobbying) activities by any 501(c)(3) organization.

Most 501(c)(3) must disclose the names and addresses of certain large donors to the Internal Revenue Service on their annual returns, but this information is not required to be made available to the public, unless the organization is an independent foundation. Churches are generally exempt from this reporting requirement.

== Transparency ==
Every 501(c)(3) organization must make available for public inspection its application for tax-exemption, including its Form 1023 or Form 1023-EZ and any attachments, supporting documents, and follow-up correspondence with the Internal Revenue Service. The same public inspection requirement applies to the organization's annual return, namely its Form 990, Form 990-EZ, Form 990-PF, Form 990-T, and Form 1065, including any attachments, supporting documents, and follow-up correspondence with the Internal Revenue Service, with the exception of the names and addresses of donors on Schedule B. Annual returns must be publicly available for a three-year period beginning with the due date of the return, including any extension of time for filing.

Churches and religious organizations, however, are not required to file Form 990.

The Internal Revenue Service provides information about specific 501(c)(3) organizations through its Tax Exempt Organization Search online. A private nonprofit organization, GuideStar, provides information on 501(c)(3) organizations. ProPublica's Nonprofit Explorer provides copies of each organization's Form 990 and, for some organizations, audited financial statements. WikiCharities, is a nonprofit database of nonprofits and charities by name, location, and topic, that allows each organization to report its financials, leadership, contacts, and other activities. However, Open990 was a searchable database of information about organizations that had to shut down due to IRS delays in posting information online.

== Limitations on political activity ==
Section 501(c)(3) organizations are prohibited from supporting political candidates, as a result of the Johnson Amendment enacted in 1954. Section 501(c)(3) organizations are subject to limits on lobbying, having a choice between two sets of rules establishing an upper bound for their lobbying activities. Section 501(c)(3) organizations risk loss of their tax-exempt status if these rules are violated.

An organization that loses its 501(c)(3) status due to being engaged in political activities cannot subsequently qualify for 501(c)(3) status. As a result, it is common for 501(c)(3) organizations to have affiliated nonprofits that are classified as 501(c)(4) organizations, allowing the affiliate to engage in political activity without threatening 501(c)(3) status.

== Churches and religious organizations ==
Churches must meet specific requirements to obtain and maintain tax-exempt status; these are described in "IRS Publication 1828: Tax Guide for Churches and Religious Organizations", which outlines activities which are allowed and not allowed by churches under the 501(c)(3) designation.

In 1980, the United States District Court for the District of Columbia recognized a 14-part test in determining whether a religious organization is considered a church for the purposes of the Internal Revenue Code:

1. A distinct legal entity;
2. A recognized creed and form of worship;
3. A definite and distinct ecclesiastical government;
4. A formal code of doctrine and discipline;
5. A distinct religious history;
6. A membership not associated with any other church or denomination;
7. A complete organization of ordained ministers ministering to their congregations;
8. Ordained ministers selected after completed prescribed courses of study;
9. Literature of its own;
10. Established places of worship;
11. Regular congregations;
12. Regular religious services;
13. Sunday schools for the religious instruction of the young;
14. Schools for the preparation of its ministers.

Having an established congregation served by an organized ministry is of central importance. Points 4, 6, 8, 11, 12, and 13 are also especially important. Nevertheless, the 14-point list is a guideline; it is not intended to be all-encompassing, and other facts and circumstances may be relevant factors.

Although there is no definitive definition of a church for Internal Revenue Code purposes, in 1986 the United States Tax Court said that "A church is a coherent group of individuals and families that join together to accomplish the religious purposes of mutually held beliefs. In other words, a church's principal means of accomplishing its religious purposes must be to assemble regularly a group of individuals related by common worship and faith."

The United States Tax Court has stated that, while a church can certainly broadcast its religious services by radio, radio broadcasts themselves do not constitute a congregation unless there is a group of people physically attending those religious services. A church can conduct worship services in various specific locations rather than in one official location. A church may have a significant number of people associate themselves with the church on a regular basis, even if the church does not have a traditional established list of individual members. In order to qualify as a tax-exempt church, church activities must be a significant part of the organization's operations.

An organization whose operations include a substantial nonexempt commercial purposes, such as operating restaurants and grocery stores in a manner consistent with a particular religion's religious beliefs does not qualify as a tax-exempt church.

== Hospitals ==
Under the Affordable Care Act, hospital organizations must also meet the requirements imposed by section 501(r) on a facility-by-facility basis:

- Hospitals must conduct a community health needs assessment every three years, solicit input from public health and community representatives, publish the results, and adopt a strategy to address identified health needs.
- Hospitals must adopt, implement, and widely publicize a financial assistance policy that defines eligibility, outlines application procedures, and ensures nondiscriminatory emergency treatment.
- Hospitals must limit charges for emergency and medically necessary care provided to financial-assistance-eligible patients to the amounts generally billed to insured individuals and may not bill gross charges for other covered care.
- Hospitals must make reasonable efforts to determine a patient's financial assistance eligibility before pursuing extraordinary collection actions such as lawsuits, liens, or credit reporting.

In practice, hospital policies often don't cover outside contracted physicians or narrowly defined medically necessary services, leaving patients who technically qualify for charity care still responsible for significant medical bills.

== Political campaign activities ==
Organizations described in section 501(c)(3) are prohibited from conducting political campaign activities to intervene in elections to public office. The Internal Revenue Service website elaborates on this prohibition:

Under the Internal Revenue Code, all section 501(c)(3) organizations are absolutely prohibited from directly or indirectly participating in, or intervening in, any political campaign on behalf of (or in opposition to) any candidate for elective public office. Contributions to political campaign funds or public statements of position (verbal or written) made on behalf of the organization in favor of or in opposition to any candidate for public office clearly violate the prohibition against political campaign activity. Violating this prohibition may result in denial or revocation of tax-exempt status and the imposition of certain excise taxes.

Certain activities or expenditures may not be prohibited depending on the facts and circumstances. For example, certain voter education activities (including presenting public forums and publishing voter education guides) conducted in a non-partisan manner do not constitute prohibited political campaign activity. In addition, other activities intended to encourage people to participate in the electoral process, such as voter registration and get-out-the-vote drives, would not be prohibited political campaign activity if conducted in a non-partisan manner.

On the other hand, voter education or registration activities with evidence of bias that (a) favor one candidate over another, (b) oppose a candidate in some manner, or (c) favor a candidate or group of candidates, constitute prohibited participation or intervention.

As an exception to the above, the Internal Revenue Service stated in a court filing that "communications from a house of worship to its congregation in connection with religious services through its usual channels of communication on matters of faith" is not considered conducting political campaign activities to intervene in elections to public office and does not conflict with the status of the place of worship.

=== Constitutionality ===
Since section 501(c)(3)'s political-activity prohibition was enacted, "commentators and litigants have challenged the provision on numerous constitutional grounds", such as freedom of speech, vagueness, and equal protection and selective prosecution. Historically, Supreme Court decisions, such as Regan v. Taxation with Representation of Washington, suggested that the Court, if it were to squarely examine the political-activity prohibition of § 501(c)(3), would uphold it against a constitutional challenge. However, some have suggested that a successful challenge to the political activities prohibition of Section 501(c)(3) might be more plausible in light of Citizens United v. FEC.

== Lobbying ==
In contrast to the prohibition on political campaign interventions by all section 501(c)(3) organizations, public charities (but not private foundations) may conduct a limited amount of lobbying to influence legislation. Although the law states that "no substantial part" of a public charity's activities can go to lobbying, charities with large budgets may lawfully expend a million dollars (under the "expenditure" test) or more (under the "substantial part" test) per year on lobbying.

The Internal Revenue Service has never defined the term "substantial part" with respect to lobbying.

To establish a safe harbor for the "substantial part" test, the United States Congress enacted §501(h), called the Conable election after its author, Representative Barber Conable. The section establishes limits based on operating budget that a charity can use to determine if it meets the substantial test. This changes the prohibition against direct intervention in partisan contests only for lobbying. The organization is now presumed in compliance with the substantiality test if they work within the limits. The Conable election requires a charity to file a declaration with the IRS and file a functional distribution of funds spreadsheet with their Form 990. IRS form 5768 is required to make the Conable election.

== Foreign activities ==
A 501(c)(3) organization is allowed to conduct some or all of its charitable activities outside the United States. A 501(c)(3) organization is allowed to award grants to foreign charitable organizations if the grants are intended for charitable purposes and the grant funds are subject to the 501(c)(3) organization's control. Additional procedures are required of 501(c)(3) organizations that are private foundations.

=== Allowance of tax-deduction by donors ===
Donors' contributions to a 501(c)(3) organization are tax-deductible only if the contribution is for the use of the 501(c)(3) organization, and that the 501(c)(3) organization is not merely serving as an agent or conduit of a foreign charitable organization. The 501(c)(3) organization's management should review the grant application from the foreign organization, decide whether to award the grant based on the intended use of the funds, and require continuous oversight based on the use of funds.

If the donor imposes a restriction or earmark that the contribution must be used for foreign activities, then the contribution is deemed to be for the foreign organization rather than the 501(c)(3) organization, and the contribution is not tax-deductible.

The purpose of the grant to the foreign organization cannot include endorsing or opposing political candidates for elected office in any country.

=== Foreign subsidiaries ===
If a 501(c)(3) organization sets up and controls a foreign subsidiary to facilitate charitable work in a foreign country, then donors' contributions to the 501(c)(3) organization are tax-deductible even if intended to fund the foreign charitable activities.

If a foreign organization sets up a 501(c)(3) organization for the sole purpose of raising funds for the foreign organization, and the 501(c)(3) organization sends substantially all contributions to the foreign organization, then donors' contributions to the 501(c)(3) organization are not tax-deductible to the donors.

== Differences between 501(c)(3) and 501(c)(4) ==
The main differences between 501(c)(3) and 501(c)(4) organizations lie in their purposes and the tax-exempt benefits they receive.

=== Purpose ===
501(c)(3) organizations are commonly referred to as charitable organizations. Their primary purpose is to serve the public interest by engaging in activities such as religious, educational, scientific, or charitable work. They must operate exclusively for exempt purposes, and any earnings must be used to further their mission. On the other hand, 501(c)(4) organizations are known as social welfare organizations. Their main purpose is to promote the common good and the general welfare of a community. While they can engage in some charitable activities, they have more flexibility to pursue a broader range of activities, including advocacy, lobbying, and political activities that promote social welfare.

=== Tax deductibility of donations ===
Donations made to 501(c)(3) organizations are typically tax-deductible for the donors, meaning individuals and businesses can claim those donations as deductions on their tax returns, subject to certain limitations. This tax benefit encourages charitable giving. In contrast, donations made to 501(c)(4) organizations are not generally tax-deductible. This means individuals and businesses cannot claim deductions for donations to these organizations, as their activities are often focused on social welfare and may involve more political or lobbying efforts.

=== Political activity ===
501(c)(3) organizations are subject to strict limitations on their involvement in political campaigns or activities. They are generally prohibited from engaging in any partisan political activity or endorsing or opposing specific candidates for public office. However, they can engage in limited non-partisan educational and advocacy activities related to specific issues. 501(c)(4) organizations have more leeway in engaging in political activities. They can participate in lobbying efforts and engage in a certain amount of political campaign activities, as long as those activities are not their primary focus.

=== Financial reporting ===
There are differences in financial reporting requirements between 501(c)(3) and 501(c)(4) organizations. 501(c)(3) organizations must provide detailed financial information through the IRS Form 990, which is publicly available. This transparency helps maintain accountability and trust in the nonprofit sector. 501(c)(4) organizations also file Form 990, but they have more flexibility in reporting certain financial information. While they must still disclose some financial details, they have more options to protect the privacy of their donors.
