= TXNM Energy =

Public utility in New Mexico, United States

TXNM Energy, Inc.
- Formerly: PNM Resources, Inc.
- Company type: Public
- Traded as: NYSE: TXNM; S&P 400 component
- Headquarters: Albuquerque, New Mexico, U.S.
- Number of employees: over 1,600 (2023)
- Website: www.txnmenergy.com

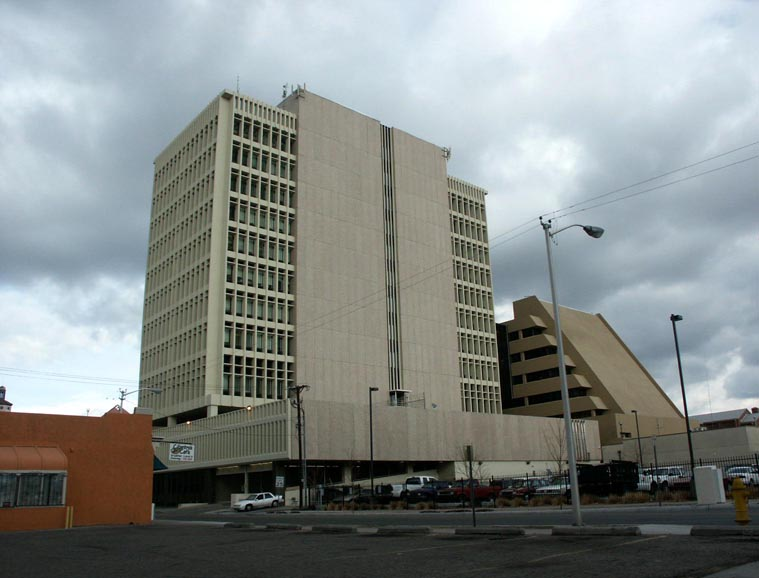
PNM headquarters at Alvarado Plaza in Albuquerque

TXNM Energy, Inc. (formerly PNM Resources) is an energy holding company based in Albuquerque, New Mexico. TXNM was founded in 1917 as the Albuquerque Gas and Electric Company. TXNM Energy owns both PNM and Texas - New Mexico Power (TNMP). In 2025, Blackstone Inc.'s infrastructure business agreed to acquire the company for an enterprise value of $11.5 billion.

Headquartered in Albuquerque, TXNM Energy has a diverse energy portfolio and combined with their purchased power resources contribute to a total generation capacity of approximately 2.7 gigawatts and serves electricity to 800,000 residential and business customers across New Mexico and Texas.

== Primary holdings ==
=== TNMP ===
Texas-New Mexico Power is a corporation that is wholly owned by TXNM Energy. It is a regulated electric utility operating in Texas. TNMP was sold in a leveraged buyout in 2000. TXNM acquired Texas—New Mexico Power in 2005 and moved the New Mexico properties to TXNM in 2006. TNMP is headquartered in Lewisville, Texas.

== Corporate organization and history ==
TXNM was founded in 1917 as the Albuquerque Gas and Electric Company. TXNM sold the gas part of the business to Southern Union Gas Company of Dallas in 1949. These sold portions became the Gas Company of New Mexico. In 1985, however, PNM reacquired the Gas Company of New Mexico after Southern Union Gas Company reached a settlement stemming from federal antitrust litigation. In 1994, both electric and gas operations began serving customers as PNM.

In May 2003, TXNM Energy' utility subsidiary, PNM, was recognized by the American Wind Energy Association's Utility Leadership Award for PNM's role in the creation of the New Mexico Wind Energy Center. The award was presented at the National Wind Energy Conference in Austin, Texas.

In 2008, PNM sold New Mexico Gas to Continental Energy, a company backed by the private equity firm Lindsay Goldberg. It was later acquired by TECO Energy. It will soon become a division of Halifax, Canada-based Emera when its acquisition of TECO Energy closes by mid-2016.

On October 21, 2020, the company announced a strategic merger with Avangrid, a subsidiary of Iberdrola.
