= Tax Reform Act of 1969 =

US federal law

- Long title: An Act to reform the income tax laws.
- Acronyms (colloquial): TRA69
- Enacted by: the 91st United States Congress
- Effective: December 30, 1969

Citations
- Public law: Pub. L. 91–172
- Statutes at Large: 83 Stat. 487

Codification
- Acts amended: Internal Revenue Code of 1954
- Titles amended: 26

Legislative history
- Introduced in the House as H.R. 13270 by D‑AR representativeth Wilbur Mills on August 1, 1969; Committee consideration by House Committee on Ways and Means, Senate Committee on Finance; Passed the House on August 7, 1969; Passed the Senate on December 11, 1969 (69–22); Reported by the joint conference committee on December 15–19, 1969; agreed to by the House on December 22, 1969 (381–2) and by the Senate on December 22, 1969 (71–6); Signed into law by President Richard Nixon on December 30, 1969

The Tax Reform Act of 1969 (Pub. L. 91–172) was a United States federal tax law signed by President Richard Nixon on December 30, 1969. Its largest impact was creating the alternative minimum tax, which was intended to tax high-income earners who had previously avoided incurring tax liability due to various exemptions and deductions.

It also established individual and corporate minimum taxes and a new tax schedule for single taxpayers. The act slightly increased standard deductions and personal exemptions and created more stringent requirements on nonprofit organizations, which many argue drove them to professionalization. One requirement in the law was that foundations were unable to control a private company, and the distinction between public charities and private foundations was created. Associate Professor of Law Philip Hackney said Congress "revamped the tax rules to force charitable foundations created and controlled by the wealthy to pay out charitable dollars annually and avoid self-dealing."

== Summary ==
The Office of Tax Analysis of the United States Department of the Treasury summarized the tax changes as follows:

- phased-in increase in personal exemption amount from $600 to $750
- repealed investment tax credit
- increased minimum standard deduction from $300 plus $100 per capita (total max $1,000) to $1,000
- phased-in increase in percentage standard deduction from 10% to 15%
- temporarily extended income tax surcharge at 5% annual rate (through June 30, 1970)
- established individual and corporate minimum taxes
- established new tax rate schedule for single taxpayers
- delayed scheduled reduction in telephone and auto excise taxes

The act provided a government definition of private foundation for the first time (albeit indirectly). The law enacted these requirements of private philanthropic foundations:

- 4% tax on investment income (reduced to 2% in 1978)
- 5% minimum distribution of income
- Limit of 20% ownership of the stock holdings of a business
- Prohibition on the attempt to influence legislation or elections including voter registration drives
- Taxation on unrelated business income
- Prohibitions on self-dealing; officers and donors could not benefit financially from their transactions with the foundation
- Enhanced reporting requirements, including grants awarded; public access to all of this information guaranteed

== Capital gains ==
The explanation of the act prepared by staff of the Congress Joint Committee on Taxation says:

20. Alternative capital gains tax rate.—The Act gradually eliminates the alternative tax on long-term capital gains for individual taxpayers to the extent they have capital gains of more than $50,000. Long-term capital gains up to $50,000 received by individuals continue to qualify for the 25-percent alternative capital gains tax rate. However, the maximum tax rate on that part of long-term capital gains above $50,000 is increased to 29.5 percent in 1970, 32.5 percent in 1971, and 35 percent (one-half the 70 percent top tax rate applicable to ordinary income) in 1972 and later years. The alternative tax rate on corporate long-term capital gains income is increased to 28 percent in 1970 and 30 percent in 1971 and later years."

The act also included for the first time an alternative minimum tax, set at 10%. The change was explained as follows:

The prior treatment imposed no limit on the amount of income which an individual or corporation could exclude from tax as the result of various tax preferences. As a result, there were large variations in the tax burdens placed on individuals or corporations with similar economic incomes, depending upon the size of their preference income. In general, those individual or corporate taxpayers who received the bulk of their income from personal services or manufacturing were taxed at relatively higher tax rates than others. On the other hand, individuals or corporations which received the bulk of their income from such sources as capital gains or were in a position to benefit from net lease arrangements, from accelerated depreciation on real estate, from percentage depletion, or from other tax-preferred activities tended to pay relatively low rates of tax. In fact, many individuals with high incomes who could benefit from these provisions paid lower effective rates of tax than many individuals with modest incomes. In extreme cases, individuals enjoyed large economic incomes without paying any tax at all. This was true for example in the case of 154 returns in 1966 with adjusted gross incomes of $200,000 a year (apart from those with income exclusions which do not show on the returns filed). Similarly, a number of large corporations paid either no tax at all or taxes which represented very low effective rates."

== Alternative minimum tax ==
Before 1969, there were people with income exceeding $200,000 (equivalent to $1.76 million in 2025) who had paid zero income tax because of tax deductions and tax credits. The alternative minimum tax was included in the Tax Reform Act of 1969 in order to require these high-income people to pay some income tax.

By 2003, 1.8% of all taxpayers (or 2.4 million income tax returns) paid the alternative minimum tax. The Tax Policy Center reports that 4.3 million taxpayers paid the alternative minimum tax in 2011. However, those who pay the Alternative Minimum Tax may be eligible to take a tax credit in future years in which they are not required to pay Alternative Minimum Tax.

The alternative minimum tax was not indexed for inflation until 2013.

== Inflation-adjusted numbers ==
Corrected for inflation by CPI:

1969 dollars	2025 dollars
$100	$878
$300	$2634
$600	$5268
$750	$6585
$1,000	$8779
