= List of presidential trips made by George H. W. Bush (1992–93) =

This is a list of presidential trips made by George H. W. Bush during 1992–1993, the fourth and final year of his presidency as the 41st president of the United States. International trips are highlighted in blue.

This list excludes trips made within Washington, D.C., the U.S. federal capital in which the White House, the official residence and principal workplace of the president, is located. It also excludes the capital's immediate surroundings in Maryland and Virginia, such as Andrews Air Force Base in Maryland, where the president typically boards Air Force One for all trips outside the area. Also excluded are trips to Camp David, the country residence of the president, and to the Bush family compound in Kennebunkport, Maine.

== January 1992 ==
State or country	Areas visited	Dates	Details
Australia	Sydney, Canberra, Melbourne	December 31–January 3	Met with Prime Minister Paul Keating and senior Australian officials. Addressed the Australian Parliament.
Singapore	Singapore	January 3–5	Met with President Wee Kim Wee and Prime Minister Goh Chok Tong. Attended a meeting of the ASEAN Business Council.
South Korea	Seoul	January 5–7	Met with President Roh Tae-woo and senior South Korean officials. Signed a science and technology agreement. Addressed the South Korean National Assembly. Visited U.S. military personnel.
Japan	Kyoto, Kashihara, Tokyo	January 7–10	Met with Emperor Akihito, Prime Minister Kiichi Miyazawa and senior Japanese officials.
Missouri	Kansas City	January 13	Addressed the American Farm Bureau Federation at Municipal Auditorium.
New Hampshire	Portsmouth, Exeter, Dover, Rochester	January 15	Participated in a roundtable discussion on economic development at Pease Air National Guard Base. Visited the farm of Doug Scamman Jr. Attended a townhall meeting at Exeter Town Hall. Toured a Textron plant and a Liberty Mutual office in Dover, and the Cabletron Systems headquarters in Rochester. Attended a Rotary Club dinner at Yoken's restaurant in Portsmouth.
Georgia	Atlanta	January 17	Observed Martin Luther King Jr. Day at the King Center for Nonviolent Social Change, where he laid a wreath at King's tomb alongside Coretta Scott King. Spoke at the Job Training 2000 initiative at Morris Brown College.
Maryland	Catonsville	January 21	Visited a local Head Start center.
Pennsylvania	Philadelphia	January 30	Addressed the Greater Philadelphia Chamber of Commerce at the Wyndham Franklin Plaza.
New York	New York	January 30–31	Attended a session of the United Nations Security Council. Stayed at the Waldorf Astoria New York.

== February ==
State or country	Areas visited	Dates	Details
Florida	Orlando	February 4	Addressed the National Grocers Association convention at the Orange County Convention Center, where his reaction to a demonstration of a barcode scanner was highly publicized.
Ohio	Cleveland	February 6	Addressed the Greater Cleveland Growth Association at the Stouffer Tower City Plaza Hotel.
Nevada	Las Vegas	February 6	Toured the University Medical Center of Southern Nevada.
California	San Diego	February 6–7	Addressed the local Rotary Club at the Sheraton Harbor Island Hotel. Toured the Logan Heights Family Health Center.
New Hampshire	Concord, Hooksett, Bedford, Manchester	February 12	Addressed the New Hampshire General Court at the State House. Toured the New Hampshire Department of Safety offices. Visited a General Electric plant in Hooksett, Bedford Mall, and the Gateway Technology Center in Manchester.
Maryland	Belcamp	February 14	Gave a press conference at the construction site of a local housing development, Arborview at Riverside.
New Hampshire	Nashua, New Boston, Goffstown, Manchester, Derry, Hollis	February 15–16	Campaigned in the 1992 New Hampshire Republican presidential primary. Spoke at New Boston Central Elementary School at Mountain View Middle School in Goffstown. Visited the home of Bishop of Manchester Leo Edward O'Neil. Visited a fishing and outdoor show at the New Hampshire Army National Guard Armory. Spoke at Pinkerton Academy, Pennichuck Junior High School in Nashua, and Hollis/Brookline High School.
Tennessee	Oak Ridge, Knoxville	February 19	Signed the Cooperative Research and Development Agreement between the Oak Ridge National Laboratory and CoorsTek at the laboratory. Spoke at Knoxville Civic Coliseum.
South Carolina	Charleston	February 21	Addressed the Southern Republican Leadership Conference at the Omni Charleston.
California	San Francisco, Los Angeles	February 25–26	Campaign fundraising event at the Westin St. Francis. Attended a meeting on the US/Mexico Environmental Border Plan Agreement at the Sheraton Airport Hotel in Los Angeles. Visited former president Ronald Reagan at 668 St. Cloud Road. Campaign fundraising event at the Century Plaza Hotel. Stayed at the Four Seasons Hotel Los Angeles.
Texas	San Antonio, Houston, Dallas	February 26–29	Attended the San Antonio Summit, a multilateral meeting of heads of state on anti-drug policy, with meetings at the Majestic Theatre and the McNay Art Museum. Attended a Points of Light event recognizing the San Antonio Spurs Drug-Free Youth Basketball League at the West End Community Center. Attended the Houston Livestock Show and Rodeo Dinner at the Sheraton Astrodome Hotel. Stayed at The Houstonian Hotel. Addressed the Associated General Contractors of America at the Dallas Convention Center.
Georgia	Atlanta, Savannah	February 29–March 1	Addressed the Georgia Republican Party at the Atlanta Marriott Marquis. Attended services at First Baptist Church. Campaigned at the Savannah Riverfront.

== March ==
State or country	Areas visited	Dates	Details
Illinois	Chicago	March 3	Addressed the National Association of Evangelicals at the Hyatt Regency O'Hare.
Florida	Plant City, Tampa, Hialeah, Miami	March 4–5	Attended the Florida Strawberry Festival in Plant City. Campaign fundraising event at the Omni Westshore Hotel in Tampa, Henry Milander Park in Hialeah, and the Radisson Mart Plaza Hotel in Miami. Stayed at the Airport Hilton Miami.
South Carolina	Columbia	March 5	Addressed the Home Builders Association of Greater Columbia at the South Carolina State Fairgrounds. Visited the South Carolina Governor's Mansion.
Tennessee	Memphis	March 5	Spoke at the Federal Express hangar at Memphis International Airport.
Oklahoma	Oklahoma City	March 5–6	Attended a regional Wal-Mart corporate meeting at the Myriad Convention Center. Visited Cattlemen's Steakhouse. Stayed at the Sheraton Century Center. Spoke at Oklahoma Christian University.
Louisiana	Baton Rouge	March 6	Spoke at Louisiana State University's Pete Maravich Assembly Center.
Mississippi	Jackson	March 6	Spoke at the Mississippi State Capitol.
Florida	Pensacola	March 6–7	Visited Skopelos on the Bay. Stayed at the Pensacola Hilton. Spoke at the National Naval Aviation Museum.
Alabama	Montgomery	March 7	Attended a bass fishing tournament.
Michigan	Kalamazoo, Detroit	March 13	Toured a Stryker Corporation facility. Addressed the Detroit Economic Club.
Wisconsin	Milwaukee	March 16	Spoke at a local business, Steeltech Inc. Campaign fundraising event at The Pfister Hotel.
Illinois	Chicago	March 16	Addressed the Polish National Alliance at its headquarters. Campaign fundraising event at the Hyatt Regency Chicago.
Arkansas	Bentonville	March 17	Presented the Presidential Medal of Freedom to Sam Walton at Wal-Mart headquarters. Walton was unable to travel to Washington to receive the honor due to cancer, from which he died three weeks later. With this trip, Bush fulfilled a 1988 campaign pledge to visit all 50 states while in office, as Arkansas was the last remaining state he had not yet visited.

== April ==
State or country	Areas visited	Dates	Details
Pennsylvania	Philadelphia	April 3	Addressed the local chapter of the Federalist Society at Congress Hall.
Maryland	Baltimore	April 6	Threw out the ceremonial first pitch on Opening Day of Major League Baseball at the new Oriole Park at Camden Yards stadium.
Michigan	Fraser, Dearborn	April 14	Toured the Giddings & Lewis plant in Fraser and the Ford River Rouge complex. Campaign fundraising event at the Ritz-Carlton Hotel in Dearborn.
Pennsylvania	Allentown	April 16	Spoke about the America 2000 education initiative at Louis E. Dieruff High School.
Ohio	Columbus	April 20	Opened the AmeriFlora '92 horticultural exposition.
Florida	Miami Beach	April 27	Gave the commencement address to students of Florida International University at the Miami Beach Convention Center.
North Carolina	Charlotte	April 27	Campaign fundraising event at the Adam's Mark hotel.
Ohio	Columbus	April 30	Addressed the Ohio Association of Broadcasters at the Hyatt on Capitol Square. Campaign fundraising event at the Ohio State Fairgrounds.

== May ==
State or country	Areas visited	Dates	Details
California	Los Angeles	May 6–8	Surveyed the aftermath of the 1992 Los Angeles riots. Stayed at the Westin Bonaventure Hotel. Spoke at Mount Zion Missionary Baptist Church. Met with state and local officials at the Ronald Reagan State Building. Interviewed at KMPC radio studios. Visited Scott Miller, a firefighter shot during the riots, at Cedars-Sinai Medical Center. Spoke at the Los Angeles Memorial Coliseum. Toured the Challenger Boys & Girls Club.
Pennsylvania	Philadelphia	May 11	Participated in a roundtable discussion on the Weed and Seed program at St. Boniface Church. Campaign fundraising event at the Hotel Atop The Bellevue.
Maryland	Baltimore	May 13	Toured the East Baltimore Medical Center. Spoke at Paul Laurence Dunbar High School.
Pennsylvania	Pittsburgh	May 15	Campaign fundraising event at Duquesne University's Union Building. Met with community leaders at Hill House.
Texas	Houston, Dallas	May 15–17	Addressed a United Negro College Fund benefit at the Wyndham Hotel Greenspoint. Stayed at The Houstonian Hotel. Gave the commencement address at Southern Methodist University's Moody Coliseum. Visited Turkish president Turgut Özal at Houston Methodist Hospital, where he was recovering from prostate cancer surgery. Visited the home of his friend Baine Kerr. Attended services at St. Martin's Episcopal Church.
Indiana	South Bend	May 17	Gave the commencement address at the University of Notre Dame's Joyce Center.
Ohio	Cleveland, Parma	May 21	Campaign fundraising event at the Stouffer Tower City Plaza Hotel. Observed Freedom Day at St. Josaphat Ukrainian Catholic Cathedral.
New York	White Plains	May 21	Campaign fundraising event at Westchester County Airport.
Connecticut	Greenwich	May 21	Visited the home of his mother, Dorothy Wear Walker Bush.
Maryland	Annapolis	May 27	Gave the commencement address at the United States Naval Academy's Navy–Marine Corps Memorial Stadium.
Georgia	Kennesaw, Atlanta	May 27	Toured Mount Paran Christian School. Campaign fundraising event at the Stouffer Waverly Hotel.
Arizona	Phoenix	May 28	Addressed the local American Legion chapter. Campaigned for Senator John McCain at Phoenix Civic Plaza.
California	Los Angeles, Fresno	May 28–30	Stayed at the Sheraton Grand Los Angeles. Toured the temporary disaster relief facility responding to riot damage at the Harvard Recreation Center in Harvard Park. Addressed a Town Hall of California meeting at The Biltmore Los Angeles. Visited former president Ronald Reagan at his office in Fox Plaza. Toured the Sheriff's Youth Athletic League gymnasium at the Lynwood Youth Athletic Center. Attended the Asian-Pacific American Heritage Dinner at the Hyatt Regency hotel. Took questions from the agricultural community at a vineyard in Fresno. Attended the Miracles in the Sky Air Show at Fresno Air Terminal.
Texas	Dallas	May 30	Campaign fundraising event at the Grand Kempinski Hotel.

== June ==
State or country	Areas visited	Dates	Details
Pennsylvania	Bowmansdale	June 9	Campaigned for Senator Arlen Specter on a local farm.
Panama	Panama City	June 11	Met with President Guillermo Endara. Delivered public addresses.
Brazil	Rio de Janeiro	June 12–13	Attended the Earth Summit Meeting.
Maryland	Annapolis	June 17	Hosted Russian president Boris Yeltsin on a cruise down the Severn River, as part of a larger summit which took place mostly in Washington.
California	Newark, Orinda, Newport Beach, Irvine, Universal City	June 18–20	Toured the Evergreen Oil Company refinery in Newark. Met with northern California Republican leaders at the Newark Hilton Hotel. Attended a Republican fundraising event at a private residence in Orinda. Stayed at the Four Seasons Newport Beach. Took questions from the Industrial League of Orange County at the Hyatt Regency Irvine. Visited Corona del Mar State Beach, intending to briefly swim but the Secret Service ushered him away when his presence attracted too much attention from other beachgoers. Addressed the Howard Jarvis Taxpayers Association at the Universal City Hilton.
Texas	Dallas	June 20	Addressed the Republican Party of Texas convention at the Dallas Convention Center.
New York	New York	June 29	Dedicated a new Drug Enforcement Administration field office, where he denounced Time Warner for releasing Body Count's "Cop Killer". Campaigned for Al D'Amato at the New York Hilton Midtown.
Michigan	Southfield, Detroit	June 29	Took questions from Michigan law enforcement officers at the Southfield Civic Center. Campaign fundraising event at the Westin Renaissance Center.

== July ==
State or country	Areas visited	Dates	Details
Florida	Daytona Beach	July 4	Attended the Pepsi 400 at Daytona International Speedway, Richard Petty's final race.
North Carolina	Faith	July 4	Celebrated Independence Day at Legion Park.
Poland	Warsaw	July 5	Met with President Lech Wałęsa. Attended a memorial service for former prime minister Ignacy Jan Paderewski.
Germany	Munich	July 5–8	Attended the 18th G7 summit. Also met with Russian president Boris Yeltsin.
Finland	Helsinki	July 8–10	Attended the CSCE Summit Meeting.
California	Tulare County, San Diego	July 14	Signed Proclamation 6457 at Sequoia National Park. Met with Mexican president Carlos Salinas de Gortari at the Mission San Diego de Alcalá, before both presidents attended the 1992 Major League Baseball All-Star Game at Jack Murphy Stadium.
Wyoming	Boulder, Jackson	July 14–17	Stayed at Secretary of State James Baker's ranch in Boulder.
Utah	Salt Lake City, Provo	July 18	Met with Mormon leaders at the Church Administration Building. Took questions from outdoor groups at the Red Butte Garden and Arboretum. Spoke at Brigham Young University's Marriott Center.
Pennsylvania	Philadelphia	July 21	Hosted the Presidential Open Forum on Educational Choice at Archbishop Ryan High School.
New Jersey	Garfield	July 21	Spoke at Three Saints Russian Orthodox Church.
Ohio	Brookville, Dayton	July 24	Spoke at a community picnic at Brookville's Golden Gate Park. Attended an Ohio Republican Party meeting at Dayton International Airport.
Missouri	Columbia	July 24	Participated in a roundtable discussion on families at Shelter Gardens. Attended the opening ceremony of the Show-Me State Games at the University of Missouri's Hearnes Center.
Michigan	Wyoming	July 27	Toured the Holland American Wafer plant.
Wisconsin	Neenah	July 27	Toured the Outlook Graphics plant.
Texas	Waxahachie	July 30	Visited the Superconducting Super Collider facility under construction.
California	Anaheim, Riverside, Los Angeles	July 30–31	Toured an Odetics, Inc., plant. Attended a breakfast for community service clubs at the Riverside Convention Center. Received the report of the Presidential Task Force on Los Angeles Recovery. Attended Presidential Trust receptions at the Century Plaza Hotel, where he stayed overnight, and at two private residences in Los Angeles.

== August ==
State or country	Areas visited	Dates	Details
Illinois	Rosemont, Elk Grove Village	August 2	Campaigned for Richard S. Williamson for Senate at the Hyatt Regency O'Hare. Addressed the Northwest Republican Family Picnic at Elk Grove Community Park with Illinois governor Jim Edgar.
Georgia	Dalton	August 3	Toured two local businesses, Multitex and the Shaw Industries distribution center.
Florida	Jacksonville	August 3	Campaign fundraising event at the Omni Jacksonville Hotel.
New York	New York	August 5	Addressed the Knights of Columbus Supreme Council convention at the New York Marriott Marquis alongside John Cardinal O'Connor.
Nevada	Reno	August 5	Addressed the Disabled American Veterans National Convention at the Reno Hilton.
Colorado	Colorado Springs	August 5	Addressed the American Legislative Exchange Council at The Broadmoor. Interviewed by James Dobson at Focus on the Family headquarters.
Indiana	Indianapolis	August 17	Addressed the Veterans of Foreign Wars National Convention at the Indiana Convention Center. Campaigned for Senator Dan Coats at the Westin Hotel.
Texas	Houston	August 17–21	Accepted the nomination of the 1992 Republican National Convention at the Astrodome. Attended other RNC events at the George R. Brown Convention Center and the Hyatt Regency Houston Downtown. Stayed at The Houstonian Hotel. Spoke about anti-drug policy at Hamilton Middle School. Attended a prayer breakfast at the University of Houston.
Mississippi	Gulfport	August 21	Campaign speech at Jones Park.
Missouri	Branson	August 21–22	Campaign speech at Silver Dollar City.
Georgia	Woodstock	August 22	Spoke on Main Street.
Alabama	Hoover	August 22	Addressed the Pride in Alabama Rally at Riverchase Galleria mall.
Texas	Dallas	August 22–23	Addressed the National Affairs Briefing at the Dallas Convention Center.
Illinois	Springfield	August 23	Spoke at the Illinois State Fairgrounds.
New Jersey	Union	August 24	Toured the local Lincoln Technical Institute campus.
Connecticut	Ansonia	August 24	Campaign fundraising event at a private residence. Addressed the local Chamber of Commerce at Warsaw Park.
Florida	Opa-Locka	August 24	Surveyed damage from Hurricane Andrew, which made landfall in Florida earlier that day.
Illinois	Chicago	August 25	Addressed the American Legion National Convention at the Sheraton Chicago.
Michigan	Canton	August 25	Campaign speech at Canton Township Heritage Park.
Louisiana	Lafayette	August 26	Surveyed damage from Hurricane Andrew, which made landfall in Louisiana earlier that day.
Missouri	St. Louis	August 27	Toured a local business, Public Safety Equipment, Inc. Campaign fundraising event at the Stouffer Breckenridge Concourse Hotel.
Ohio	Cincinnati, Findlay	August 27	Campaign speech at Fountain Square. Toured a local business, Findlay Machine and Tool, at Tall Timbers Industrial Park.

== September ==
State or country	Areas visited	Dates	Details
Florida	Homestead	September 1	Spoke about Hurricane Andrew disaster relief efforts at Homestead Middle School.
Louisiana	Lafayette	September 1	Toured Hurricane Andrew disaster relief efforts.
South Dakota	Humboldt	September 2	Visited a local farm.
Texas	Shallowater, Fort Worth	September 2	Toured a local business, the Shallowater Co-op Gin Company. Visited the General Dynamics facility at Carswell Air Force Base.
Virginia	Fredericksburg	September 4	Visited a local business, Fredericksburg Hardware, and spoke at another, Goolrick's Pharmacy.
Ohio	Painesville	September 5	Attended Oktoberfest at the Lake County Fairgrounds. Campaign fundraising event at the Grange Food Hall.
South Carolina	Greenville	September 5	Spoke at Greenville–Spartanburg International Airport.
North Carolina	Asheville, Hendersonville	September 5	Visited the home of Roy Harris, an ordinary citizen who had invited Bush to visit upon meeting him at the White House in July. Spoke at the North Carolina Apple Festival at Henderson County Courthouse.
Kentucky	Louisville	September 5–6	Attended a Louisville Redbirds game at Cardinal Stadium. Campaign fundraising event at the Executive Inn.
Illinois	Chicago	September 6	Attended the Taste of Polonia festival at the Copernicus Center.
Michigan	Sault Ste. Marie, Mackinac City	September 6–7	Stayed at the Ojibway Hotel in Sault Ste. Marie, where he was interviewed by Tom Brokaw. Participated in the Mackinac Bridge Walk.
Wisconsin	Waukesha	September 7	Addressed a Republican Party Labor Day picnic at the Waukesha County Exposition Grounds.
Michigan	Hamtramck	September 7	Participated in the Polish Festival parade.
Pennsylvania	Norristown, Collegeville	September 9	Spoke at Norristown High School. Took questions from employees at a local Collegeville business, Uniform Tubes.
New Jersey	Middletown	September 9	Campaign speech at the Veterans of Foreign Wars Hall.
Michigan	Detroit	September 10	Took questions from the Detroit Economic Club. Campaign fundraising event at Cobo Hall.
Missouri	Joplin, Excelsior Springs, Kansas City, St. Louis	September 11	Spoke at Missouri Southern State College. Visited the headquarters of Contract Freighters, Inc. Toured a Job Corps center in Excelsior Springs. Campaign fundraising event at the Kansas City Airport Hilton Inn. Spoke at McDonnell Douglas headquarters.
Virginia	Virginia Beach	September 11	Addressed the Christian Coalition of America's Road to Victory Conference at the Founders Inn and Convention Center.
California	Anaheim, San Diego	September 13–14	Spoke at Yorba Regional Park in Anaheim. Addressed conservation organizations in Rancho Peñasquitos.
Washington	Colville, Spokane	September 14	Met with the Jobs Coalition for Washington State at a local Colville business, Vaagen Brothers Lumber, Inc. Campaign fundraising event at Spokane International Airport.
Oregon	Medford	September 14	Spoke at a local business, Burrill Lumber. Campaign fundraising event at Erickson Air-Crane headquarters.
Utah	Salt Lake City	September 14–15	Addressed the National Guard Association of the United States at the Salt Palace, where he also held a campaign fundraising event.
Colorado	Englewood	September 15	Spoke at Jeppesen Sanderson headquarters. Campaign fundraising event at the Scanticon Hotel.
New Mexico	Albuquerque	September 15	Toured Sandia National Laboratories. Campaign fundraising event at the Cutter Aviation hangar at Albuquerque International Sunport.
Oklahoma	Enid	September 17	Spoke at Convention Hall. Met with Oklahoma independent oil and gas producers at the Best Western.
Georgia	Jonesboro, Atlanta	September 17	Spoke at a housing construction site in Jonesboro. Attended a ceremony for the arrival of the Olympic flag from Barcelona at the Georgia Dome.
New Jersey	Basking Ridge	September 19	Visited AT&T Corporation headquarters.
New York	New York	September 21	Addressed the opening session of the 47th United Nations General Assembly. Interviewed on The Rush Limbaugh Show at WABC studios. Campaign fundraising event at the Waldorf Astoria.
Missouri	Springfield	September 22	Spoke at University Plaza Convention Center.
Oklahoma	Tulsa	September 22	Spoke at Tulsa International Airport.
Texas	Longview	September 22	Spoke at Gregg County Airport.
Louisiana	Shreveport	September 22	Spoke at Shreveport Regional Airport.
Mississippi	Greenville	September 22	Spoke at Greenville Municipal Airport.
Tennessee	Memphis	September 22	Spoke at Craigmont High School.
North Carolina	Greensboro	September 23	Addressed the business community at the Joseph S. Koury Convention Center.
Pennsylvania	State College	September 23	Spoke at Penn State University on the Old Main lawn.
Illinois	Schaumburg, Chicago	September 25	Visited Motorola headquarters. Addressed the National Technology Initiative Conference at the University of Chicago's Mandel Hall. Attended a "Working Families for Bush-Quayle" rally at the Chicago Hilton and Towers.
Ohio	Columbus, Marysville, Arlington, Findlay, Bowling Green	September 25–26	Began a whistle-stop train tour aboard the Spirit of America, starting at the Old Mound Freight Yard in Columbus. Spoke from the train's observation deck at each city, except in Arlington, where he attended the Centennial Family Picnic at Arlington Park.
Michigan	Plymouth, Livonia, Wixom, Milford, Holly, Grand Blanc, Flint	September 26–27	Continued the whistle-stop tour aboard the Spirit of America. Spoke from the train's observation deck at each city, except Livonia and Flint, which were reached by motorcade. Stayed at the Marriott hotel in Livonia.
Missouri	St. Louis	September 28	Spoke at the St. Francis de Sales Oratory. Campaign fundraising event at the Stouffer Breckenridge Concourse Hotel.
Texas	Dallas	September 28–29	Visited the East Dallas Renaissance Neighborhood Project. Attended the United States Hispanic Chamber of Commerce convention at the Loews Anatole Hotel. Campaign fundraising event and a Presidential Trust reception at private residences.
Tennessee	Blountville, Knoxville, Chattanooga, Clarksville, Nashville	September 29	Spoke at Tri-Cities Regional Airport, McGhee Tyson Airport, Lovell Field, Austin Peay State University's Dunn Center, and the Roy Acuff Theater at Opryland USA.
Wisconsin	Oshkosh, Fond du Lac	September 30	Addressed law enforcement officials at Wittman Regional Airport. Spoke at Veterans Memorial Park in Fond du Lac.
New Jersey	Newark	September 30	Addressed law enforcement officials at Newark International Airport. Spoke at a Laborers' International Union of North America local union hall.

== October ==
State or country	Areas visited	Dates	Details
Massachusetts	Boston	October 2	Received the endorsement of law enforcement officials at Florian Hall. Campaign fundraising event and a Presidential Trust reception at the Boston Park Plaza Hotel.
Florida	Clearwater, Homestead, Florida City, Fort Lauderdale, Orlando	October 2–3	Visited On Top of the World retirement community in Clearwater. Toured Hurricane Andrew disaster relief efforts in Homestead and Florida City, including temporary FEMA housing in both cities and Campbell Drive Middle School in Homestead. Attended a Fort Lauderdale Historical Association ceremony at Naval Air Station Fort Lauderdale, where Bush had received his naval aviator training in 1943. Spoke at Church Street Market in Orlando.
Delaware	Dover	October 5	Spoke on the Old State House Green. Campaign fundraising event at the Dinner Bell Inn.
Texas	San Antonio	October 7–8	Initialed the draft North American Free Trade Agreement at the Plaza San Antonio Hotel alongside Mexican president Carlos Salinas de Gortari and Canadian prime minister Brian Mulroney.
Louisiana	New Orleans	October 8	Spoke at the Port of New Orleans Nashville Avenue Wharf. Addressed law enforcement officials at Naval Air Station Joint Reserve Base New Orleans. Campaign fundraising event at the World Trade Center New Orleans.
Texas	Houston	October 8	Campaign fundraising event at the JW Marriott hotel.
Ohio	Cincinnati, Columbus	October 9	Addressed the National Fraternal Order of Police at the Holiday Inn Eastgate. Campaign fundraising event at a private residence in Columbus.
Missouri	St. Louis	October 11–12	Participated in the first presidential debate against Governor Bill Clinton and Ross Perot at the Washington University in St. Louis Field House. Spoke at St. Louis Community College–Forest Park.
Pennsylvania	Springfield	October 12	Signed the Benjamin National Franklin Memorial Commemorative Medal and Fire Service Bill of Rights Act at a local fire station. Campaign fundraising event at a private residence.
Michigan	Grand Rapids, Holland	October 12	Campaign fundraising event at a private residence in Grand Rapids. Spoke at Hope College.
Virginia	Richmond	October 15	Participated in the second presidential debate at the University of Richmond's Robins Center. Spoke at the Richmond Center.
New Jersey	Edison, Somerset	October 16	Spoke at Middlesex County College. Attended a reception at Garden State Convention Center in Somerset.
Michigan	East Lansing	October 19	Participated in the third presidential debate at Michigan State University's Wharton Center. Spoke at Lansing Civic Center.
Georgia	Atlanta, Norcross, Gainesville, Cornelia	October 19–20	Participated in a townhall meeting at WSB-TV studios. Began a whistle-stop train tour aboard the Spirit of America, starting at the Armour Drive train yard in Atlanta. Spoke from the train's observation deck at each city.
South Carolina	Spartanburg	October 20–21	Spoke from the Spirit of America train's observation deck.
North Carolina	Gastonia, Kannapolis, Thomasville, Burlington, Raleigh	October 22	Spoke from the Spirit of America train's observation deck in each city. Attended the North Carolina State Fair.
New Jersey	Vineland, Robbinsville, Ridgewood, Secaucus	October 22	Spoke in downtown Vineland, at Trenton–Robbinsville Airport, and at Veterans Memorial Park in Ridgewood. Participated in a townhall meeting at WWOR-TV studios.
Kentucky	London	October 23	Spoke at South Laurel High School.
Florida	Fort Lauderdale, Miami	October 23	Attended a Presidential Trust reception at a private residence in Fort Lauderdale. Signed the Cuban Democracy Act at the Omni Hotel Miami. Participated in a townhall meeting at WPLG studios.
Alabama	Montgomery	October 23–24	Stayed at the Marriott Courtyard Hotel. Spoke at Atlanta Crossing Shopping Center.
Texas	Houston	October 24	Attended the funeral of Betty Liedtke, wife of J. Hugh Liedtke, at First Presbyterian Church.
Louisiana	Maurice, Scott	October 24	Signed the Energy Policy Act of 1992 at Jack-Wade Drilling. Took questions at Acadiana High School.
Michigan	Detroit	October 25	Addressed the International Association of Chiefs of Police at Cobo Arena.
South Dakota	Sioux Falls	October 25	Spoke at the Sioux Empire Fairgrounds Exposition Center. Held media interviews at the Kiwanis Club Pancake House.
Montana	Billings	October 25–26	Spoke at Pioneer Park. Visited Billings Senior High School.
Colorado	Denver	October 26	Addressed the Ace Hardware convention at the Colorado Convention Center.
New Mexico	Albuquerque	October 26	Spoke at Civic Plaza.
Iowa	Des Moines	October 26–27	Visited the Iowa Republican Party headquarters. Interviewed by Bryant Gumbel on the Today Show from the Iowa State Capitol Law Library. Took questions at the Des Moines Convention Center.
Kentucky	Paducah	October 27	Spoke at Paducah Community College. Took questions at WPSD-TV studios.
Ohio	Kettering, Lima, Toledo, Strongsville, Columbus	October 27–28	Spoke at the Fraze Pavilion, Lima Allen County Airport, SeaGate Convention Centre, Strongsville Commons, and Nationwide Plaza. Took questions at the Ohio History Center.
Michigan	Southgate, Warren, Detroit, Grand Rapids	October 28–29	Addressed the South Wayne County Chamber of Commerce at the Ramada Heritage Center in Southgate. Spoke at Macomb Community College. Visited the Henry Ford Museum. Spoke at the Gerald R. Ford Presidential Museum. Took questions at the West Michigan Public Broadcasting Center.
Tennessee	Nashville	October 29–30	Addressed the Kentucky Fried Chicken convention at the Opryland Hotel.
Missouri	St. Louis	October 30	Spoke at Maryville Center Executive Park.
Wisconsin	Racine, Burlington, Sussex, Oshkosh, Stevens Point, Chippewa Falls, La Crosse	October 30–November 1	Interviewed by Larry King at Memorial Hall. Stayed at the Marriott Hotel in Racine. Began a whistle-stop train tour aboard the Spirit of America, starting at the train depot in Burlington. Spoke from the train's observation deck at each city, ending in Chippewa Falls. Stayed at the Holiday Inn in La Crosse. Interviewed by Frank Sesno at La Crosse County Republican Party headquarters.

== November ==
State or country	Areas visited	Dates	Details
Michigan	Auburn Hills	November 1	Spoke at The Palace of Auburn Hills.
Connecticut	Stratford	November 1	Spoke at Sikorsky Memorial Airport.
New Jersey	Madison	November 1–2	Spoke at the Hartley Dodge Memorial Building.
Pennsylvania	Glenolden	November 2	Addressed the Briarcliffe Father & Sons Athletic Association.
Ohio	Akron	November 2	Spoke at Akron–Canton Airport.
Kentucky	Louisville	November 2	Spoke at Standiford Field.
Louisiana	Baton Rouge	November 2	Spoke at Baton Rouge Metropolitan Airport.
Texas	Houston	November 2–4	Spoke at the Astroarena. Voted in the 1992 United States presidential election at St. Mary's Seminary. Attended election night receptions at the Houstonian Hotel and the Westin Galleria.
Florida	Boca Grande	November 11–15	Vacation.
Connecticut	Greenwich	November 19	Visited the home of his mother, Dorothy Wear Walker Bush, who died later that day.
Connecticut	Greenwich	November 23	Attended the funeral of his mother, Dorothy Wear Walker Bush, at Christ Church.

== December ==
State or country	Areas visited	Dates	Details
Texas	College Station	December 15	Attended a meeting of the George H. W. Bush Presidential Library and Museum board. Spoke at Texas A&M University's G. Rollie White Coliseum.
Texas	Beeville	December 27–29	Went quail hunting on William Stamps Farish III's Lazy 'F' Ranch.
Saudi Arabia	Riyadh	December 31	Met with King Fahd.
Somalia	Mogadishu, Baidoa, Baledogle Airfield	December 31–January 2	Visited international relief workers and U.S. military personnel.

== January 1993 ==
State or country	Areas visited	Dates	Details
Russia	Moscow	January 2–3	Signed the second Strategic Arms Reduction Treaty.
France	Paris	January 3–5	Discussed the Bosnian crisis with President François Mitterrand.
New York	West Point	January 5	Spoke at the United States Military Academy mess hall.
