= United Gas Corporation =

American defunct oil company

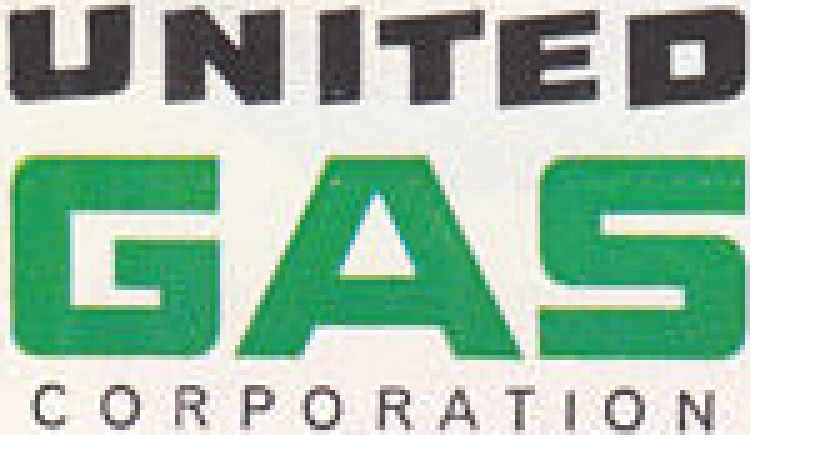
- "Serving the Gulf South"
- Company type: Public company
- Industry: Petroleum
- Founded: Shreveport, Louisiana (March 29, 1930)
- Founder: N.C. McGowen
- Defunct: April 1, 1968
- Fate: Acquired (December 17, 1965)
- Successor: Pennzoil
- Headquarters: Shreveport, Louisiana
- Area served: Gulf South
- Key people: N.C. McGowen (Chairman); Edmundson Parkes (President, CEO)
- Products: natural gas, condensate, gasoline, petroleum products, gold, silver, copper, potash, and sulphur
- Subsidiaries: Atlas Processing Company; Duval Corporation; UGC Instruments; United Gas Pipeline Company; Union Producing Company

United Gas Corporation was a major oil company from its inception in 1930 to its hostile takeover and subsequent forced merger with Pennzoil in 1968. Headquartered in Shreveport, Louisiana, United and its major subsidiaries, Union Producing Company, United Gas Pipeline Company, Atlas Processing, UGC Instruments, and Duval Mining, performed integrated exploration, production, processing, and distribution of oil and natural gas and other raw materials. Second only to Gulf Oil in size and scope, United Gas was one of the first natural gas transmission companies. In 1968, United was merged into Pennzoil, and the firm was renamed Pennzoil United, Inc. The retail gas distribution assets of United were spun off into Entex Energy in 1970. United Gas Pipeline stock was distributed to Pennzoil shareholders in 1974, and that company was eventually restructured as United Energy Resources, Inc., which was, in turn, acquired by Midcon Corporation.

Through purchase of Benson-Lehner Corporation of Van Nuys, California, and the Telecomputing Services (TSI) product line of the Whittaker's Data Instruments, North Hollywood, California, which became its fully owned subsidiaries, United Gas was engaged in missile business and various other defense activities related to the U.S. aerospace industry. In particular, it operated data processing centers for military and civil government agencies, including White Sands Missile Range missile test data analyzing, provided processing services for Strategic Air Command 1st Missile Division at Vandenberg Air Force Base, etc.

At the time of its takeover by Pennzoil, United operated the busiest pipeline network in the United States, carrying 8% of the nation's supply, and was eight times the size of its buyer. The dramatic takeover, accomplished by a cash tender offer using vast amounts of borrowed money and United's own assets as collateral, was the first of its kind in the United States, and, together with the subsequent asset spin-off, the event is a classic example of the leveraged buyout and corporate raid and resulted in numerous lawsuits and regulatory investigations.

== Early history and beginnings ==
The earliest company making up what would be United Gas Corporation entered Shreveport prior to 1915 as The Palmer Corporation of Shreveport, owned by Honore and Potter Palmer of Chicago. The Palmer Corporation sent 22-year-old Canadian Norris Cochran "N.C." McGowen to Shreveport to manage its gas wells and short pipeline to Shreveport. McGowen set to work in Vivian, Louisiana. By 1916, McGowen, still operating on behalf of the Palmer Corporation, secured control of a number properties in the newly discovered Monroe Gas Field. McGowen continued to add smaller companies, culminating in the merger of the Palmer Corporation and Electric Power & Light to form the Louisiana Gas and Fuel Company, now having operations in Texas and Mississippi, among other states. Louisiana Gas and Fuel was still, however, a subsidiary of the much larger Electric Bond and Share Company, a company McGowen rapidly rose through the ranks of.

== United Gas Corporation is born ==
Edmundson Parkes would join the company in 1928. Then, between 1928 and 1930, McGowen and Parkes combined the assets of five major groups, representing more than 40 power, fuel and utility companies, to form a holding company christened the United Gas Corporation on June 30, 1930.

United next entered the Jackson Gas Field, soon controlling most of the gas in that play and recognizing in the Field a cheap source of gas for Mississippi, Alabama, and Florida. Through subsidiaries, United began entering and dominating more markets south of Jackson, building out its pipeline along the way. In 1931, in the midst of the Great Depression, United's efforts ended with a monopoly of the Jackson Gas Field, having bought all of Gulf Refining Company's rights, including gas wells and over 14,000 acres of leases for $500,000 and the smaller Pearl Valley Oil & Gas Company's Jackson assets. Now positioned atop the heap and with ready access to cheap natural gas, United offered to buy the Southern Natural Pipeline at considerably below market value. With no way to compete, Southern was forced to sell. United's purchase included miles of pipeline stretching from Jackson, Mississippi to Mobile, Alabama, with an extension to Pensacola, Florida under construction.

The company continued to add assets and expand until 1937 when the many entities owned by United Gas were reorganized to form Union Producing Company for exploration and production, Atlas Processing for refining, United Gas Pipeline Company for long-distance transmission, and parent, United Gas Corporation, as the distributor for cities.

Through mergers with eight other companies, Atlas Processing Company became one of the largest refineries in the Southern United States. The plant is still operational in Shreveport today. The company also developed extensive mines and technology through its subsidiaries, Duval Corporation, a miner and miller of copper, potash, sulphur and other materials, and UGC Instruments, a manufacturer of electronic devices primarily used in the oil and gas industry. The company's crown jewel, however, was the extensive pipeline network built out and maintained by United Gas Pipeline Company.

== Rapid rise ==
In the 1930s, an FTC investigation revealed that four dominant holding companies controlled 60% of natural gas produced and 58% of total pipeline mileage. One of these big four companies was the United Gas Corporation. On January 19, 1940, United Gas Pipe Line Company became the first pipeline company to handle 1,000,000,000 cubic feet of natural gas in one day.

United proved to be a pioneer in the gas delivery industry. To provide raw supplies to its markets, United and its pipeline contractors pioneered the construction of natural-gas gathering lines across marshlands and open water. In 1941, United Gas and Houston firm, Brown & Root built the first large-diameter submarine pipeline, spanning 25 miles across Lake Pontchartrain, near New Orleans. The techniques employed by United and Brown & Root became industry standard. United then turned its attention offshore, extending its pipeline to Eugene Island south of St. Mary Parish.

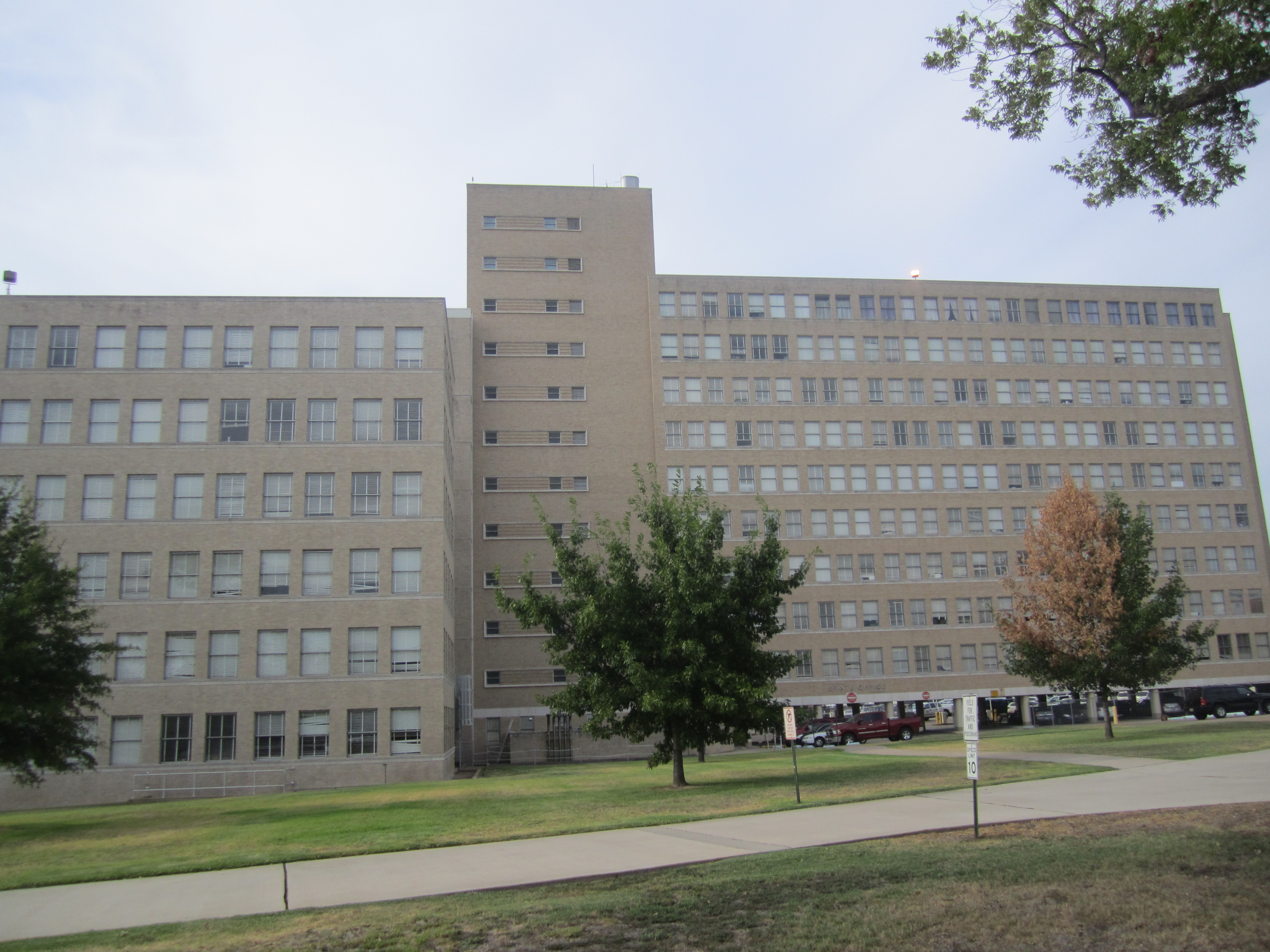
The Louisiana State Office Building in Shreveport was originally the headquarters of the former United Gas Corporation.

The Post-World War II era saw United's rise accelerate, as regional markets for cheap natural gas appeared and expanded. By 1947, United Gas was the largest gas company in the Southwest. In that same year, several United employees left the company to form Texas Eastern Transmission Co., including manager, Reginald Hargrove, general counsel, George Naff, and assistant chief engineer, Baxter Goodrich. Texas Eastern became a dominant pipeline player in its own right, and, in exchange for releasing the employees, United was guaranteed another market for its gas production and supply. The close relationship between the two companies would interest the Justice Department over the ensuing years. Hargrove would ultimately perish in a tragic airplane accident, occurring when a seaplane owned by United Gas crashed into the treetops outside of Shreveport during the return from a three-day duck hunting trip hosted by United Gas. The crash killed 12 people, including six prominent Shreveporters and Dallas resident Thomas E. Braniff, president of Braniff Airways. Shreveport leaders killed in the crash were Hargrove, financier Justin R. Querbes, Sr., Interstate Electric President Randolph Querbes, Sr., Atlas Processing Chairman John B. Atkins, Sr., Goldring’s Vice President E. Bernard Weiss, and independent oil producer J.P. Evans.

Henry Goodrich, another United Gas alumnus employed by subsidiary Union Producing as an exploration geologist, would go on to form Goodrich Petroleum Corporation.

On July 6, 1949, United Gas Corporation was listed on the New York Stock Exchange, with an initial listing of 10,700,000 shares. By the early 1950s, United Gas owned and operated an extensive pipeline system stretching across the Gulf South. Annual reports indicated that, in 1953, United owned and operated more than 9,000 field and transmission lines that distributed more than 800,000,000,000 cubic feet of natural gas annually to 309 cities, towns, and communities. Of the approximately 18 pipeline systems built in the region, United owned five.

== Entrance of Pennzoil and demise ==
Pennzoil was founded in Los Angeles, California, in 1913. In 1955, it was acquired by Oil City, Pennsylvania, company South Penn Oil, a former branch of Standard Oil. In 1963, South Penn Oil merged with Zapata Petroleum, a company founded by brothers, William Liedtke, Jr. and J. Hugh Liedtke, Thomas J. Devine, and future U.S. President George H. W. Bush. The merged company took the Pennzoil name.

Through business associates, Hugh Liedtke became aware of United Gas, by 1965 the nation's busiest pipeline operator, conveying 3 billion cubic feet of natural gas (3.2×10^{9} MJ) across the country every day, making up 8% of the nation's supply. In researching the company, Liedtke also discovered United's vast oil reserves and large deposits of copper, sulphur, and other materials. United was, however, eight times the size of the fledgling Pennzoil.

Undaunted, Pennzoil began slowly accumulating shares of United Gas on the open market. By October 1965, Pennzoil owned 275,000 shares of United common stock which it had acquired under an investment program initiated in May 1965. Word of a possible takeover leaked, however, and shares of United Gas soared. Then, Pennzoil hit upon a method for acquiring United in one fell swoop, the cash tender offer, a practice unheard of in the United States but widely used in the United Kingdom. The move would cement the Liedtkes' legacy in the oil and gas industry, and result in Bush's Pennzoil stock increasing in value 10,000%.

Accordingly, on November 22, 1965, Pennzoil made a public offer to the United common stockholders to purchase a minimum of 1,000,000 shares of United common stock at $41 per share. As of that date, United was selling at $35.75 on the open market. Liedtke, according to The Wall Street Journal, waited until the day before Thanksgiving to make the unwelcome offer, "knowing that many United executives would be off for the long weekend duck hunting".

United's management was indeed caught off guard, and, although leadership advised against the tender, the response to the Pennzoil offer was much greater than anticipated. By December 7, 1965, 4,982,096 out of the 12,868,982 shares outstanding had been tendered to Pennzoil, with additional shares continuing to be tendered. Because of the volume of shares tendered, Pennzoil was forced to arrange over $200,000,000 in debt financing, using United's own assets as collateral. When the dust cleared, and although United fought Pennzoil every step of the way, Pennzoil owned 42% of United Gas Corporation with well over $1,000,000,000 in revenues. The takeover was cited as a textbook example of a corporate raid and was described as "an aggressive Lilliputian capturing a sleeping giant," and "the minnow swallowing the whale.

== Aftermath ==
Pennzoil then deposed the old board of directors of both United Gas Corporation and its wholly owned subsidiary, United Gas Pipeline Company, appointing Hugh Liedtke as chairman of the board and William Liedtke as chairman of the executive committee. The executive committee consisted of Messrs. Boviard, Everett, Haslanger, Kerr, Hugh Liedtke, William Liedtke, and Edmundson Parkes. These new board members, most of whom were also directors of Pennzoil, constituted a majority of both boards. From that point on, Pennzoil exercised ultimate control over the actions of United Gas Corporation and United Gas Pipeline Company. In April 1968, Pennzoil compelled a merger of United and Pennzoil, forming Pennzoil United, Inc. In December 1968 Pennzoil forced United Gas Pipeline Company to pay a dividend of $51,000,000 to its new owner.

Pennzoil proceeded to sell off most of United's assets, first spinning off its retail business and then, in 1974, the huge United Gas Pipe Line Company. The Liedtkes' handling of the affair resulted in a barrage of lawsuits and an investigation by the Federal Power Commission.

The absorption of the United companies turned Pennzoil into a large and diversified natural-resources company. Its 1970 sales hit $700 million, up tenfold from 1963, and its Duval Corporation mining subsidiary went on to make a series of quick strikes in sulphur, potash, copper, gold, and silver.
