= Edmundson Parkes =

American businessman (1904–1997)

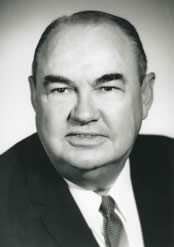
- Born: November 22, 1904; Jefferson County, Alabama
- Died: April 20, 1997 (aged 92); Shreveport, Louisiana
- Education: University of Arkansas
- Occupations: Engineer, Geologist
- Known for: United Gas Corporation
- Title: President, CEO

Edmundson Parkes (1904-1997) was President and CEO of United Gas Corporation, a major oil company from its inception in 1930 to its hostile takeover and subsequent forced merger with Pennzoil in 1968. He was one of the lone holdovers when Pennzoil convened a new board of directors to manage the company and its subsidiaries.

Parkes was born in 1904 in Jefferson County, Alabama to Major William J. Parkes and Elmira Melissa Huey. Parkes' father was a former commandant of the University of Alabama and captain in the Alabama State Militia who raised a troop to fight for Teddy Roosevelt in the Spanish–American War. Parkes was named for his grandmother, Mary Edmundson, herself a granddaughter of George A. Wilson, a former Grand Master of the Grand Lodge of Tennessee Freemasons. Parkes graduated from the University of Arkansas in 1925. He worked his way through the ranks of the United Gas Corporation, starting with what would become a company subsidiary in 1928. After several promotions, he was named president of United Gas Pipeline Company and Union Producing Company. He was named president and CEO of the parent corporation, United Gas, in 1958. He was a past president of the American Gas Association, and served as chairman of the Committee on Natural Gas Reserves of A.G.A. He was also active in a number of professional and civic organizations.

He married Julia Alice Washburn of Monroe, Louisiana, and had two daughters, Myra and Ruth, of Shreveport. The former married Dr. Paul Winder, also of Shreveport, and had issue. Parkes' wife was a direct descendant of Myles Standish, as was the wife of Parkes' rival and Pennzoil founder, George H. W. Bush.
