= Liedtke =

Liedtke is a German surname. Variants: Lüdtke, Luedtke, Liedke. Notable people with the surname include:

- Antonina Liedtke, Polish science fiction writer
- Bill Liedtke (1924–1991), American oilman, co-founder and president of Pennzoil
- Harry Liedtke (1882–1945), German actor
- J. Hugh Liedtke (1922–2003), American oilman, co-founder of Pennzoil who won the largest jury verdict in tort law history, brother of Bill Liedtke
- Jochen Liedtke (1953–2001), German computer scientist
- Max Liedtke (1894–1955), German journalist and army officer who protected Jews from the Holocaust
- Rainer Liedtke (1943–2012), German physician, scientist and entrepreneur
- Ulrike Liedtke (born 1958), German musicologist and politician
- Walter Liedtke (1945–2015), American art historian, writer and museum curator
