= Quaker State =

American motor oil brand

- Formerly: Quaker State Oil Production Company (1924–1931); Quaker State Corporation (1931–1990); Quaker State Oil Production Corporation (1990–1998); Pennzoil and Quaker State (1998–2002)
- Company type: Brand of Phinny Brothers Oil Company (1912–1924); Private (1924–1998); Brand (1998–present)
- Industry: Petroleum
- Founded: (Brand): 1912 by Phinny Brothers Oil Co. (Company): 1924
- Founder: T.G. Phinny
- Defunct: 1998; 27 years ago
- Fate: Merged to Pennzoil to form "Pennzoil-Quaker State". It was acquired by Shell USA in 2002, remaining as a brand
- Headquarters: Houston, Texas, United States
- Products: Motor oils
- Owner: Shell USA
- Number of employees: 7,400 (2002)
- Website: quakerstate.com

Quaker State is an American brand of motor oils, owned by Shell USA, the US-based division of Shell plc.

The former Quaker State Oil Refining Company had been constituted in 1924 after the Eastern Refining Co. acquired rights to the Quaker State brand name to the Phinny Brothers Oil Company, which had been producing the Quaker lubricants since 1912, gaining reputation in the U.S. after a deal signed with automotive manufacturer Franklin in 1914. In 1931, it became the "Quaker State Corporation" after merging with another 18 oil companies. In 2002, Shell acquired Pennzoil-Quaker State for $1.8 billion in cash and $1.1 billion in debt.

The Quaker State name is derived from the nickname for Pennsylvania, the state founded by William Penn, an adherent of the Quaker religion.

The Pennzoil-Quaker State brands are sold under SOPUS Products with the address of Shell's office in Houston, Texas.

== History ==
=== Brand background ===
Quaker State's origins may be traced to the founding of Oil City in Pennsylvania, in the 19th century. The petroleum industry of the city brought prosperity, increasing its population from 12 families in 1860 to 6,000 five years later. The name "Quaker State" was adopted in 1912 when T.G. Phinny (owner of the Phinny Brothers Oil Company) used it to distinguish his products from competitors. One of the first goals of the company was to provide lubricants for Franklin Automotive Company of Syracuse, New York, signing a contract to become exclusive oil provider for the company.

By 1915, Quaker State advertised in The Saturday Evening Post becoming a known brand in the U.S.

"The Franklin requirements were severe. Many oils were tested, but Quaker State alone met these requirements." The notice then went on to explain Quaker State's unique attributes, and asked Franklin owners to ask their nearest dealer for the product. It concluded: "Quaker State is certified and guaranteed to be the highest known quality oil suitable for every engine purpose. It prolongs the life of the motor. Will not burn before lubricating. Gives practically double mileage. Prevents engine overheating. Cuts oil bills."

— Quaker State advertisement in The Saturday Evening Post, 1915

=== Company formation ===
In 1924, the Eastern Refining Company" purchased the Quaker State brand name to rename itself "Quaker State Oil Refining Company". On July 1, 1931, the "Quaker State Corporation" was formed when Charles Pape, stockbroker from Chicago, brought 19 regional oil companies, offering them 55,000 shares in the new corporation that resulted after they merge their business. Some of the companies involved were the Eastern Refining Company, Sterling Oil Company of West Virginia, Ohio Valley Refining Company, Enterprise Oil Company Inc., Independent Refining Company, Lake Erie Lubricants Inc., Iron City Oil Company, Gallagher Bros. Inc., and Appaline Oil Company.

Herry Crawford (former president of the 'President Oil Company') become president of the recently formed Quaker State. During its first year, the company ran up $6.8 million in sales. In 1936, the company signed an agreement with the Standard Oil Company becoming its exclusive sales agent for its oil products in 13 Midwestern states. Standard would later put all Quaker State products in its filling stations. Until 1944, Quaker State did not drill oil but it bought crude from other producers, nevertheless the increasing demand for energy during wartime led the company to buy drilling facilities from the Forest Oil Company in Bradford to produce its own crude oil.

=== Expansion ===
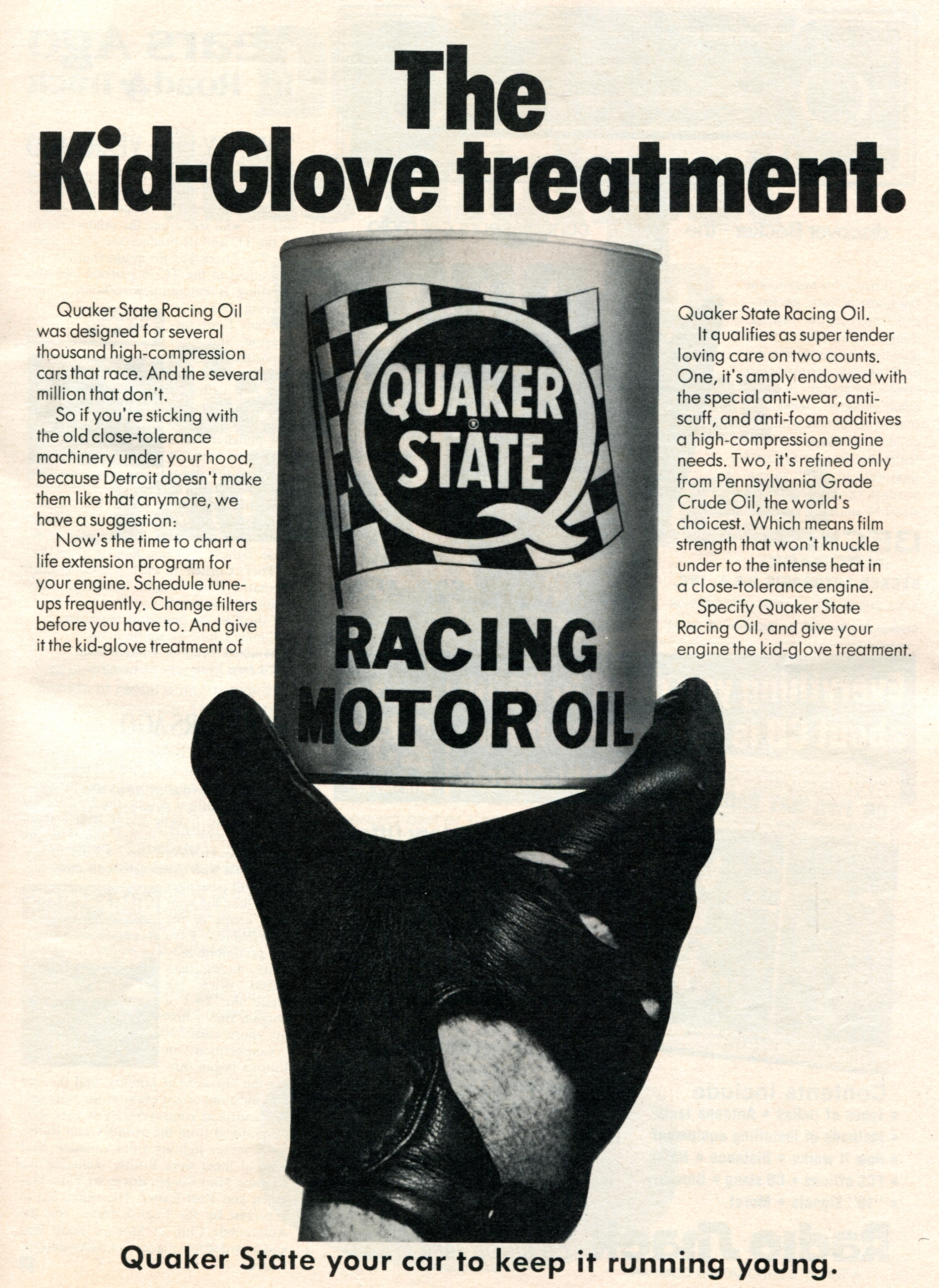
1976 Quaker State ad

By 1960, company's sales surpassed the $50 million. In 1964 Quaker State purchased the Truck-Lite Company of Falconer, New York, to diversify its business. The top sales for the company came in the 1970s, when it had profits of $10.7 million. Quaker State opened a new refinery in Newell, West Virginia, that allowed the company to reach sales of $300 million in 1975. During the following years, Quaker State acquired the Valley Camp Coal Co (1976) and new headquarters on Elm Street in Oil City, also buying car parts suppliers, Corn Brothers of Smyrna, Georgia; National Oil Company of Newark, New Jersey; and Texstar Automotive Corporation, based in St. Louis, Missouri.

In the 1980s, Quaker State continued its expansion with the acquisitions of the Heritage Insurance Group (an insurance company), Helen Mining Company (coal producer), and shares to Minit-Lube Inc. to offer car maintenance services.

=== Acquisition and bankruptcy ===
In 1989, the company reorganized itself into five divisions, including the refining corporation, car maintenance, insurance, trucks, and energy. This operation brought a decrease in sales and profits. In January 1990, the Quaker State Corporation's petroleum business split from the parent company, giving the name "Quaker State Oil Refining Corporation". Months later, Quaker State sold some of its facilities. By 1991, the motor oil business produced 92% of profits for the company, while all other sectors were losing money or barely profitable.

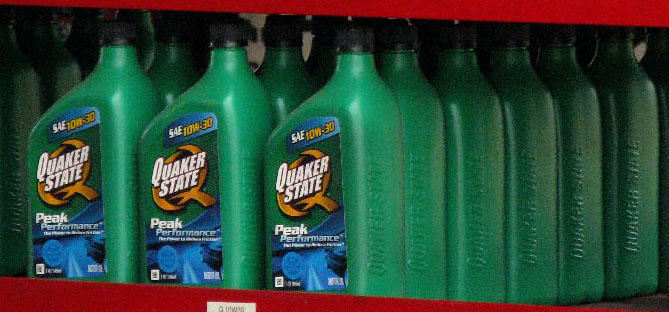
Quaker Motor oil bottles at a store in 2009

By 1992, sales had dropped to $724 million (more than 25%). In 1994, Quaker State sold its insurance business and purchased Speciality Oil Corp. for $90 million. In 1995, the company announced that it would move to Dallas and sell its natural gas business to focus on lubricants.

In 1998, Quaker State was acquired by rival company Pennzoil, becoming "Pennzoil-Quaker State Company". In 2002, Shell Oil Company (the US-based subsidiary of Royal Dutch Shell) acquired Pennzoil-Quaker State. At the moment of the purchase, Pennzoil-Quaker was the largest motor oil manufacturer in the United States. On the other side, Shell expected to become leader in the U.S. and global lubricants markets.

== Sponsorship ==
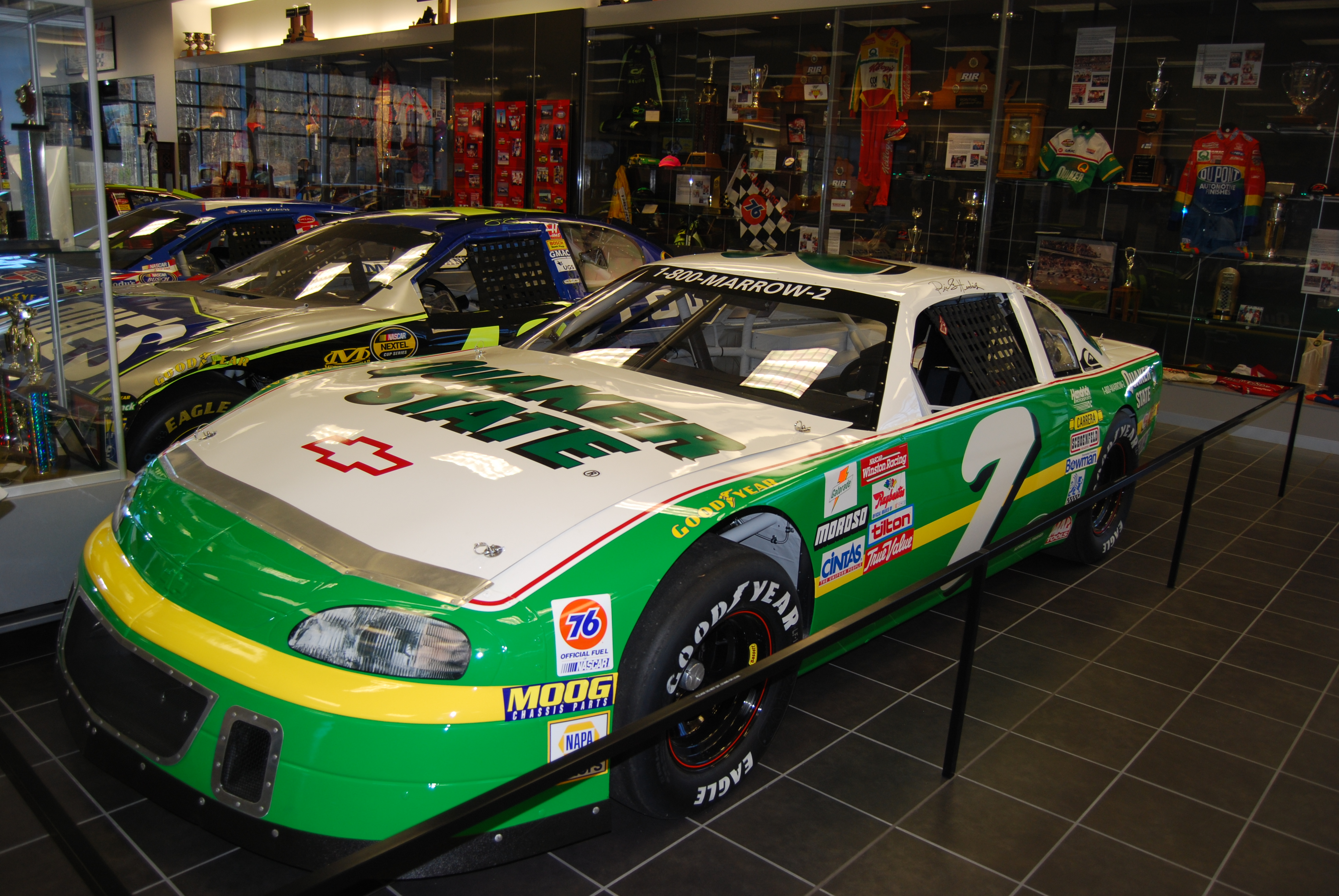
NASCAR's Chevrolet Monte Carlo sponsored by Quaker State

The former Pennzoil-Quaker State Company sponsored the IndyCar race, Quaker State 500 (now known as the ABC Supply 500) in 1988, and is a current sponsor of the NASCAR Cup Series race Quaker State 400 at Atlanta Motor Speedway.

Quaker State was also the sponsor of Hendrick Motorsports from 1996 to 2013 (Jeff Gordon, Jimmie Johnson, Dale Earnhardt Jr., Kasey Kahne) and Paul Menard; the company was also formerly the sponsor of Morgan Shepherd. Quaker State was also official lubricants partner of Italo-American Ferrari-works team Risi Competizione in 2004 until 2008. Quaker State was sponsoring the Force India Formula One team for 2015 until 2018 and Allen "Quaker" Ellis for the 2016 US National Olympic Team.

The restaurant chain Quaker Steak & Lube is a spoof on the brand name.

== See also ==
- Windmill Quaker State
