= Littke =

Littke is a surname. Notabe people with the surname include:

- Lael Littke, American writer
- Marianne Littke (born 1965), Swedish politician

== See also ==
- Litke (disambiguation)
- Liedtke
