= Cambern Dutch Shop Windmill =

- U.S. National Register of Historic Places
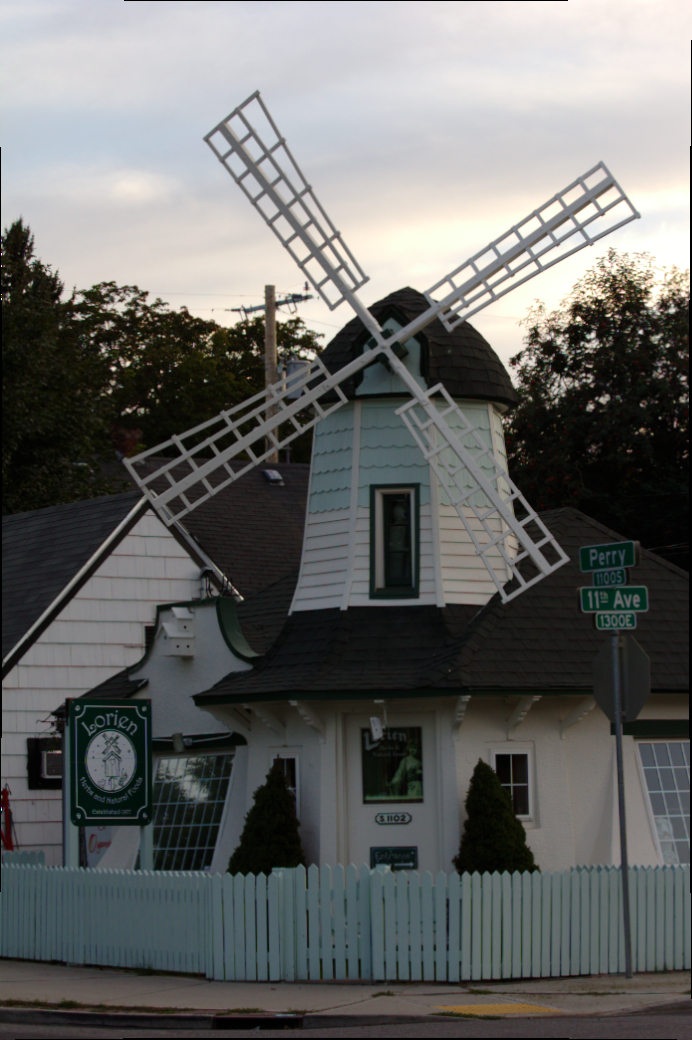

- Location within Spokane riverfront area
- Location: Spokane, Washington
- Coordinates: 47°38′43.1″N 117°23′24.7″W
- Built: 1929
- Architect: Charles Wood
- NRHP reference No.: 89000213
- Added to NRHP: March 16, 1989

Cambern Dutch Shop Windmill is a historic commercial building constructed in the shape of a windmill at 1102 S. Perry in Spokane, Washington, United States. It was built in 1929 and added to the National Register of Historic Places in 1989.

The building is located in the South Perry District of the East Central neighborhood. It is located along Perry Street in a commercial district which serves the immediate and wider neighborhoods. As of 2022 the building is home to Lorien Herbs and Natural Foods.

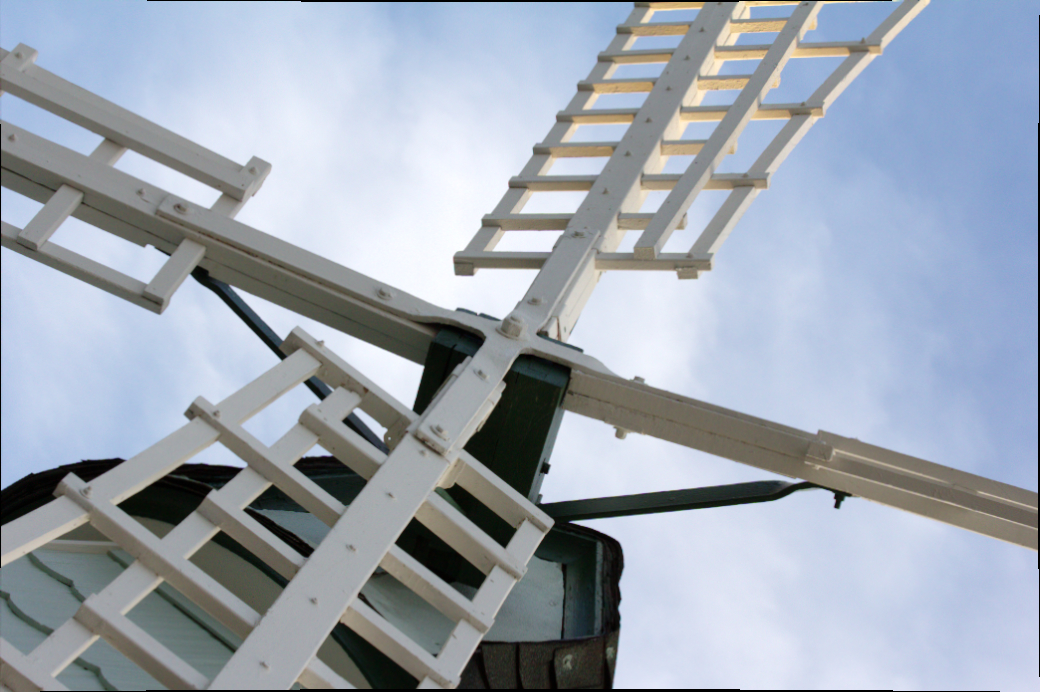
Close up of the blades

== See also ==
- Windmill Quaker State: On the NRHP in West Virginia
