= Luedtke =

Lüdtke or Luedtke is a German surname. Variants: Liedtke, Liedke. Notable people with the surname include:

- Alf Lüdtke (1943–2019), German historian
- Eric Luedtke, American politician
- Hans Luedtke
- Howard Luedtke, American singer-songwriter
- Kurt Luedtke (1939–2020), American screenwriter and newspaper editor
- Luther Luedtke
- Melissa Ludtke, American journalist
- Paul A. Luedtke, American politician
- Roland Luedtke (1924–2005), American politician
