= Litke =

Litke may refer to:

== People ==
- Fyodor Litke (1797–1882), Russian count, geographer, explorer
- Raymond A. Litke (1920-1986), American electronics engineer

== Place names ==
- Litke (crater), a lunar impact crater in the large walled plain Fermi
- Litke, Hungary, a village in Hungary
- Litke Deep, an oceanic trench in the Arctic Ocean
- Litke Strait
- Litke Nunatak

== See also ==
- Littke
