= Windmill Quaker State =

- U.S. National Register of Historic Places
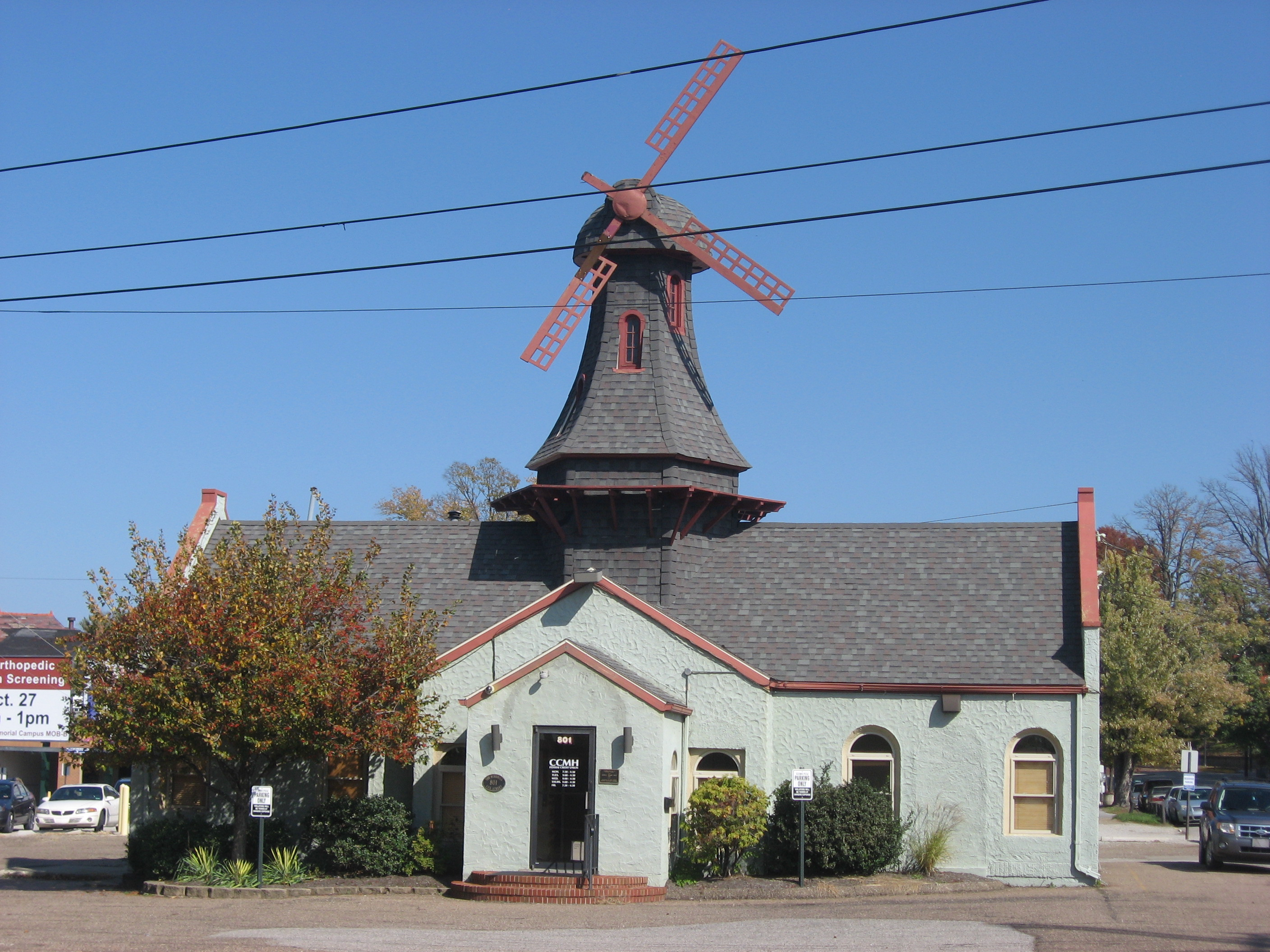
- Front of the building

- Location within West Virginia Location within the United States
- Location: 800 Murdoch Ave., Parkersburg, West Virginia
- Coordinates: 39°16′11″N 81°33′31″W
- Area: less than one acre
- Built: 1928
- Architect: Glen Reynolds; George Nichols
- MPS: Downtown Parkersburg MRA
- NRHP reference No.: 82001795
- Added to NRHP: October 8, 1982

Windmill Quaker State is a historic service station located at Parkersburg, Wood County, West Virginia. It was built in 1928 by the Quaker State Corporation, and is an example of an architectural folly. It is a roughcast stucco building with a windmill atop the gable roof.

It was listed on the National Register of Historic Places in 1982.

== See also ==
- Cambern Dutch Shop Windmill: on the NRHP in Washington (state)
- National Register of Historic Places listings in Wood County, West Virginia
