= Baine Kerr =

American lawyer

- Born: August 24, 1919; Houston
- Died: May 20, 2008 (aged 88); Houston
- Education: Juris Doctor
- Alma mater: University of Texas at Austin; San Jacinto High School
- Occupation: Lawyer, businessperson
- Employer: Baker Botts; Pennzoil
- Position held: president
- Rank: senior lieutenant, major
- Branch: United States Marine Corps

Baine Perkins Kerr (August 24, 1919 – May 20, 2008) was a prominent Houston lawyer who was a partner in the law firm of Baker and Botts, where he managed the corporate law department, before he joined Pennzoil.

== Career ==
Kerr was president of Pennzoil and on the board of directors from 1964 to 1994. He served in World War II, and graduated from the University of Texas at Austin. He married Mildred C. Kerr in 1942, with whom he would raise four children, Baine P. Kerr, Jr., John Caldwell Kerr, James Robinson Kerr, and Mary Kerr.

In the 1980s he served on the "Energy Engineering Board" of the National Research Council.

In 1989 he was paid a $10 million bonus for his work on a lawsuit for Pennzoil that resulted in a $3 billion settlement from Texaco.

== Friendship with George Bush ==
Kerr and his family were longtime friends of George H. W. Bush and his wife, Barbara, whom they used to live down the street from. According to an article by Walter Pincus and Bob Woodward in The Washington Post entitled Doing Well with Help from Family, Friends, (August 11, 1988) when Bush was running against Lloyd Bentsen for senator in 1970, Kerr advised Bush on a proposed business deal involving a loan request from a man named Victor Flaherty, who needed money to buy Fidelity Printing Company. Kerr recommended that Bush make the loan, but that he also demand some stock in Fidelity Printing as part of the deal. When Fidelity Printing was sold, Bush cashed in his stock for $99,600 in profit, a gain of 1,900 percent on his original investment. When Bush became president he named his presidential yacht "Fidelity" because of this business deal.
