= Bill Liedtke =

American lawyer and petroleum executive

William C. Liedtke
- Born: September 27, 1924; Tulsa, Oklahoma, U.S.
- Died: March 1, 1991 (aged 66); Houston, Texas, U.S.
- Education: Amherst College, (BA); University of Texas School of Law (LLB)
- Occupations: oil executive, attorney
- Known for: co-founder of Pennzoil
- Spouse: Bessie Johns Smith Liedtke (m. 1949)
- Children: 4

William C. Liedtke Jr. (/ˈlɪtki/ LIT-kee; September 27, 1924 — March 1, 1991) was an American petroleum executive, best known as the co-founder of Pennzoil with his older brother J. Hugh Liedtke.

== Early life ==
Liedtke was born in Tulsa, Oklahoma where his father was an attorney for the Gulf Oil Corporation. During World War II, he and his brother, Hugh, served in the South Pacific as junior officers in the United States Navy. They met on Saipan and agreed to pursue a business career together if they survived the war.

Liedtke earned a B.A. from Amherst College in 1945 and an LL.B. from University of Texas School of Law in 1949. He moved to Midland, Texas, then opened a law practice with Hugh in 1949.

== Oil executive ==
In the 1950s, Hugh and Bill Liedtke had an office next to that of the Bush-Overbey Oil Development Company run by future United States President George H. W. Bush and Bush's neighbor, John Overbey. In 1950s, the Liedtke's, Bush, and Overbey formed the Zapata Petroleum Corporation. Zapata eventually merged with Pennzoil, and the Liedtkes took over United Gas Pipeline in 1956.

Liedtke served as the president of Pennzoil from 1967 to 1977. In 1977, he left Pennzoil to lead the company's spin-off Pogo Producing Company. Previously known as Pennzoil Offshore Gas Operators at its IPO in 1970, Pogo was an exploration and production subsidiary of Pennzoil set up to look for natural gas in the Gulf of Mexico. Liedtke served as the chairman, director, CEO and president of Pogo until his retirement in 1991.

== Politics ==
Liedtke became the Texas finance chairman for Richard Nixon's Presidential campaigns in 1968 and 1972. In September 1972, columnist Jack Anderson obtained a report compiled by the House Banking Committee indicating that Liedtke admitted to investigators that he had raised $100,000 in Mexico for Nixon's campaign fund.

Liedtke later served on the Board of Trustees for Amherst College. He also served as finance chair for Victory 88 Oklahoma, an organization which supported the Bush-Quayle campaign of 1988.

His son, William C. Liedtke III was nominated by President Bush in May 1992 for a seat on the five-member Federal Energy Regulatory Commission.
