= HRG Group =

American company

HRG Group, Inc.
- Traded as: NYSE: HRG; Russell 2000 Component
- Founded: 1999
- Defunct: July 13, 2018
- Revenue: ▼US$5.2 billion (2017)
- Number of employees: 16,021

HRG Group, Inc., formerly Harbinger Group Inc. and Zapata Corporation, was a holding company based in Rochester, New York, having originated from an oil company started by a group including former U.S. president George H. W. Bush. In 2009, it was renamed the Harbinger Group Inc. In July 2018, the company completed a merger with Spectrum Brands, which it was a controlling shareholder of, and the HRG Group name was discontinued.

== Early business history ==
The company traced its origins to Zapata Petroleum Corporation, founded in 1953 by future U.S. president George H. W. Bush, along with his business partners John Overbey, Hugh Liedtke, Bill Liedtke, and Thomas J. Devine. Overbey was a landman skilled in scouting oil fields and obtaining drilling rights cheaply. Bush and Thomas J. Devine were oil-wildcatting associates. Their joint activities culminated in the establishment of Zapata Oil. The company was named for Viva Zapata!, a 1952 biographical film starring Marlon Brando as Mexican revolutionary Emiliano Zapata. The initial $1 million (equivalent to $12,000,000 in 2025) investment for Zapata was provided by the Liedtke brothers and their circle of investors, by Bush's father Prescott Bush and his maternal grandfather George Herbert Walker, and their family's circle of friends. Hugh Liedtke was named president, Bush was vice president; Overbey soon left.

According to a CIA internal memo dated November 29, 1975, Zapata Petroleum began in 1953 through Bush's joint efforts with Thomas J. Devine, a CIA staffer who had resigned his agency position that same year to go into private business, but who continued to work for the CIA under commercial cover. Devine would later accompany Bush to Vietnam in late 1967 as a "cleared and witting commercial asset" of the agency, acted as his informal foreign affairs advisor, and had a close relationship with him through 1975.

In 1954, Zapata Off-Shore Company was formed as a subsidiary of Zapata Oil, with Bush as president of the new company. He raised some startup money from Eugene Meyer, publisher of the Washington Post, and his son-in-law, Philip Graham.

Zapata Off-Shore accepted an offer from an inventor, R. G. LeTourneau, for the development of a mobile but secure drilling rig. Zapata advanced him $400,000, which was to be refundable if the completed rig did not function, followed by an additional $550,000 together with 38,000 shares of Zapata Off-Shore common stock when it did.

The U.S. government began to auction off mineral rights to the Caribbean, the Gulf of Mexico, and islands off the Central American coast in 1954, and in the late 1950s and early 1960, Zapata Off-Shore concentrated its business in these areas. In 1958, drilling contracts with the seven largest U.S. oil producers included wells 40 miles (64 km) north of Isabela, Cuba, near the island Cay Sal.

In 1959 Bush bought control of Zapata Off-Shore, funded with $800,000, splitting Zapata Corporation into two independent companies with the Liedtkes still in control of Zapata Petroleum. Bush moved his offices and family that year from Midland, Texas to Houston for access to the Caribbean through the Houston Ship Channel. But although Zapata Offshore had only a few drilling rigs, Bush set up operations also in the Gulf of Mexico, the Persian Gulf, Trinidad, Borneo, and Medellín, Colombia, and the Kuwait Shell Petroleum Development Company was among the company's clients.

In 1960, Jorge Díaz Serrano of Mexico was put in touch with Bush by Dresser Industries. Dresser was owned by Prescott Bush's Yale friends Roland and W. Averell Harriman, and had been George H.W. Bush's first employer upon his graduation from Yale, giving him his start in both the oil business and the defense contractor business. Serrano and Bush created a new company, Perforaciones Marinas del Golfo, aka Permargo, in conjunction with Edwin Pauley of Pan American Petroleum, with whom Zapata had a previous offshore contract. The deal with Permargo is not mentioned in Zapata's annual reports, and SEC records are missing. In 1988, a Bush spokesman claimed that the deal lasted only from March to September 1960. However, Zapata sold the oil-drilling rig Nola I to Pemargo in 1964.

Zapata's filing records with the U.S. Securities and Exchange Commission are intact for the years 1955–1959, and again from 1967 onwards. However, records for the years 1960–1966 are missing. The commission's records officer stated that the records were inadvertently placed in a session file to be destroyed by a federal warehouse, and that a total of 1,000 boxes were pulped in this procedure. The destruction of records occurred either in October 1983 (according to the records officer), or in 1981 shortly after Bush became Vice President of the United States (according to, Wison Carpenter, a record analyst with the commission).

During the Bay of Pigs invasion and the Cuban Missile Crisis, Zapata allowed its oil rigs to be used as listening posts. In 1988, Barron's said Zapata was "a part time purchasing front for the [Central Intelligence Agency]".

In 1962, Bush was joined in Zapata Off-Shore by Robert Gow. By 1963, Zapata Off-Shore had four operational oil-drilling rigs—Scorpion (from 1956, the first oil-drilling jackup rig ever built), Vinegaroon (from 1957), Sidewinder, and (in the Persian Gulf) Nola III.

In 1963, Zapata Petroleum merged with South Penn Oil to become Pennzoil.

By 1964, Zapata Off-Shore had a number of subsidiaries, including: Seacat-Zapata Offshore Company (Persian Gulf), Zapata de Mexico, Zapata International Corporation, Zapata Mining Corporation, Zavala Oil Company, Zapata Overseas Corporation, and a 41% share of Amata Gas Corporation.

In 1964, Bush ran for the United States Senate, and lost; he continued as president of Zapata Off-Shore until 1966, when he sold his interest to Doyle Mize and ran for the U.S. House of Representatives.

On September 9, 1965, Hurricane Betsy struck the coast of Louisiana sinking the oil rig Maverick. There were no deaths, however, $8 million in Zapata assets were lost. A helicopter flew Bush over the area for several days until debris was located. After evidence was submitted to Lloyd's of London for the loss, they paid Zapata for the claim.

In 1966, William Stamps Farish III, age 28, joined the board of Zapata.

== Decline ==
Zapata sought to acquire a controlling interest in the United Fruit Company in 1969, but was outbid by Eli M. Black's AMK Corp. Robert Gow's father, Ralph Gow, was on United Fruit's board of directors.

In the 1970s, under chairman and CEO William Flynn, Zapata expanded its business to include subsidiaries in dredging, construction, coal mining, copper mining and fishing.

By the late 1970s, saddled with weak operations, high debt and low return on investment, the company again began undergoing changes in management and direction. Led by John Mackin, who succeeded William Flynn, the company began selling off some of those businesses and refocused on offshore oil and gas exploration and production.

In 1982, chief operating officer Ronald Lassiter assumed the role of CEO, and presided over a decade of loss-making brought on by the collapse of oil prices. In 1982, Zapata Off-shore became Zapata Corporation. By 1986, Zapata was one of the bad loans that shook the foundations of San Francisco-based Bank of America, with a debt of more than $500 million and a fiscal year loss of $250 million. The company announced several restructurings during those years and managed to stave off bankruptcy, but continued to incur major losses. In 1990 the oil drilling company proposed selling its entire fleet of offshore drilling rigs to focus solely on fishing. The company had not had a profitable quarter in more than five years.

In 1990, Zapata Offshore sold 12 of its drilling rigs to Arethusa Offshore, which a few years later merged with Diamond Offshore. Still struggling with debt by 1993, Zapata signed a deal with Norex America to raise more than $100 million through a loan and stock sale. But financier Malcolm Glazer, owner of the NFL franchise Tampa Bay Buccaneers and Premier League club Manchester United, and at the time owner of 40 percent of Zapata, did not want his holdings diluted and filed a lawsuit to block the deal.

== Glazer era and the birth of Harbinger Group Inc. ==
By 1994, the company had come under Glazer's control, after a proxy fight. Glazer became chairman of Zapata, replacing Ronald Lassiter, and in 1995 Avram Glazer, son of Malcolm, was named CEO and president of Zapata. De facto headquarters moved from Houston to Rochester, New York. It no longer engaged in exploration, but owned several natural gas service companies. It also produced protein products from the menhaden fish. In subsequent years Zapata sold its energy-related businesses and focused on marine protein.

Between 1998 and 2000, Zapata tried to position itself as an internet media company under the "zap.com" name. In July 1998, Zapata announced its plans to acquire several web sites, including ChatPlanet, TravelPage and DailyStocks.com. The company's stock boomed and crashed along with other dot-coms, and on January 24, 2001 the company conducted a 1 for 10 reverse stock split. The venture was cited by many investment journalists as an example of a company jumping on the internet bandwagon without any relevant experience. This period is probably best remembered for Zapata's unsolicited (and unsuccessful) takeover bid of the Excite internet portal.

During this period, Zapata also built up a controlling stake in Safety Components International, a manufacturer of air bag fabrics and cushions.

On December 2, 2005, Zapata Corporation Chairman, Avram ("Avi") Glazer, announced the sale of 4,162,394 shares, 77.3%, of Safety Components International to Wilbur L. Ross Jr. for $51.2 million. The company sold its remaining stock in Omega Proteine on December 1, 2006, leaving it with no active subsidiary. The Glazer family sold its controlling stock of the Zapata Corporation to Philip Falcone's Harbinger Capital in 2009, and the company's name was changed to Harbinger Group Inc. with the ticker symbol HRG on the NYSE. In 2010–2011, Harbinger Capital Partners LLC transferred its 54.4% interest in Spectrum Brands to Harbinger Group Inc. giving the company controlling interest in that company. Also in 2011 Harbinger Group Inc. acquired the insurance company Old Mutual U.S. Life Holdings, Inc. from Old Mutual.

In December 2013, Salus Capital (a unit of Harbinger Group) and Cerberus Capital Management issued a quarter-billion dollars in financing to struggling retailer RadioShack Corporation. Among the terms of this deal were restrictions which prevented RadioShack from closing more than 200 of its 4275 company-owned retail stores a year and limited its ability to refinance, which proved to be a key obstacle leading to that firm's February 2015 Chapter 11 bankruptcy as the chain was forced to keep more than a thousand unprofitable stores open. Fidelity & Guaranty Life, the insurer backed by Harbinger Group, also has a $50 million stake in the RadioShack bankruptcy. An impairment of $105.0, out of the $150 million net exposure, recognized as of March 31, 2015.

On February 26, 2018, the company announced it was merging with Spectrum Brands, which it was a controlling shareholder of. The merger was completed on July 13.
