= Springfield Township, Pennsylvania =

Springfield Township, Pennsylvania may refer to:

- Springfield Township, Delaware County, Pennsylvania, the most populous town named Springfield in Pennsylvania, as well as the largest by area
- Springfield Township, Bradford County, Pennsylvania
- Springfield Township, Bucks County, Pennsylvania
- Springfield Township, Erie County, Pennsylvania
- Springfield Township, Fayette County, Pennsylvania
- Springfield Township, Huntingdon County, Pennsylvania
- Springfield Township, Mercer County, Pennsylvania
- Springfield Township, Montgomery County, Pennsylvania
- Springfield Township, York County, Pennsylvania

== See also ==
- Springfield (disambiguation)
