= J. Hugh Liedtke =

American petroleum executive

- Born: February 10, 1922; Tulsa, Oklahoma, U.S.
- Died: March 28, 2003 (aged 81); Houston, Texas, U.S.
- Occupation: Businessman
- Relatives: Bill Liedtke (brother)

John Hugh Liedtke (/ˈlɪtki/ LIT-kee; February 10, 1922 – March 28, 2003) was an American petroleum executive.

== Early life ==
John Hugh Liedtke was born on February 10, 1922, in Tulsa, Oklahoma. During World War II, he served in the United States Armed Forces. Liedtke graduated from Amherst College in three years with a bachelor's degree, Harvard Business School with an MBA, and University of Texas School of Law.

== Career ==
Liedtke moved to Midland, Texas, then opened a law practice with his brother, William, in 1949.

With the future President of the United States George H. W. Bush, the two brothers co-founded the Zapata Corporation in 1953. In the 1960s the Liedtke brothers acquired control of the South Penn Oil Company and merged it with Zapata to form a new company they called Pennzoil. In the 1980s, during his time as CEO of Pennzoil, he led the company to a court victory over Texaco.

== Death ==
Liedtke died on March 28, 2003, in Houston, Texas.
