= Pennzoil =

American motor oil brand owned by Shell plc

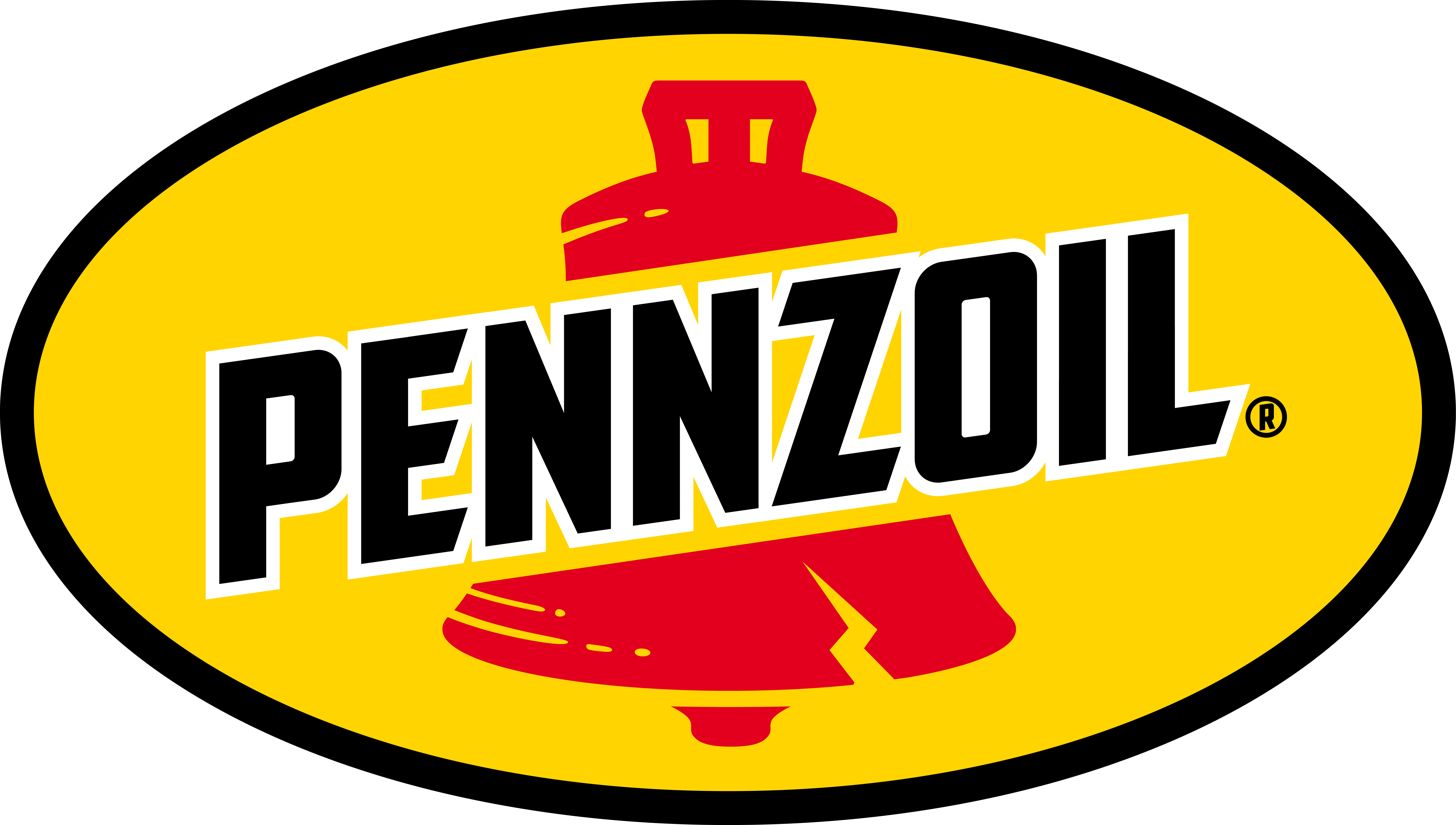

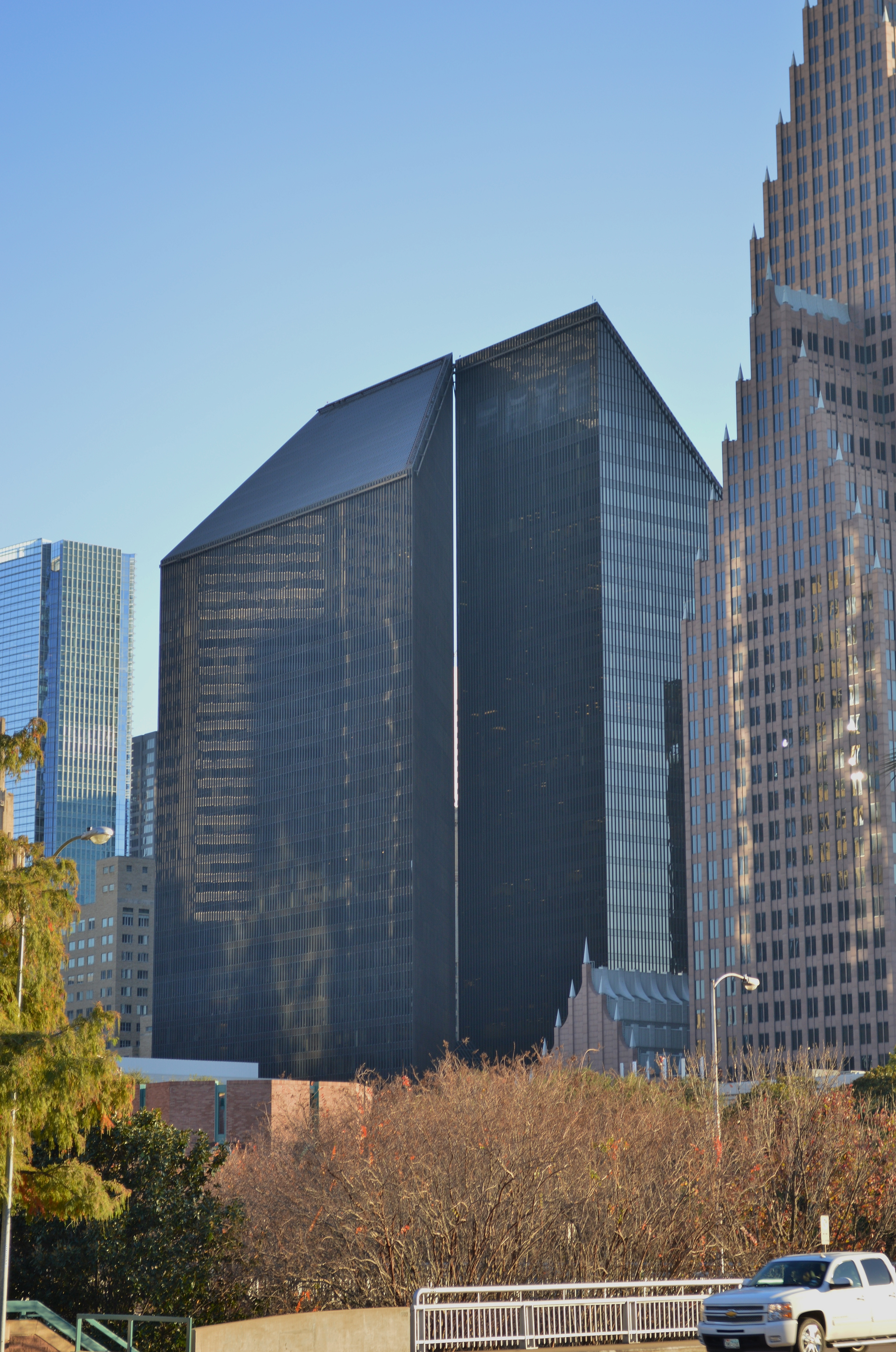
- Pennzoil Place, former company headquarters
- Formerly: Pennzoil Co. (1913–63); Pennzoil United Inc. (1968–72); Pennzoil Co. (1972–98); Pennzoil-Quaker State (1998–2002)
- Type: Brand
- Industry: Petroleum
- Predecessor: South Penn Oil Co.
- Founded: 1913; 113 years ago in Oil City, Pennsylvania
- Founders: Michael Late Benedum; Joe Trees
- Fate: Acquired by Shell Oil Company in 2002, becoming a brand of it, along with Quaker State
- Headquarters: Houston, U.S.
- Products: Motor oils
- Brands: Pennzoil (1916–)
- Owner: Shell plc
- Website: pennzoil.com

Pennzoil is an American motor oil brand currently owned by Shell plc. The former Pennzoil Company had been established in 1913 in Pennsylvania, being active in business as an independent firm until it was acquired by Shell in 2002, becoming a brand of the conglomerate.

== History ==
=== Beginning and expansion ===
Origins of the company can be traced to the South Penn Oil Company, an oil business started in Oil City, Pennsylvania by Michael Late Benedum and Joe Trees in May 1889 as a unit of Standard Oil. It became the largest oil producer in the region, becoming independent when Standard Oil was split in 1911. By those times, two companies, one on the East Coast and another on the West (founded in 1908 and 1913, respectively) started to market their motor oils under the brand Pennzoil. Their refineries and distributors were later incorporated as "The Pennzoil Company" in 1925. In July 1926, South Penn acquired a 51% controlling interest which by June 1955 had risen to 88% when shareholders voted to exchange remaining shares 1:1 for South Penn stock and merge Pennzoil, the refining and marketing subsidiary, into South Penn Oil.

In 1963, South Penn Oil merged with Zapata Petroleum and Stetco Petroleum to form a new "Pennzoil Company", headquartered in Houston and appointing Hugh Liedtke as president. By 1965 Pennzoil marketed its petroleum products worldwide. In 1968, United Gas Corporation was purchased by Pennzoil, through a leveraged buyout, which was necessary because Pennzoil did not have enough assets to buy United outright.

During the 1970s, the company moved its offices to the Pennzoil Place in Downtown Houston, Texas.

In 1977 a spin-off company was formed called POGO, an acronym for Pennzoil Offshore Gas Operators.

=== Pennzoil, Co. v. Texaco, Inc. ===
In 1984, Pennzoil made an informal but binding contract with Getty Oil to purchase a large portion of Getty Oil to give Pennzoil rights to Getty's oil deposits. Following the deal, the Texaco oil company encroached on the complex merger in an attempt to acquire Getty for itself.

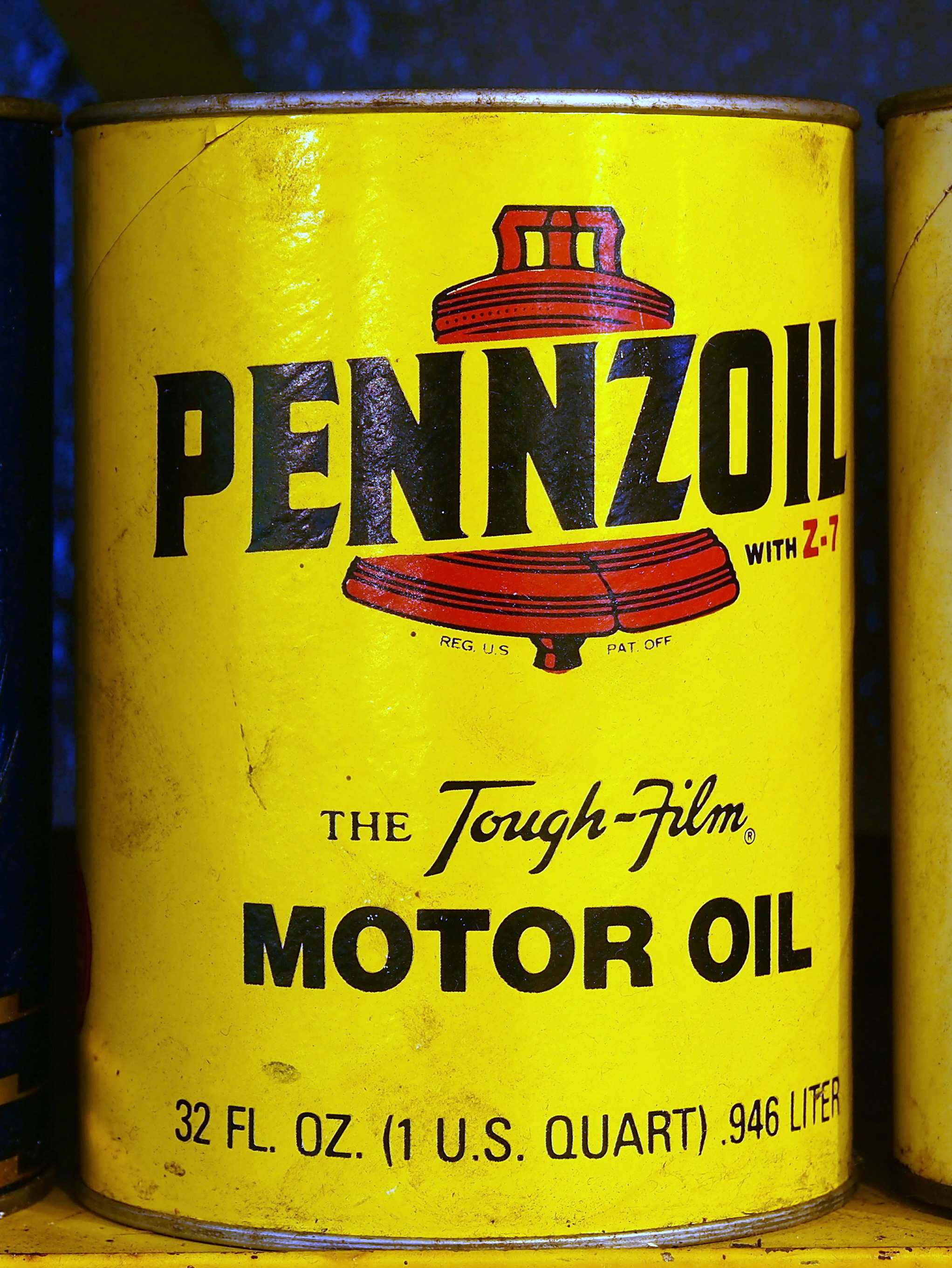
Old Pennzoil motor oil can

Pennzoil sued Texaco in Texas state court, alleging that Texaco tortiously induced Getty to breach the contract with Pennzoil. At first it was adjudicated by Judge Anthony J.P. Farris; it was finished by visiting Judge Solomon (Sol) Casseb of San Antonio. A jury awarded Pennzoil, represented by Joe Jamail and Baine Kerr, $7.53 billion in compensatory damages and $3 billion in punitive damages. Under Texas law, Pennzoil could secure a lien on all of Texaco's property in the state, unless Texaco posted a bond that covered the judgment, interests and costs of the lawsuit (estimated to be $13 billion).

Before judgment could be entered in the Texas court and Pennzoil could obtain a lien, Texaco filed a suit in the U.S. District Court for the Southern District of New York, alleging that the Texas proceedings violated Texaco's constitutional rights. The District Court found for Texaco, and the Second Circuit affirmed. Pennzoil appealed the federal court case to the United States Supreme Court. Laurence H. Tribe argued for Pennzoil, and David Boies for Texaco. The Supreme Court reversed the circuit court decision, on the grounds that the federal court in New York should have abstained from interfering with the decision of a state court.

Texaco also appealed the Texas state court decision. The Texas Court of Appeals upheld the jury verdict, but found that the trial court had abused its discretion by not suggesting a remittitur (reduction of damages). It would allow the verdict to stand if Pennzoil filed a remittitur of two billion dollars, making the punitive damages award $1 billion. Compensatory damages of $7.53 billion remained unaffected. Pennzoil paid Jamail $335 million and Kerr $10 million for the victory.

After Texaco filed for bankruptcy, Pennzoil agreed to settle the case for $3 billion.

=== Acquisition ===
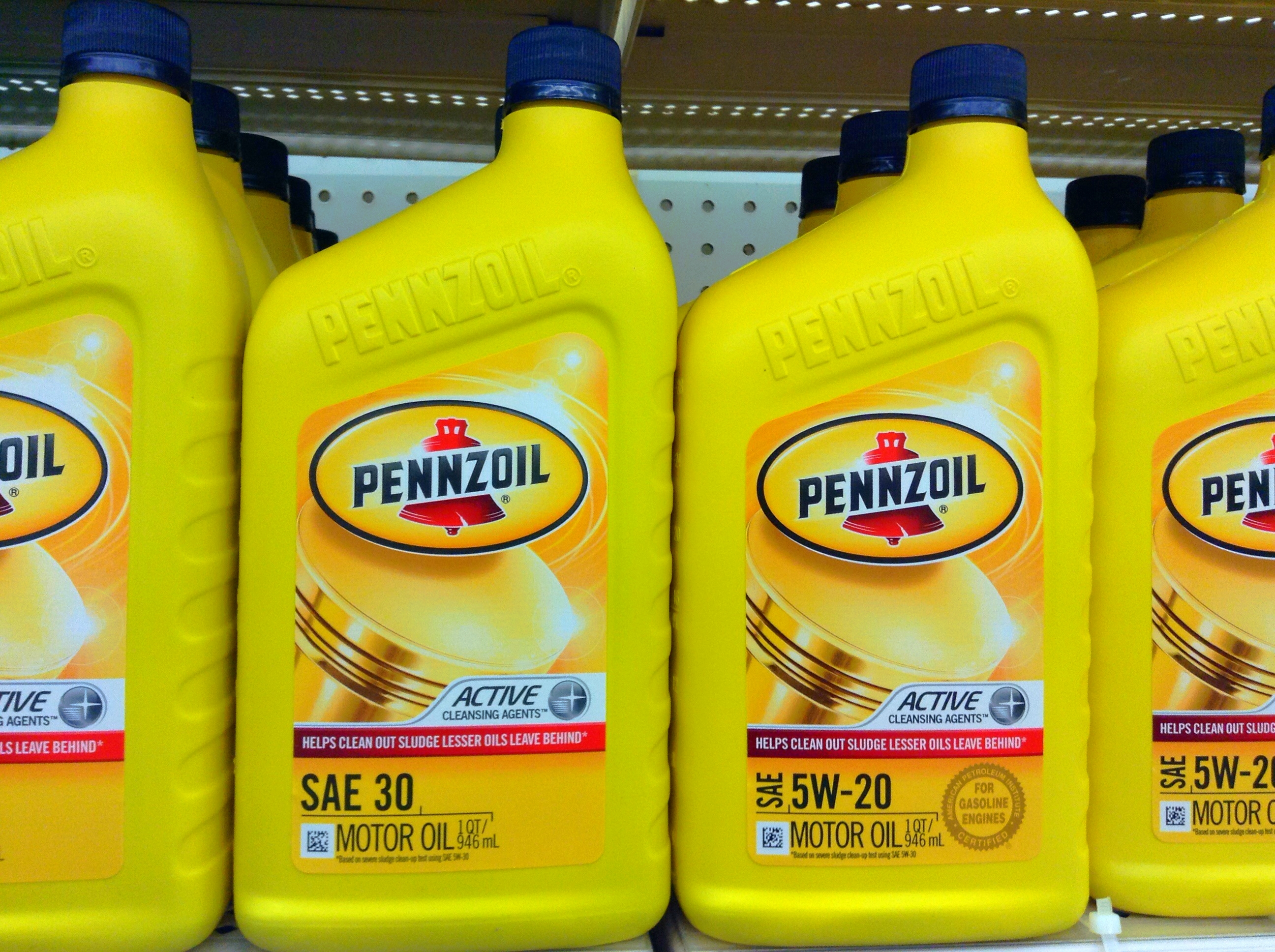
Modern Pennzoil motor oil bottles

In 1998, Pennzoil's motor oils, products and services divisions were spun off as an independent company, which then acquired rival Quaker State Oil Production Corporation, becoming "Pennzoil-Quaker State Company". In 1999 Pennzoil's E&P business (known as PennzEnergy) was acquired by Oklahoma City-based Devon Energy and the business now known as the Pennzoil-Quaker State Company was purchased by Royal Dutch/Shell Group to form SOPUS Products (an acronym for Shell Oil Products US).

Shell Oil Company (the US-based subsidiary of Shell plc) acquired Pennzoil-Quaker State company in 2002 to market its products as two separate motor oil brands, Pennzoil and Quaker State.

== Gasoline ==
Though not much emphasis was ever placed on gasoline by the company, Pennzoil did sell it. In the early parts of the company's history, the gas stations were branded as Pennzip, though they were later changed to Pennzoil. For decades, Pennzoil gas stations were mostly marketed in western Pennsylvania, western New York, northern and eastern Ohio, and northern West Virginia.

In the 1990s, Pennzoil gas experienced a bit of a revival when Pittsburgh area convenience store chain Cogo's began co-branding themselves with Pennzoil. The co-branding lasted only a few years, and Cogo's switched brands to BP and Exxon in 2001.

After Shell's purchase of Pennzoil, there was the possibility that the remaining Pennzoil stations—mostly in western Pennsylvania—would be converted to Shell as part of the company's aggressive movement to expand nationally. This did not happen, but the three company-owned Pennzoil gas stations in the New Castle, Pennsylvania, area began co-branding themselves with 7-Eleven in 2003, with more emphasis placed on the 7-Eleven brand name than Pennzoil itself.

Gradually, BP began replacing Pennzoil at some of these sites in 2006 while retaining 7-Eleven (a Pennzoil in Ambridge, Pennsylvania, also converted to BP at the same time) while others were sold to private owners and became independent, unbranded locations. By the mid-2010s, Pennzoil was no longer selling gasoline.

== Commercial automotive and motorcycle partnerships ==
Pennzoil is an official long-term recommended motor oil of all Stellantis companies (including all of brands and subsidiaries excluding Peugeot, Citroën, DS Automobiles, Opel and Vauxhall with TotalEnergies and Alfa Romeo, FIAT, Lancia and Abarth with Selenia), BMW, Mini, Rolls-Royce, Hyundai, Genesis, Chevrolet (shared with Mobil 1 and Valvoline), Ferrari (since 2002 due to Pennzoil being acquired by Ferrari's oil partner Shell) and Iveco for automobiles in United States. Pennzoil is also an official long-term recommended motorcycle engine oil of BMW Motorrad and Ducati for motorcycles in United States.

== Motorsports ==
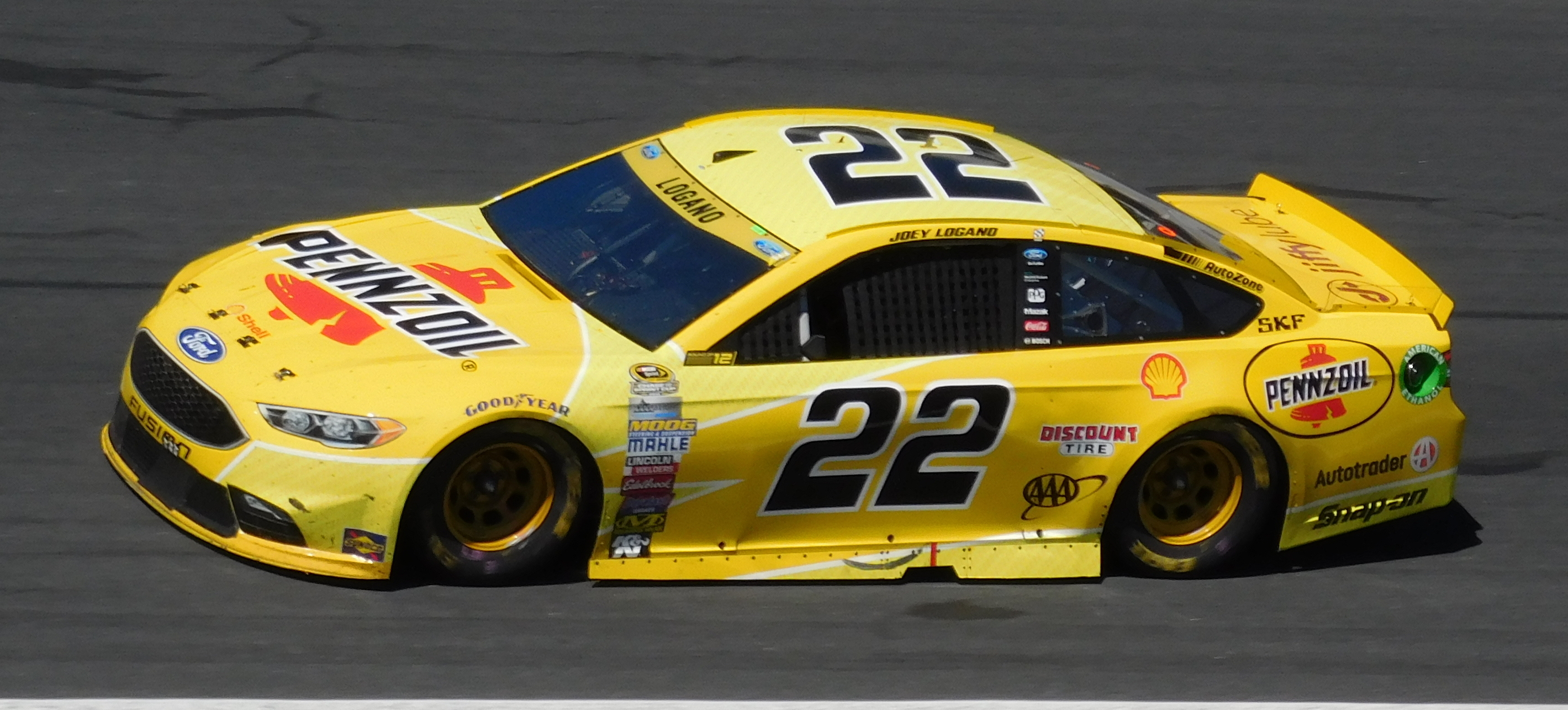
Joey Logano's 2016 Pennzoil-sponsored Ford Fusion at Charlotte Motor Speedway

IndyCar drivers Al Unser and Johnny Rutherford were sponsored by Pennzoil in the Chaparral team. Rutherford won the Indianapolis 500 and the CART World Series championship in 1980. From 1983 to 1990, Pennzoil sponsored the Team Penske driver Rick Mears during his CART campaign, winning the 1984 and 1988 Indianapolis 500. IndyCar Series driver Sam Hornish Jr. drove for Pennzoil-sponsored Panther Racing from 2001 to 2003. From 2011 until 2020, Team Penske driver Hélio Castroneves was sponsored part-time by Pennzoil, most notably at the Indianapolis 500. The Pennzoil sponsorship transferred to Scott McLaughlin when he replaced Castroneves at Penske. Pennzoil's yellow IndyCar livery has been nicknamed the "Yellow Submarine".

In the NASCAR Cup Series, Dale Earnhardt, Inc. had a Pennzoil sponsorship for Steve Park in their No.1 car from 1998 to 2003. Richard Childress Racing driver Kevin Harvick had a Pennzoil sponsorship from 2007 to 2010. Team Penske took over the Pennzoil sponsorship in 2011 with Kurt Busch and in 2012, it was moved over to A. J. Allmendinger and to Joey Logano in 2013, who won the 2018 and 2022 championships and the 2015 Daytona 500. Starting in 2018, Pennzoil has sponsored the Las Vegas NASCAR Cup Series spring race, the Pennzoil 400, with Logano winning the 2019 and 2020 editions of the race in his Pennzoil No.22.

Pennzoil was the title sponsor of the Grand Prix of Houston in 2013. Pennzoil also has been the official motor oil of German-American GTLM team BMW Team Rahal Letterman Lanigan Racing since 2015 season and also American Formula One team Haas F1 Team since 2016 season. Pennzoil sponsors NHRA's Don Schumacher Racing and drivers Matt Hagan (Funny Car) and Leah Pruett (Top Fuel). They also sponsored driver Ken Block, best known for his Gymkhana series on YouTube.

From 1998 to 2001, Nismo in JGTC was sponsored by Pennzoil through Itochu, who owned the brand's rights in Japan. The Nissan Skyline GT-R won the 1998 and 1999 GT500 titles; the car in its Pennzoil livery has since been featured in several Gran Turismo video games.

Pennzoil also partnering and supplying lubricants to Formula One team and manufacturer Scuderia Ferrari and MotoGP team Ducati Team due to Shell partnership.

== See also ==
- Getty Oil
- Jiffy Lube
- Shell Oil Company
- Quaker State
