= Federalism in the United States =

Division of powers between national, state, tribal and local governments

In the United States, federalism is the constitutional division of power between U.S. state governments and the federal government of the United States. Since the founding of the country, and particularly with the end of the American Civil War, power shifted away from the states and toward the national government. The progression of federalism includes dual, cooperative, and New Federalism.

== Early federalism ==
Federalism is a form of political organization that seeks to divide power between local states and the government, distributing different powers at different levels to allow a degree of political independence in an overarching structure. In the United States, federal republicanism became a political solution to the problems with the Articles of Confederation which gave little practical authority to the confederal government. For example, the Articles allowed the Congress of the Confederation the power to sign treaties and declare war, but it could not raise taxes to pay for an army and all major decisions required a unanimous vote.

The movement for federalism was greatly strengthened by the reaction to Shays' Rebellion of 1786–1787, where an armed uprising of yeoman farmers in western Massachusetts rose up in response to a poor economy that was created, in part, by the inability of the confederal government to deal effectively with the debt from the American Revolutionary War. The confederal government had trouble raising an effective force to quell the rebellion, and Massachusetts was forced to raise its own.

The Annapolis Convention met in 1786, in which twelve delegates from five U.S. states (New Jersey, New York, Pennsylvania, Delaware, and Virginia) gathered to discuss and develop a consensus on reversing the protectionist trade barriers that each state had erected. New Hampshire, Massachusetts, Rhode Island, and North Carolina had appointed commissioners, but failed to arrive in Annapolis in time to attend the meeting. Connecticut, Maryland, South Carolina, and Georgia had taken no actions at all. The final report of the convention was adopted unanimously and sent to the Congress and to the states. It sought support for a broader constitutional convention to be held the following May in Philadelphia. It hoped that more states would be represented and that their delegates or deputies would be authorized to examine areas broader than simply commercial trade. On May 15, 1787, fifty-five delegates met at what would be known as the Constitutional Convention in the Philadelphia State House. There, the delegates debated the structure, provisions, and limitations of Federalism in what would be the Constitution of the United States.

Preceding examples, such as in the Virginia Declaration of Rights, influenced the delegates whilst framing ideas of Federal bicameral legislature, a balanced representation of small and large states (Great Compromise), and a structure of checks and balances. James Madison stated in a pre-convention memorandum to the delegates that because "one could hardly expect the state legislatures to take enlightened views on national affairs", a stronger central government was necessary. Madison later wrote in Federalist No. 10 on his support for a federal government:

"The smaller the number of individuals composing a majority, and the smaller the compass within which they are placed, the more easily will they concert and execute their plans of oppression. Extend the sphere, and you take in a greater variety of parties and interests; you make it less probable that a majority of the whole will have a common motive to invade the rights of other citizens".

The convention had begun altering its original plan but then decided to abandon continued efforts of emendation, and officially set about constructing a new Constitution of the United States. This new Constitution would eventually be ratified in all states. Once the convention concluded and released the Constitution for public consumption, the Federalist and Anti-Federalist movements soon began publicizing their disagreeing beliefs in local newspapers and segments.

The most forceful defense of the new Constitution was The Federalist Papers, a compilation of 85 anonymous essays published in New York City to convince the people of the state to vote for ratification. These articles, written by Alexander Hamilton and James Madison, with some contributed by John Jay, examined the benefits of the new, proposed Constitution, and analyzed the political theory and function behind the various articles of the Constitution. The Federalist Papers remain important in American history and political science.

Anti-Federalists, who were opposed to the new Constitution, were generally local rather than cosmopolitan in perspective, oriented to plantations and farms rather than commerce or finance, and wanted strong state governments and a weak national government. According to political scientist James Wilson, the Anti-Federalists "were much more committed to strong states and a weak national government....A strong national government, they felt, would be distant from the people and would use its powers to annihilate or absorb the functions that properly belonged to the states." Anti-Federalists established a newspaper similar to The Federalist Papers known as the Anti-Federalist Papers that argued for these ideals, but was less organized than its counterpart, and failed to gain similar traction.

The Anti-Federalist critique soon centered on the absence of a bill of rights, which Federalists in the ratifying conventions promised to provide. Washington and Madison had personally pledged to consider amendments, realizing that they would be necessary to reduce pressure for a second constitutional convention that might drastically alter and weaken the new federal government. Madison proposed amendments that gave more rights to individuals than to states, which led to criticisms of diversion by Anti-Federalists.

The outgoing Congress of the Confederation scheduled elections for the new government, and set March 4, 1789 as the date that the new government would take power. In 1789, the new Congress of the United States submitted twelve articles of amendment to the states. Ten of these articles, written by congressional committees, achieved passage on December 15, 1791, and became the United States Bill of Rights. The Tenth Amendment set the guidelines for federalism in the United States.

=== Federalist Party ===
After the first federalist movement achieved its aims in promoting the Constitution, an official Federalist Party emerged with slightly different aims. This one was based on the policies of Alexander Hamilton and his allies for a stronger national government, a loose construction of the Constitution, and a mercantile (rather than agricultural) economy. As time progressed, the factions which adhered to these policies organized themselves into the nation's first political party, the Federalist Party, and the movement's focus and fortunes began to track those of the party it spawned.

While the Federalist movement of the 1780s and the Federalist Party were distinct entities, they were related in more than just a common name. The Jeffersonian or Democratic-Republican Party, the opposition to the Federalist Party, emphasized the fear that a strong national government was a threat to the liberties of the people. They stressed that the national debt created by the new government would bankrupt the country, and that federal bondholders were paid through taxes collected from honest farmers and workingmen. These themes resonated with the Anti-Federalists, the opposition to the Federalist movement of the 1780s. As Norman Risjord has documented for Virginia, of the supporters of the Constitution in 1788, 69% joined the Federalist party, while nearly all (94%) of the opponents joined the Anti-Federalists. 71% of Thomas Jefferson's supporters in Virginia were former Anti-Federalists who continued to fear centralized government, while only 29% had been proponents of the Constitution a few years before. However, James Madison, who was one of the strongest proponents of the Constitution and a member of the first federalist movement, became a Jeffersonian, while some who were Anti-Federalists prior to the ratification of the Constitution, such as Patrick Henry, became supportive of the Federalist Party.

The movement reached its zenith with the election of John Adams, an overtly Federalist President. However, with the defeat of Adams in the election of 1800 and the death of Hamilton, the Federalist Party began a long decline from which it never recovered. What finally finished off the Federalist party was the Hartford Convention of 1814, in which five New England states gathered to discuss several constitutional amendments necessary to protect New England's interests in regard to the blockade of their ports by the British during the War of 1812. The threat of secession also was proposed during these secret meetings. Three delegates were sent to Washington, DC to negotiate New England's terms only to discover the signing of the Treaty of Ghent, ending the war with the British. Across the nation, Republicans used the great victory at New Orleans to ridicule the Federalists as cowards or defeatists. The Federalists were thereafter associated with the disloyalty and parochialism of the Hartford Convention and destroyed as a political force.

== Under the Marshall Court ==
The United States Supreme Court under Chief Justice John Marshall played an important role in defining the power of the federal and state governments during the early 19th century. As the U.S. Constitution does not specifically define many dividing lines between the layers of government, the Supreme Court settled the issue in New York. The question was answered particularly in the cases, McCulloch v. Maryland, in which the court unanimously found that the states could not tax a federal institution that was deemed legitimate and appropriate, Gibbons v. Ogden, in which Congress was confirmed control of interstate commerce under the commerce clause instead of the states, and Marbury v. Madison, which broadly expanded the power of the national government. A notable instance in which the Marshall Court empowered the states under federalism was in that of Barron v. Baltimore, a case which resulted in Marshall's court unanimously concluding that the 5th amendment only applied to the federal government and not the states.

== Dual federalism ==
Despite Chief Justice Marshall's strong push for the federal government, the court of his successor, Roger B. Taney (1835–1864), decided cases that favored equally strong national and state governments. The basic philosophy during this time was that the U.S. Government ought to be limited to its enumerated powers and that all others belonged to the states. Any powers that were not granted to the U. S. Government by the Constitution were handed over to the states through the Tenth Amendment. Dual federalism had a significant impact on social issues in the United States. Dred Scott v. Sanford was an example of how Taney's dual federalism helped stir up tensions eventually leading to the outbreak of the Civil War. Another example of dual federalism's social impact was in the Plessy v. Ferguson ruling. Dual federalism had set up that the U.S. Government could not legislate on moral issues. It was an issue that had to be decided by the states, and thus "separate but equal" could exist. Lastly, near the end of dual federalism's lifespan, both the Sixteenth and the Seventeenth Amendment bolstered the power of the national government, and divided state and federal power (Fuad Nor, 1977).

== Between dual federalism and the New Deal ==
The ratification of the Fourteenth Amendment in 1868 marked a significant transfer of authority from state governments to the federal government, declaring United States citizenship paramount to state citizenship. Over time, the application of the Fourteenth Amendment and incorporation of the Bill of Rights to the states strengthened the federal government's power to protect against state intrusions upon individual rights. The 14th Amendment ensured the shielding of fundamental rights of the individual citizen against the threats presented by rights of the state by the Privileges or Immunities Clause.

Still, in the immediate aftermath of the Taney court and the rise of Dual federalism, the division of labor between federal, state, and local governments was relatively unchanged for over a century. Political scientist Theodore J. Lowi summarized the system in place during those years in The End of the Republican Era

This lack of change is nowhere more apparent than in Supreme Court rulings that addressed federalism against the backdrop of the laissez-faire, pro-business Gilded Age. In United States v. E.C. Knight Co. (1895), the Supreme Court continued along the path of promoting dual federalism in striking down a provision of the Sherman Antitrust Act. In an 8–1 decision, the Court ruled that Congress lacked the authority under the Commerce Clause to regulate monopolies by adopting a limited interpretation of interstate commerce, a win for states' rights. In 1918, a 5–4 majority ruled similarly in Hammer v. Dagenhart, a challenge against the constitutionality of the Federal Child Labor Act of 1915. However, by 1941, this ruling was reversed in United States v. Darby Lumber Company. The Court delivered another victory for dual federalism in Coyle v. Smith (1911), where Oklahoma's effort to relocate their capital to Oklahoma City was halted. The state agreed to keep the capital in Guthrie until at least 1913 as part of the terms of their Enabling Act of 1906, which outlined the conditions for Oklahoma's acceptance into the Union as a state. These cases illustrate the Supreme Court's consistent willingness to rule in favor of states' rights until National Labor Relations Board v. Jones & Laughlin Steel Corporation (1937), which ushered in a new era of cooperative federalism for the courts.

Despite the Supreme Court's stubbornness on guarding states' rights, much of the modern federal apparatus owes its origins to changes that occurred during the period between 1861 and 1933. While banks had long been incorporated and regulated by the states, the National Bank Acts of 1863 and 1864 saw Congress establish a network of national banks that had their reserve requirements set by officials in Washington. During World War I, a system of federal banks devoted to aiding farmers was established, and a network of federal banks designed to promote homeownership came into existence in the last year of Herbert Hoover's administration. Congress used its power over interstate commerce to regulate the rates of interstate (and eventually intrastate) railroads and even regulated their stock issues and labor relations, going so far as to enact a law regulating pay rates for railroad workers on the eve of World War I. During the 1920s, Congress enacted laws bestowing collective bargaining rights on employees of interstate railroads. Congress also used the commerce power to enact morals legislation, such as the Mann Act of 1907 barring the transfer of women across state lines for immoral purposes, even as the commerce power remained limited to interstate transportation—it did not extend to what were viewed as intrastate activities such as manufacturing and mining.

As early as 1913, there was talk of regulating stock exchanges, and the Capital Issues Committee formed to control access to credit during World War I recommended federal regulation of all stock issues and exchanges shortly before it ceased operating in 1921. With the Morrill Land-Grant Acts Congress used land sale revenues to make grants to the states for colleges during the Civil War on the theory that land sale revenues could be devoted to subjects beyond those listed in Article I, Section 8 of the Constitution. On several occasions during the 1880s, one house of Congress or the other passed bills providing land sale revenues to the states for the purpose of aiding primary schools. During the first years of the twentieth century, the endeavors funded with federal grants multiplied, and Congress began using general revenues to fund them—thus utilizing the general welfare clause's broad spending power, even though it had been discredited for almost a century (Hamilton's view that a broad spending power could be derived from the clause had been all but abandoned by 1840).

During Herbert Hoover's administration, grants went to the states for the purpose of funding poor relief. The 1920s saw Washington expand its role in domestic law enforcement. Disaster relief for areas affected by floods or crop failures dated from 1874, and these appropriations began to multiply during the administration of Woodrow Wilson (1913–21). By 1933, the precedents necessary for the federal government to exercise broad regulatory power over all economic activity and spend for any purpose it saw fit were almost all in place. Virtually all that remained was for the will to be mustered in Congress and for the Supreme Court to acquiesce.

=== State government policies ===
- Property law
- Education
- Estate and inheritance law
- Commerce laws of ownership and exchange
- Banking and credit laws
- Labor law and professional licensure
- Insurance laws
- Family laws
- Morals laws
- Public health and quarantine laws
- Public works laws, including eminent domain
- Building codes
- Corporations law
- Land use laws
- Water and mineral resource laws
- Judiciary and criminal procedure laws
- Electoral laws, including parties
- Civil service laws

=== Local government policies ===
- Variances (adaptation of state law to local conditions)
- Public works
- Contracts for public works
- Licensing of public accommodations
- Assessable improvements
- Basic public services

== Cooperative federalism ==
Cooperative Federalism involves a looser interpretation of the Tenth Amendment. More specifically, it supports the idea that the Tenth Amendment does not provide any additional powers to the states. It operates under the assumption that the federal and state governments are "partners," with the federal creating laws for the states to carry out. It relies on the Supremacy Clause and the Necessary and Proper Clause as constitutional bases for its argument. Court cases such as United States v. Darby Lumber Co. and Garcia v. San Antonio Metropolitan Transit Authority expanded the role of Cooperative Federalism by forcing states to enforce federal labor laws.

Although Cooperative Federalism has roots in the civil war, the Great Depression marked an abrupt end to Dual Federalism and a dramatic shift to a strong national government. President Franklin D. Roosevelt's New Deal policies reached into the lives of U.S. citizens like no other federal measure had. As the Supreme Court had rejected nearly all of Roosevelt's economic proposals, the president proposed the Judicial Procedures Reform Bill of 1937 to add more members. The expansion of the Court, which never materialized, along with a Democrat-controlled Congress would tilt Court rulings in favor of Roosevelt's policies. Lowi notes three Supreme Court cases that validated the shift in power:

- National Labor Relations Board v. Jones & Laughlin Steel Corporation,
- Helvering v. Davis, and
- Steward Machine Company v. Davis.

The national government was forced to cooperate with all levels of government to implement the New Deal policies; local government earned an equal standing with the other layers, as the federal government relied on political machines at a city level to bypass state legislatures. The formerly distinct division of responsibilities between state and national government had been described as a "layer cake," but, with the lines of duty blurred, cooperative federalism was likened to a "marble cake" or a "picket fence." In cooperative federalism, federal funds are distributed through grants in aid or categorical grants which gave the federal government more control over the use of the money.

== New Federalism ==
Another movement calling itself "New Federalism" appeared in the late 20th century and early 21st century. Many of the ideas of New Federalism originated with Richard Nixon. New Federalism, which is characterized by a gradual return of power to the states, was initiated by President Ronald Reagan (1981–89) with his "devolution revolution" in the early 1980s and lasted until 2001. Previously, the federal government had granted money to the states categorically, limiting the states to use this funding for specific programs. Reagan's administration, however, introduced a practice of giving block grants, freeing state governments to spend the money at their own discretion. An example and the first case of this was Garcia v. San Antonio Metropolitan Transit Authority (SAMTA) (1985). Garcia was a worker for SAMTA and appealed that because SAMTA received federal money, that they had to abide by federal labor regulations. SAMTA argued that they did not because the money received was to be used at their own discretion and did not need to abide by federal statutes because they are locally operated and make decisions about the transit system. This gave more autonomy and power to the states by allowing them to use more discretion, not having to abide by federal regulations.

Under New Federalism, the question is should the federal government constitutionally command the states to carry out federal policy. For this, the courts use the anti-commandeering principle. "The anti-commandeering doctrine says that the federal government cannot require states or state officials to adopt or enforce federal law." This became the principle by New York v. United States (1992). In this case, New York sued the federal government, questioning the authority of Congress to regulate waste management. The courts ruled that it violated the 10th amendment because congress made the state of New York commandeer to federal regulations when states already take legal ownership and liability for waste treatment. Establishing this principle, giving states more autonomy on issues that fall under their discretion.

A modern-day application of this rule can be found in Murphy v. National Collegiate Athletic Association (2018). New Jersey's governor attacked the federal government's prohibition on sports gambling. The courts again used the anti-commandeering principle, allowing states to regulate sports gambling at their discretion. This is starting to become a trend because now states are passing laws on issues that are often federally prohibited or heavily regulated by Congress under the commerce clause, as in the areas of medical marijuana (Gonzales v. Raich), partial-birth abortion (Gonzales v. Carhart), gun possession (United States v. Lopez), federal police powers (United States v. Morrison, which struck down portions of the Violence Against Women Act), or agriculture (Wickard v. Filburn).

=== Recent federalism ===
The balance between state and federal power has fluctuated in the 21st century. In a 2009 Rockefeller Institute report by Martha Derthick, she argues that "the normal tendency of federal-state relations in the United States is toward centralization."

Examples of Federalism in the 21st Century

National Injunction Limits

Following President Trump's issuance of Executive Order 14160 regarding birthright citizenship to illegal immigrants children who are born on U.S. soil, multiple district courts issued universal preliminary injunctions blocking the order nationwide. Trump v. CASA, In 2026 the Supreme Court of the United States ruled 6-3 that federal district courts likely exceed their equitable authority under the Judiciary Act of 1789 when they issue nationwide injunctions that block federal policies beyond the specific parties involved in a lawsuit.

Federal Agency Deference and Mandates

San Francisco uses a combined sewer system where household sewage and rainwater runoff travel through the same pipes. When it rains heavily, the system overflows, pouring a mixture of rainwater and dirty wastewater directly into the ocean. EPA gave San Francisco a permit to handle the overflows. They said “Your overflows cannot cause the ocean water quality to drop below safety standards.” And San Francisco said they needed to give them a specific limit.

San Francisco v. EPA. In 2025 the United States Supreme Court ruled 5-4 that the Clean Water Act does not allow the U.S. Environmental Protection Agency to impose broad, outcome based “end result” conditions in National Pollutant Discharge Elimination System (NPDES) permits.

State Standing Rules

Interim Storage Partners applied for and received an NRC license to temporarily store up to 5,500 tons of spent nuclear fuel for 40 years in Andrews County, West Texas.The U.S. court of Appeals for the Fifth Circuit previously vacated the license, finding it exceeded the NRC’s authority. The United States Supreme Court ruled 6-3 on June 18th, 2025, that entities who were not formal parties to a Nuclear Regulatory Commission licensing proceeding cannot obtain judicial review of that decision under the Hobbs Act.

Jurisdictional Venues

After the Environmental Protection Agency (EPA) used a single Federal Register notice in 2023 to disapprove “Good Neighbor” ozone compliance plans for 21 states (including Oklahoma), attempting to transfer all ensuing challenges to the D.C. Circuit. Oklahoma v. EPA. On June 18th, 2025 SCOTUS ruled in an 8-0 decision, the EPA disapproval of state implementation plans under the Clean Air Act are local or regional actions, not national ones.

Redistricting Jurisdictions

The federal court mandates under voting rights act frequently clash with state legislatures over district mapping. Using Louisiana V. Callais as a modern example of the ongoing tussle over majority-minority voting maps. Louisiana v. Callais was the decision of the Supreme Court of the United States concerning racial gerrymandering and redistricting in the state of Louisiana following the 2020 United States census.

==== Presidency of George W. Bush ====
About the Bush administration (2001–2009), Derthick stated "conventional federalism has survived the test of an aggressive presidency" in regards to military and emergency action, and further, the Bush administration was "in retrospect, more centralizing than militarizing." In a 2007 paper in Publius: The Journal of Federalism, Sidney Milkis and Jesse Rhodes argue that "The Republican Party has traditionally stood for 'limited government', but Bush's principal legacy for federalism is centralization of power in the federal government and the executive branch." According to Thomas L. Gais on federalism in the Obama Administration, "effort to impose central control is nothing new: GWB Administration did much the same."

==== Presidency of Barack Obama ====
The federal government increased its powers under the presidency of Barack Obama (2009–2017), and to an extent, the powers of the state governments also grew. In 2011, scholar Gillian Metzger discussed that "national developments entail some preemption and new state burdens. But each also has brought with it significant regulatory and financial opportunities for the states." Metzger points out that the states had increased regulatory responsibilities under Dodd-Frank, increased responsibilities in implementing and operating federal health care legislation under the Affordable Care Act, and received additional stimulus funding. Obama took office following the 2008 financial crisis, which called for him to take action to stabilize the economy. In 2009, he subsequently introduced The American Recovery and Reinvestment Act (ARRA). This act placed a federal focus on providing stabilizing state and local budgets, financial bailouts, and ensuring jobs were secure. ARRA was seen as a significant exertion of federal power which many conservatives criticized—however, this was through a coalition that included state governments as very active participants who worked closely in drafting and implementation. According to a 2010 article by Thomas L. Gais of the Rockefeller Institute, the Obama administration had been engaged with states more heavily than any administration since the 1960s, was more reliant than ever on state action, and states had the highest proportion of government employees compared to the federal government in history up to that point. Gais labelled this "assertive federalism". The cannabis policy of the Barack Obama administration was an easing of federal enforcement, granting more rights to the states in determining the legality of marijuana.

==== Presidency of Donald Trump ====
Federalism under Donald Trump (2017–2021) was more complicated. In 2020, during the coronavirus pandemic, the presidency delayed action and federal agencies faced interference from the presidency, despite the federal government traditionally dealing with matters of national importance, including natural disasters or virus outbreaks. This would suggest that Trump attempted to weaken the role of the federal government, although he also attempted to override state powers or exercise powers that the Constitution did not grant the presidency. Punitive federalism, or the punishment of states and local areas by the federal government, became an issue during the Trump administration. Goelzhauser and Konisky state that punitive federalism is exemplified most by the Trump administration's interference with California through the EPA in 2018, and the withholding of disaster relief from Puerto Rico. They further state that "the pandemic has brought on, in addition to immense human suffering, the federalism event of the century". Another issue was Trump's response to the Black Lives Matter protests, in which he took a more confrontational stance, including deploying federal troops and agents to protests, despite several states opposing this measure and the action being condemned for possible unconstitutionality. According to Thompson, Wong, and Rabe, "Trump [was] particularly aggressive in the use of executive power, or the 'administrative presidency', to pursue his goals, including executive orders and regulatory changes." However, "the forces of federalism, especially state attorneys general, governors, and legislatures, have often undercut Trump's executive initiatives and reduced their impact".

==== Presidency of Joe Biden ====
The federalism of the Biden administration is an emerging discussion. One federalism topic includes the measures available to the federal government in combatting the COVID-19 pandemic, and the promotion of public health.

== See also ==
- Anti-Federalists
- States' rights
- Laboratories of democracy
- Tenth Amendment to the United States Constitution
- Federalist Society

== References and further reading ==
- Gerston, Larry N. (2007), American Federalism: A Concise Introduction, Armonk, New York: M.E. Sharp, ISBN 978-0-7656-1671-5
- Hafer, Catherine; Landa, Dimitri (August 2007). "Public goods in Federal systems". Quarterly Journal of Political Science. 2 (3). Now Publishing Inc.: 253–275. doi:10.1561/100.00006001. Pdf.
- LaCroix, Alison L. (2010), The Ideological Origins of American Federalism, Cambridge, Massachusetts: Harvard University Press, ISBN 978-0-674-04886-7
- Lowi, Theodore (1995), The End of the Republican Era, Norman: University of Oklahoma, ISBN 0-8061-2887-9
- Taylor, Jeff (2013), Politics on a Human Scale: The American Tradition of Decentralism, Lanham, Maryland: Lexington Books, ISBN 978-0-7391-8674-9
- U.S. Constitution
- Zavodnyik, Peter (2011), The Rise of the Federal Colossus: The Growth of Federal Power from Lincoln to F.D.R., Santa Barbara, California: ABC-CLIO
- Phelps, Richard P. (2023), The Malfunction of US Education Policy: Elite Misinformation, Disinformation, and Selfishness, Lanham, Maryland: Rowman and Littlefield, ISBN 978-1-4758-6994-1
