= Tenther movement =

Social movement in the United States

The Tenther movement is a social movement in the United States, whose adherents espouse the political ideology that the federal government's enumerated powers must be read very narrowly to exclude much of what the federal government already does, citing the Tenth Amendment to the United States Constitution in support of this. The text of the amendment reads:

The powers not delegated to the United States by the Constitution, nor prohibited by it to the States, are reserved to the States respectively, or to the people.

At various times, the Supreme Court has interpreted the Tenth Amendment in different ways –some of which have been more sympathetic to the so-called "Tenther movement." For much of the mid-twentieth century, the Court held that the Amendment does not require a narrow interpretation of the federal government's enumerated powers. During this time, the Court held that the powers of the federal government derive from the states voluntarily surrendering part of their sovereign powers. This view was reiterated in United States v. Darby Lumber in which the Court stated that the Tenth Amendment "states but a truism that all [powers of the State Sovereign] is retained which has not been surrendered [by ratification of the Constitution and membership in the United States]". However, the Court later retreated from this view of the Tenth Amendment. Beginning in 1976 with National League of Cities v. Usery, and continuing with New York v. United States (1992), Printz v. United States (1997), Murphy v. National Collegiate Athletic Association (2018), and Haaland v. Brackeen (2023), the Court used the Tenth Amendment to construe the federal government's powers more narrowly.

In summary, members of the Tenther Movement believe that the Tenth Amendment should be interpreted as requiring that the federal government's enumerated powers be construed narrowly.

== Political and social positions ==
Tenthers oppose a broad range of federal government programs, including the war on drugs, federal surveillance and other limitations on privacy and civil and economic liberties, plus numerous New Deal legislation and, more recently, Great Society legislation such as Medicaid, Medicare, the VA health system and the G.I. Bill.

=== Comparison with other movements ===
==== Libertarianism ====
The Tenther movement is distinct from libertarianism, although adherents of the two philosophies often have similar positions. Whereas libertarians oppose programs such as the war on drugs on ideological grounds, seeing them as unjustified government intrusion into lives of its citizens, Tenthers hold that such programs may be perfectly acceptable, but only when implemented by individual states.

==== States' rights ====
Tenthers argue for the recognition of limited sovereignty of the states. Opponents use the term in order to draw parallels between adherents and 19th century states' rights secessionists as well as the movement to resist federal civil rights legislation. Tentherism was also one of the justifications cited by pro-slavery advocate John Calhoun before the Civil War.

== Media appearances ==
Joni Ernst, a Republican Senator since 2015, said in a September 2013 forum held by the Iowa Faith and Freedom Coalition while she was a member of the Iowa Senate that Congress should not bother to pass laws "that the states would consider nullifying", referring to what she describes as "200-plus years of federal legislators going against the Tenth Amendment's states' rights". Ernst's statements were criticized in an article published by the United Press International on the grounds that they were based upon a misunderstanding of Tenth Amendment case law.

In a weblog post for Reason, journalist Radley Balko objected to Tenthers being dismissed out of hand and lumped in with Birthers and Truthers, crediting their close reading of the Tenth Amendment (in a back-handed compliment given case law and historical experience) for "a daft sort of logic"

== Bills against mass surveillance ==
In 2013 and 2014, the group successfully introduced bills in state legislatures based on the model act the Fourth Amendment Protection Act. The intent of the bills was to prevent state governments from co-operating with the National Security Agency's mass surveillance projects, by forbidding state universities from doing NSA research or from hosting NSA recruiters, or preventing the provision of water to NSA facilities. Bills were introduced in Kansas, Missouri, Oklahoma, California, Utah, Washington, and Arizona.

== See also ==
- Constitutionalism
- Interposition
- New Federalism
- Nullification (U.S. Constitution)
- Posse Comitatus (organization)
- Sovereign citizen movement
