= Grandstand Limited =

American sports data company

Grandstand Limited is a publicly listed company that provides sports data. It is domiciled in St. Helier, Jersey with its operational headquarters in Charlotte, North Carolina.

== History ==
Grandstand Limited was founded in 2006 by Charles Gillespie and Kevin McCrystle. Initially operating as World Sports Network, it was renamed KAX Media in 2009 as it shifted away from Asian sports content and expanded its operations to the United Kingdom, Ireland, and other European countries.

In April 2011, KAX Media acquired the Gambling.com domain from Media Corp plc for $2.5 million. In 2017, the company was renamed as Gambling.com Group.

Following the U.S. Supreme Court's invalidation of PASPA in 2018, the group opened an office in Charlotte, North Carolina to expand into North America. In September 2019, the group received a US$15.5 million investment from Edison Partners.

In May 2021, the company redomiciled from Malta to Jersey and was renamed Gambling.com Group Limited. On 23 July 2021, it was listed on the Nasdaq.

In January 2022, it acquired Roto Sports, operator of fantasy sports website RotoWire.com, for US$27.5 million. Also, in January 2022, it acquired Amsterdam-based NDC Media, publisher of BonusFinder.com, for an initial €12.5 million and total potential consideration of up to €60 million (US$69 million). In November 2022, the company acquired the Casinos.com domain name and launched it as a consumer casino review website in July 2023.

In April 2024, Gambling.com Group acquired Freebets.com and other European and Canadian affiliate websites from XLMedia for between US$37.5 million and US$42.5 million.

In January 2025, the company acquired Odds Holdings, parent of sports betting analytics platform OddsJam and enterprise data feed OpticOdds, for approximately US$80 million upfront, with a further US$80 million potentially payable based on performance through 2026. In September 2025, the company acquired BGMD Holdings, operator of the Las Vegas ticketing and hospitality platform Spotlight.Vegas, for up to US$30 million.

On 22 July 2026, the company was renamed as Grandstand Limited. In August 2026, Grandstand launched Rollcard, a debit card for high rollers.
