= STATES Act =

Proposed legislation in United States Congress

Strengthening the Tenth Amendment Through Entrusting States (STATES) Act
- Long title: To amend the Controlled Substances Act to provide for a new rule regarding the application of the Act to marihuana, and for other purposes.

Legislative history
- Introduced in the Senate by Cory Gardner (R-CO) on June 7, 2018

The Strengthening the Tenth Amendment Through Entrusting States (STATES) Act (S. 3032) was a bill proposed in the 115th United States Congress that would recognize legalization of cannabis and the U.S. state laws that have legalized it through their legislatures or citizen initiative.

It was introduced on June 7, 2018, by Senators Cory Gardner (Republican from Colorado) and Elizabeth Warren (Democrat from Massachusetts). A companion bill was introduced the same day in the House of Representatives, sponsored by Earl Blumenauer (Democrat from Oregon) and David Joyce (Republican from Ohio).

The act would amend the Controlled Substances Act of 1970 to exempt from federal enforcement individuals or corporations in states who are in compliance with U.S. state, U.S. territory and the District of Columbia, or tribal law on cannabis, with certain additional provisions such as minimum ages. The banking provisions of the STATES Act have been reintroduced as the Secure and Fair Enforcement (SAFE) Banking Act of 2019 in the 116th U.S. Congress by Ed Perlmutter (Democrat from Colorado) in the House, and by Jeff Merkley (Democrat from Oregon) in the Senate.

As of September 18, 2019, the House bill had 206 cosponsors, and the Senate bill had 33 cosponsors.

== History ==
According to Voice of America, "The impetus for the legislation was a decision by Attorney General Jeff Sessions in January to rescind Obama-era Justice Department guidelines that encouraged prosecutors to adopt a hands-off approach to marijuana law enforcement in states where the substance was legal", referring to the Cole Memorandum provisions rescinded on January 4, 2018.

On April 25, 2018, Senators Cory Gardner and Elizabeth Warren announced that they would introduce a bipartisan bill to prevent Federal interference with states that had legalized marijuana. The announcement came a few days after Senator Gardner spoke with President Trump and announced that he had received assurances that the President would support such legislation. As of late April, the details of the bill were unannounced but analysts said it "would not legalize cannabis nationally, but would allow each state the options of legalizing recreational or medical cannabis, or to continue to prohibit the plant entirely" and had announced the name of the bill.

On June 7, 2018, Warren introduced the bill in the U.S. Senate and Representative David Joyce introduced a companion bill in the U.S. House of Representatives. The Senate bill was referred to the Senate Judiciary Committee and the House bill was referred to the House Judiciary Committee and the House Energy and Commerce Committee. In December 2018, Gardner attempted to attach the bill as an amendment to the First Step Act, a criminal justice reform bill being debated in the Senate during the lame-duck session of the 115th U.S. Congress, but was blocked by a procedural maneuver from Senate Majority Leader Mitch McConnell.

== Legislation tracker ==
- The STATES Act was reintroduced in the 116th Congress on April 4, 2019, in both the House (H.R.2093) and the Senate (S.1028).
- The STATES Act was reintroduced in the 118th Congress on December 7, 2023 as H.R. 6673, also called STATES 2.0.
- STATES 2.0 Act was reintroduced in the 119th Congress on April 17, 2025.

== Cosponsors and support ==
=== Senate ===
1. Sen. Elizabeth Warren (Democratic-MA; original sponsor)
2. Sen. Cory Gardner (Republican-CO; original cosponsor)
3. Sen. Rand Paul (Republican-KY; original cosponsor)
4. Sen. Catherine Cortez Masto (Democratic-NV; original cosponsor)
5. Sen. Lisa Murkowski (Republican-AK; original cosponsor)
6. Sen. Cory Booker (Democratic-NJ; original cosponsor; Senate Judiciary Committee Member)
7. Sen. Dan Sullivan (Republican-AK; original cosponsor)
8. Sen. Michael Bennet (Democratic-CO; original cosponsor)
9. Sen. Jeff Flake (Republican-AZ; cosponsored on June 18, 2018; Senate Judiciary Committee Member)
10. Sen. Amy Klobuchar (Democratic-MN; cosponsored on June 18, 2018; Senate Judiciary Committee Member)
11. Sen. Dianne Feinstein (Democratic-CA; cosponsored on September 12, 2018; Senate Judiciary Committee Ranking Member)

=== House ===
1. Rep. David Joyce (Republican OH-14; original sponsor)
2. Rep. Earl Blumenauer (Democratic OR-3; original cosponsor)
3. Rep. Carlos Curbelo (Republican FL-26; original cosponsor)
4. Rep. Jared Polis (Democratic CO-2; original cosponsor)
5. Rep. Ken Buck (Republican CO-4; original cosponsor; House Judiciary Committee Member)
6. Rep. Barbara Lee (Democratic CA-13; original cosponsor)
7. Rep. Walter B. Jones Jr. (Republican NC-3; original cosponsor)
8. Rep. Diana DeGette (Democratic CO-1; original cosponsor; House Energy and Commerce Committee Member)
9. Rep. Rod Blum (Republican IA-1; original cosponsor)
10. Rep. Steve Cohen (Democratic TN-9; original cosponsor; House Judiciary Committee Member)
11. Rep. Matt Gaetz (Republican FL-1; original cosponsor; House Judiciary Committee Member)
12. Del. Eleanor Holmes Norton (Democratic DC-AL; original cosponsor; non-voting member)
13. Rep. Tom McClintock (Republican CA-4; original cosponsor)
14. Rep. Lou Correa (Democratic CA-46; original cosponsor)
15. Rep. Jason Lewis (Republican MN-2; original cosponsor)
16. Rep. Ro Khanna (Democratic CA-17; original cosponsor)
17. Rep. Justin Amash (Republican MI-3; cosponsored on June 8, 2018)
18. Rep. Charlie Crist (Democratic FL-13; cosponsored on June 8, 2018)
19. Rep. Dana Rohrabacher (Republican CA-48; cosponsored on June 12, 2018)
20. Rep. Dina Titus (Democratic NV-1; cosponsored on June 12, 2018)
21. Rep. Mike Coffman (Republican CO-6; cosponsored on June 14, 2018)
22. Rep. Jacky Rosen (Democratic NV-3; cosponsored on June 14, 2018)
23. Rep. Thomas Massie (Republican KY-4; cosponsored on July 10, 2018)
24. Rep. Ed Perlmutter (Democratic CO-7; cosponsored on July 10, 2018)
25. Rep. Duncan D. Hunter (Republican CA-50; cosponsored on July 25, 2018)
26. Rep. Chellie Pingree (Democratic ME-1; cosponsored on July 25, 2018)
27. Rep. Raúl Labrador (Republican ID-1; cosponsored on August 10, 2018; House Judiciary Committee Member)
28. Rep. Tim Ryan (Democratic OH-13; cosponsored on August 10, 2018)
29. Rep. Ryan Costello (Republican PA-6; cosponsored on September 6, 2018; House Energy and Commerce Committee Member)
30. Rep. Suzanne Bonamici (Democratic OR-1; cosponsored on September 6, 2018)
31. Rep. Adam Smith (Democratic WA-9; cosponsored on December 10, 2018)
32. Del. Madeleine Bordallo (Democratic GU-AL; cosponsored on December 10, 2018; non-voting member)
33. Rep. Jim McGovern (Democratic MA-2; cosponsored on December 10, 2018)
34. Rep. Tulsi Gabbard (Democratic HI-2; cosponsored on December 10, 2018)
35. Rep. Suzan DelBene (Democratic WA-1; cosponsored on December 10, 2018)
36. Rep. Beto O'Rourke (Democratic TX-16; cosponsored on December 10, 2018)
37. Rep. Denny Heck (Democratic WA-10; cosponsored on December 10, 2018)
38. Rep. Jared Huffman (Democratic CA-2; cosponsored on December 11, 2018)
39. Rep. Brad Sherman (Democratic CA-30; cosponsored on December 11, 2018)
40. Rep. Zoe Lofgren (Democratic CA-19; cosponsored on December 11, 2018; House Judiciary Committee Member)
41. Rep. Peter DeFazio (Democratic OR-4; cosponsored on December 11, 2018)
42. Rep. Michelle Lujan Grisham (Democratic NM-1; cosponsored on December 12, 2018)
43. Rep. Darren Soto (Democratic FL-9; cosponsored on December 12, 2018)
44. Rep. Betty McCollum (Democratic MN-4; cosponsored on December 12, 2018)
45. Rep. Rick Nolan (Democratic MN-8; cosponsored on December 12, 2018)
46. Rep. Adam Schiff (Democratic CA-28; cosponsored on December 13, 2018)

=== State governors ===
1. Gov. Bill Walker (Independent-AK; signed letter of support on June 8, 2018)
2. Gov. Jerry Brown (Democratic-CA; signed letter of support on June 8, 2018)
3. Gov. John Hickenlooper (Democratic-CO; signed letter of support on June 8, 2018)
4. Gov. Larry Hogan (Republican-MD; signed letter of support on June 8, 2018)
5. Gov. Charlie Baker (Republican-MA; signed letter of support on June 8, 2018)
6. Gov. Brian Sandoval (Republican-NV; signed letter of support on June 8, 2018)
7. Gov. Phil Murphy (Democratic-NJ; signed letter of support on June 8, 2018)
8. Gov. Andrew Cuomo (Democratic-NY; signed letter of support on June 8, 2018)
9. Gov. Doug Burgum (Republican-ND; signed letter of support on June 8, 2018)
10. Gov. Kate Brown (Democratic-OR; signed letter of support on June 8, 2018)
11. Gov. Tom Wolf (Democratic-PA; signed letter of support on June 8, 2018)
12. Gov. Jay Inslee (Democratic-WA; signed letter of support on June 8, 2018)

=== Native American tribes ===
The Suquamish Tribe in Washington State, one of the first tribes with legal cannabis sales, indicated support for the bill.

== Reactions ==
President Donald Trump said he "probably will end up supporting" the bill on June 8, 2018. The same day, twelve governors, from West Coast states that had legalized cannabis for adult use, plus Maryland, New Jersey, New York, North Dakota and Pennsylvania, sent a letter to Congress urging passage of the measure.

The Los Angeles Times's editorial board endorsed the proposal under a headline that said it was "kickstarting Congress' effort to legalize marijuana".

A spokesperson for the Marijuana Policy Project called the STATES Act "the most significant piece of marijuana-related legislation ever introduced in Congress."

Writing for Above the Law, a legal analysis website for attorneys, cannabis law specialist Hilary Bricken wrote that it was "for the first time ever, a real and legitimate bipartisan 'respect states' rights' effort" on "meaningful marijuana law reform at the Congressional level".

In testimony to the Senate Appropriations Committee on April 10, 2019, then-Attorney General William Barr said he preferred the legislation over the "intolerable" status quo of conflicting state and federal laws.

According to NORML political director Justin Strekal, as of 2019 the STATES Act is looking basic and dated compared to newer legislation that goes beyond carving out exceptions to prohibition to remove cannabis from the Controlled Substances Act entirely, take steps to repair prohibition's harms, forgive past criminal convictions, and build an equitable industry.

== See also ==
- State legislation in protest of federal law in the United States § Cannabis laws
- SAFE Banking Act
