= McClintock–Polis Amendment =

Proposed US law regarding cannabis businesses

- Long title: H.Amdt. 334 (McClintock) to H.R. 2578: An amendment to prohibit the use of funds by various states to prevent any of them from implementing their own laws that authorize the use, distribution, possessions, or cultivation of marijuana on non-Federal lands within their respective jurisdictions.
- Announced in: the 114th United States Congress
- Sponsored by: Tom McClintock (R–CA)

The McClintock–Polis Amendment was a proposal to forbid federal prosecution of state-legal cannabis businesses in compliance with their state's laws, sponsored by Tom McClintock and Jared Polis in the US House of Representatives. Its third introduction followed rescission of the Cole Memorandum by the incoming United States Attorney General in January 2018. The amendment would replace administrative protections of the Cole Memorandum with legislative ones parallel to the provisions of the Rohrabacher–Farr amendment for medical marijuana. The measure was voted down in 2016, 222 to 206. It would have been the first time such legislation was passed in U.S. Congress.

It was reintroduced in 2019 as the Blumenauer–McClintock–Norton Amendment with new sponsors including Earl Blumenauer, and passed 267–165, but not ratified by the U.S. Senate. In 2020, the Blumenauer–McClintock–Norton–Lee Amendment with new sponsor Barbara Lee passed 254–163 in the House and met the same fate in the Senate.

== Background ==
Prohibition of cannabis in every part of the United States, which dated to the 1930s, began to be rolled back by U.S. states independent of the federal government in with the first wave of decriminalization in the 1970s. In 1996, California voters approved medical cannabis, and by the 2010s, medical cannabis was legalized by several states. Adult use was first legalized by Colorado and Washington in 2012.

The U.S. Congressional Research Service has stated that "limiting federal marijuana regulation through means such as appropriations provisions" is a way to relieve the contradictory legality of cannabis according to state and federal law.

== Proposed amendment ==
"The McClintock amendment introduced in 2015 would have protected all recreational marijuana programs in states like Colorado—a full step beyond Rohrabacher–Farr, which protects only medical marijuana programs." A substantially similar or identically worded amendment was introduced by the same sponsors in 2017. The 2017 introduction during the first Trump administration came due to "fear the Trump administration could take a more aggressive approach to enforcing the federal ban on marijuana" and was considered by advocacy group National Organization for the Reform of Marijuana Laws "especially important with [prohibitionist] Jeff Sessions as Attorney General".

== Opposition ==
Notable opposition to the 2015 amendment came from John Fleming and, according to Rockefeller Institute of Government, many of the votes against the 2018 amendment were because congressmen feared the House Rules Committee, chaired by Texas Republican Pete Sessions, an opponent of legalization.

== Impact ==
A story covering the amendment was one of Denver Post's top 10 most popular stories of 2018.

== See also ==
- Cannabis policy of the Obama administration
- Cannabis policy of the first Trump administration
