= Printz v. United States =

- Supreme Court of the United States

Argued December 3, 1996 Decided June 27, 1997
- Full case name: Jay Printz, Sheriff/Coroner, Ravalli County, Montana, Petitioner 95-1478 v. United States; Richard Mack, Petitioner 95-1503 v. United States
- Citations: 521 U.S. 898 (more) 117 S. Ct. 2365; 138 L. Ed. 2d 914; 1997 U.S. LEXIS 4044; 97 Cal. Daily Op. Service 5096; 97 Daily Journal DAR 8213; 11 Fla. L. Weekly Fed. S 224

Case history
- Prior: declaring unconstitutional, 854 F. Supp. 1503 (D. Mont. 1994), same, 856 F. Supp. 1372 (D. Ariz. 1994), reversing, 66 F.3d 1025 (9th Cir. 1995).

Holding
- The Brady Handgun Violence Prevention Act's interim provision commanding the "chief law enforcement officer" (CLEO) of each local jurisdiction to conduct background checks, §922(s)(2), is unconstitutional.

Court membership
- Chief Justice William Rehnquist Associate Justices John P. Stevens · Sandra Day O'Connor; Antonin Scalia · Anthony Kennedy; David Souter · Clarence Thomas; Ruth Bader Ginsburg · Stephen Breyer

Case opinions
- Majority: Scalia, joined by Rehnquist, O'Connor, Kennedy, Thomas
- Concurrence: O'Connor
- Concurrence: Thomas
- Dissent: Stevens, joined by Souter, Ginsburg, Breyer
- Dissent: Souter
- Dissent: Breyer, joined by Stevens

Laws applied
- U.S. Const. amend. X; Brady Handgun Violence Prevention Act, Pub. L. 103-159, 107 Stat. 1536

Printz v. United States, 521 U.S. 898 (1997), was a United States Supreme Court case in which the court held that certain interim provisions of the Brady Handgun Violence Prevention Act violated the Tenth Amendment to the United States Constitution.

== Background ==
=== The Gun Control Act of 1968 ===
The Gun Control Act of 1968 (GCA), Pub. L 90-618 and subsequent amendments established a detailed federal program governing the distribution of firearms. The GCA prohibited firearms ownership by certain broad categories of individuals thought to pose a threat to public safety: convicted felons, convicted misdemeanor domestic violence or stalking offenders, persons with an outstanding felony warrant, fugitives from justice, unlawful aliens, persons with court-mandated protective orders issued against them, persons who have been involuntarily committed to a mental health facility, adjudicated mentally ill by a court, and others.

Persons disqualified from firearms ownership for mental health reasons can apply to have this disability removed. States that do not maintain an application process to allow persons disqualified for mental health reasons to obtain relief from firearms prohibition face Justice Assistance Grant penalties. Section 105 of the NICS Improvement Amendments Act of 2007 (NIAA), cited as Pub. L. 110–180, § 105, provides for restoration of firearm ownership rights in mental health cases. Under NIAA it is up to each U.S. state to come up with its own application process; thus the procedure to regain one's rights varies from state-to-state.

=== The Brady Act ===
On November 30, 1993, President Bill Clinton signed into law the Brady Handgun Violence Prevention Act, Pub. L. 103–159, amending the 1968 Gun Control Act. This "Brady Bill" required the United States Attorney General to establish an electronic or phone-based background check to prevent firearms sales to persons already prohibited from owning firearms. This check, entitled the National Instant Criminal Background Check System (NICS), went into effect as required on November 30, 1998.

=== Interim provisions ===
The act also immediately put in place certain interim provisions until that system became operative. Under the interim provisions, a firearms dealer who proposes to transfer a handgun must receive from the transferee a statement (the Brady Form), containing the transferee's name and address, and the date the proposed transfer is to take place, along with a sworn statement that the transferee is not among any of the classes of prohibited purchasers, verify the identity of the transferee by examining an identification document, and provide the "chief law enforcement officer" (CLEO) of the transferee's residence with notice of the contents (and a copy) of the Brady Form.

When a CLEO receives the required notice of a proposed transfer, they must "make a reasonable effort to ascertain within 5 business days whether receipt or possession would be in violation of the law, including research in whatever State and local recordkeeping systems are available and in a national system designated by the Attorney General."

=== The plaintiffs ===
Petitioners sheriffs Jay Printz and Richard Mack, the Chief Law Enforcement Officers for Ravalli County, Montana, and Graham County, Arizona, represented by Stephen Halbrook and David T. Hardy respectively, filed separate actions challenging the constitutionality of the Brady Act's interim provisions. They objected to the use of congressional action to compel state officers to execute federal law.

=== Lower court decisions ===
On May 16, 1994, United States District Judge Charles C. Lovell granted the sheriffs declaratory judgment, finding that the provision requiring CLEOs to perform background checks violated the Tenth Amendment to the United States Constitution, but also concluding that provision was severable from the remainder of the act, effectively leaving a voluntary background check system in place. On June 29, 1994, United States District Judge John Roll reached the same conclusion. Those judgments were reversed on September 8, 1995, by United States Court of Appeals for the Ninth Circuit Judge William C. Canby Jr., joined by Judge Herbert Choy, over the dissent of Judge Ferdinand Francis Fernandez.

The Second Circuit also rejected a sheriff's challenge to the mandate, but the Fifth Circuit found that the mandate was unconstitutional, creating a circuit split.

== Supreme Court ==
The Montana and Arizona sheriffs' petition for a writ of certiorari was granted and one hour of oral arguments were heard on December 3, 1996, where Stephen Halbrook appeared for the sheriffs and Walter E. Dellinger III, the acting Solicitor General of the United States, appeared for the Government.

=== Opinion of the Court ===
On June 27, 1997, the last day of the term, the Supreme Court reversed the Ninth Circuit Court of Appeals. Justice Antonin Scalia, joined by Chief Justice William Rehnquist alongside Justices Sandra Day O'Connor, Anthony Kennedy, and Clarence Thomas, found that the Brady Bill's attempted commandeering of the sheriffs to perform background checks violated the Tenth Amendment to the United States Constitution. In writing the majority opinion of the court, Justice Scalia stated that, although there is no constitutional text precisely responding to the challenge, an answer can be found "in historical understanding and practice, the structure of the Constitution, and in the jurisprudence of this Court."

==== Historical understanding and practice ====
Justice Scalia's opinion held that early acts of Congress imposing obligations on state judges were not evidence of federal power over state officials because the Madisonian Compromise had agreed to leave the creation of lower federal courts optional. He rejected the Government's argument that Federalist No. 36, Federalist No. 45, and Federalist No. 27 anticipated that Congress would "make use" of state officials. Rather, he viewed "almost two centuries of apparent congressional avoidance of the practice" as strong evidence that Congressmen did not think they had the power to command state officials.

==== The structure of the Constitution ====
Scalia explained that federalism in the United States is based upon "dual sovereignty", quoting Federalist No. 39's assurance that states retain "a residual and inviolable sovereignty". He stated that the Framers designed the Constitution to allow federal regulation of international and interstate matters, not internal matters reserved to the state legislatures.

Scalia expressed his worry that members of Congress might take credit for "solving" a problem with policies that impose all the financial and administrative burden, as well as the blame, on local officials. He quoted Federalist No. 51's argument that by giving voters control over dual sovereign governments, "a double security arises to the rights of the people. The different governments will control each other, at the same time that each will be controlled by itself." He therefore concluded that allowing the federal government to draft the police officers of the 50 states into its service would increase its powers far beyond what the Constitution intended.

He then identified an additional structural problem with commandeering the sheriffs: it violated the constitutional separation of powers by robbing the President of the United States of his power to execute the laws; contradicting the "unitary executive theory". He argued:

We have thus far discussed the effect that federal control of state officers would have upon the first element of the "double security" alluded to by Madison: the division of power between State and Federal Governments. It would also have an effect upon the second element: the separation and equilibration of powers between the three branches of the Federal Government itself. The Constitution does not leave to speculation who is to administer the laws enacted by Congress; the President, it says, "shall take Care that the Laws be faithfully executed," Art. II, §3, personally and through officers whom he appoints (save for such inferior officers as Congress may authorize to be appointed by the "Courts of Law" or by "the Heads of Departments" who with other presidential appointees), Art. II, §2. The Brady Act effectively transfers this responsibility to thousands of CLEOs in the 50 States, who are left to implement the program without meaningful Presidential control (if indeed meaningful Presidential control is possible without the power to appoint and remove). The insistence of the Framers upon unity in the Federal Executive—to insure both vigor and accountability—is well known. See The Federalist No. 70 (A. Hamilton); 2 Documentary History of the Ratification of the Constitution 495 (M. Jensen ed. 1976) (statement of James Wilson); see also Calabresi & Prakash, The President's Power to Execute the Laws, 104 Yale L. J. 541 (1994). That unity would be shattered, and the power of the President would be subject to reduction, if Congress could act as effectively without the President as with him, by simply requiring state officers to execute its laws

Finally, Scalia applied the court's past jurisprudence. The Government had argued that the anti-commandeering doctrine established in New York v. United States (1992), which held that Congress could not command state legislatures to either pass a law or take ownership of nuclear waste, did not apply to state executive officials. Rejecting the Government's argument, Scalia held that the Tenth Amendment categorically forbids the federal government from commanding state officials directly. As such, the Brady Act's mandate on the sheriffs to perform background checks was held unconstitutional.

Justice O'Connor wrote a concurring opinion highlighting that the court's holding left local Chief Law Enforcement Officers free to voluntarily comply with the federal mandate.

Justice Thomas also concurred, clarifying that, in his opinion, Congress's interstate Commerce Clause powers do not apply to purely intrastate firearm transfers. Thomas went on to urge the court to consider in a future case whether the Second Amendment grants individuals a personal right to own firearms and to consider the "colorable argument" that any federal gun laws would violate that right.

=== Dissents ===
Justice John Paul Stevens wrote a dissenting opinion, joined by Justices David Souter, Ruth Bader Ginsburg, and Stephen Breyer. Justice Stevens suggested that the Commerce Clause of the Constitution, giving the federal government the right to regulate handgun sales, could be coupled with the Necessary and Proper Clause, giving Congress the power to pass whatever laws are necessary and proper to carry out its previously enumerated power. The Tenth Amendment, Stevens argued, contains no additional limitations on federal power, serving merely to clarify that the Government has only those powers granted by the Constitution.

Stevens further extolled the benefits of cooperative federalism. He argued that federal direction of state officials in the manner implicated by the Brady Bill was analogous to ordering the mass inoculation of children to forestall an epidemic or directing state officials to respond to a terrorist threat. He was very concerned with the ability of the federal government to respond to a national emergency and did not believe that "there is anything in the 10th amendment 'in historical understanding and practice, in the structure of the Constitution, or in the jurisprudence of this Court,' that forbids the enlistment of state officers to make that response effective." Moreover, according to Stevens' opinion, the text of the Constitution did not support the majority's apparent proposition that "a local police officer can ignore a command contained in a statute enacted by Congress pursuant to an express delegation of power enumerated in Article I."

Justice Souter dissented separately, emphasizing that he read Federalist No. 27 as providing ample evidence that the Framers' original intent was to require states to act as auxiliaries of the federal government to some extent.

Justice Breyer also dissented separately, joined by Justice Stevens, using international comparative law to observe that the federalism found in many foreign countries gives the central government some authority over sub-national jurisdictions.

== Subsequent developments ==
The immediate effects of the ruling on the Brady Bill were negligible. The vast majority of local and state law enforcement officials supported the interim provisions and were happy to comply with the background checks. The issue ended with the completion of the federal background check database. However, Printz v. United States was an important ruling in support of states' rights and the New Federalism.

Professor Ann Althouse has suggested that Printz applies to the U.S. government response to the September 11 attacks because "state and local government autonomy can exert pressure on the federal government to moderate its efforts and take care not to offend constitutional rights."

In District of Columbia v. Heller (2008), the court ruled that the Constitution protects an individual's personal right to own firearms. The Heller decision led to the Supreme Court cases McDonald v. City of Chicago (2010), which incorporated the 2nd Amendment against the states, and New York State Rifle & Pistol Association, Inc. v. Bruen (2022), where the court ruled that the Second Amendment protects the right to carry a pistol in public.

== See also ==
- New York v. United States (1992) (finding that Congress cannot commandeer states' legislative functions)
- United States v. Lopez (1995) (finding that Congress has no Commerce Clause power over bringing guns near school zones)
- List of United States Supreme Court cases, volume 521
- List of United States Supreme Court cases
- Lists of United States Supreme Court cases by volume
