= PropSwap =

Marketplace for sports betting tickets

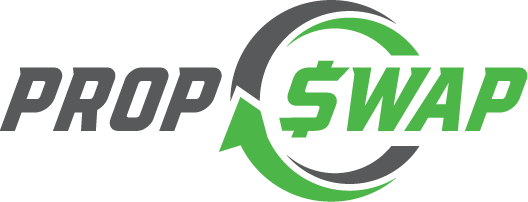
- Type: Online marketplace
- Industry: Sports betting
- Founded: August 2015
- Founders: Luke Pergande and Ian Epstein
- Website: propswap.com

PropSwap is an online marketplace that allows users to buy and sell sports betting tickets.

== History ==
The idea for PropSwap came about in October 2013, when Luke Pergande reached out to his friend Ian Epstein asking if a marketplace to legally sell his Super Bowl bet existed. They were unsure about the website's legality and hired an attorney to present their case to the gaming commission. The company launched in 2015 with the approval of the Nevada Gaming Control Board.

The company operates similarly to online marketplaces such as eBay and StubHub. The site takes a commission fee from both the buyer and seller. It originally required sellers to carry out transactions with physical tickets in person at a terminal located inside a sports bar in Las Vegas. This later changed to allow electronic transactions.

Initially, the company was only able to operate within Nevada due to restrictions imposed by the Professional and Amateur Sports Protection Act of 1992, which prohibited sports betting outside the state. However, in May 2018, the Supreme Court overturned PASPA, which allowed the company to expand its operations nationwide. It launched in Atlantic City, New Jersey in 2018.

Tickets on the site had an average sale price of $250 as of 2019. In 2016, a $100 ticket predicting that Lamar Jackson to win the Heisman Trophy, sold on the marketplace for $10,000 just days before the Trophy announcement. In January 2019, Clay Travis and Cousin Sal bought a ticket for $57,000, predicting the New Orleans Saints would win Super Bowl LIII.

In October 2019, PropSwap launched a new online platform. The company experienced a rapid increase in revenue and user growth in 2020. In March 2020, the COVID-19 pandemic caused the cancellation of the NCAA Tournament, and the website returned its commissions and requested sellers to give back profits to buyers.

In 2021, the company completed a $2 million capital raise. Its total funding raised as of October 2022 is $5 million.

== See also ==
- Sports betting
- Online marketplace
