= Centsports =

Defunct online gambling website

CentSports
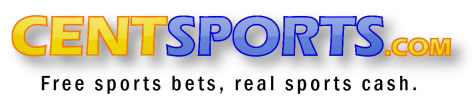
- Industry: Online gambling
- Founded: November 22, 2007
- Founder: Victor Palmer
- Defunct: November 2011
- Fate: Acquired
- Successor: FreeSportsBet.com
- Headquarters: College Station, Texas, USA
- Key people: Victor Palmer, Wilfried Schobeiri (CTO)
- Website: www.centsports.com

Centsports was a company founded in late November 2007 by Texas A&M graduate Victor Palmer. It was notable for being regarded as providing a legal way to play online gambling and sports betting games in the United States. In August 2011, CentSports was acquired by FreeSportsBet.com.

== Legality ==
In the heyday of CentSports, online gambling was illegal throughout the United States. Most states consider that "gambling" consists of three elements: prize, chance and "consideration," or providing something of value to be eligible to participate. As Centsports did not allow users to fund their accounts with their own money, and instead funded betting accounts with revenue from its advertisers, "consideration" from the bettor was not involved, and therefore the games were considered legal. However, the NCAA's Agent, Gambling and Amateurism Activities division stated that engaging in Centsports-style gaming "would be in violation of NCAA sports wagering legislation."

== Revenue and usage ==
Centsports earned revenue through advertising from such sponsors as Pizza Hut, Skype, and the NBA. Using this revenue, it funded gaming accounts with 10 cents. If a user accumulated a minimum of $20, the user could then compete in brackets to cash-out the winnings. Checks were mailed to winners. If a user lost all of his or her money, the user could start over with 10 cents.

The site allowed users to bet on a variety of sporting events, including football, basketball, boxing and auto racing, across amateur and professional leagues, in several countries.

The site grew its user base through a "crony system," where a user would invite others to join the site, and would receive a 5% bonus on the winnings the invited users made. As of 2010, Centsports had about three-quarters of a million members; about 40% were college students.

== See also ==
- PropSwap
