= New Federalism =

Transfer of certain powers from the United States federal government back to the states

New Federalism is a political philosophy of devolution, or the transfer of certain powers from the United States federal government back to the states. The primary objective of New Federalism, unlike that of the eighteenth-century political philosophy of Federalism, is the restoration of some of the autonomy and power, which individual states had lost to the federal government as a result of President Franklin Roosevelt's New Deal policies. Many of the ideas of New Federalism originated with Richard Nixon.

As a policy theme, New Federalism typically involves the federal government providing block grants to the states to resolve a social issue. The federal government then monitors outcomes but provides broad discretion to the states for how the programs are implemented. Advocates of this approach sometimes cite a quotation from a dissent by Louis Brandeis in New State Ice Co. v. Liebmann:

== Nixon Administration ==
Richard Nixon presented New Federalism as a domestic policy agenda in 1969. His proposals included welfare reform, changes to job training and antipoverty programs, and revenue sharing with state and local governments. Congress approved general revenue sharing in 1972. The program distributed funds to state governments until 1981 and to local governments until 1986. General revenue sharing gave state and local officials more say over how to spend federal funds than grants that restricted spending to a specific program.

== Reagan Administration ==
Under President Reagan, the Omnibus Budget Reconciliation Act of 1981 consolidated 67 categorical grants into nine new or revised block grants. A contemporary General Accounting Office assessment found that the changes increased state discretion over program decisions, although earmarking requirements and restrictions on eligible activities continued to limit that discretion. Under block grants, states could choose amongst activities within a designated policy area, such as community development, while general revenue sharing gave recipients wider discretion over what to fund.

In 1982, President Reagan proposed transferring full responsibility for funding Aid to Families with Dependent Children and food stamps to the states in exchange for federal assumption of state Medicaid contributions. The proposal, however, did not receive congressional approval. In evaluating New Federalism proposals, the General Accounting Office emphasized both the benefits of responding to local conditions and the potential advantages of national standards and economies of scale. The National Governors Association supported shifting Medicaid costs to the federal government, but opposed having states take on the costs of both assistance programs.

It is one of the happy incidents of the federal system that a single courageous state may, if its citizens choose, serve as a laboratory; and try novel social and economic experiments without risk to the rest of the country.

== On the Supreme Court ==
From 1937 to 1995, the Supreme Court of the United States did not void a single Act of Congress for exceeding Congress's power under the Commerce Clause of the United States Constitution, instead holding that anything that could conceivably impact interstate commerce was subject to federal regulation. It was thus seen as a (narrow) victory for new federalism when the Rehnquist Court reined in federal regulatory power in United States v. Lopez (1995) and United States v. Morrison (2000) by limiting Congress’s power to legislate under the Commerce Clause. In United States v. Lopez, the Supreme Court struck down a federal provision prohibiting firearm possession in school zones. The Court held that the provision exceeded Congress's commerce power because it regulated non-economic conduct without mandating a connection to interstate commerce. In United States v. Morrison, the Court struck down the provision of the Violence Against Women Act that allowed victims of gender-motivated violence to sue their attackers in federal court.

The Supreme Court, in Gonzales v. Raich (2005), held that the federal government could outlaw the use of marijuana for medical purposes under the Commerce Clause even if the marijuana was never bought or sold, and never crossed state lines. Justice O'Connor dissented in Gonzalez, beginning her opinion by citing United States v. Lopez, which she followed with a federalist reference to Justice Louis Brandeis's dissenting opinion in New State Ice Co. v. Liebmann.

== Education ==
Education has been controversial under New Federalism, but for different reasons. Almost all groups, state and federal, agree that a controlled education system is absolutely critical. The division, however, is that some believe that the education system should be nationally united (and therefore controlled by the federal government), while opponents believe that education should vary by state (and therefore be controlled by the state governments).

Some New Federalists, such as President Ronald Reagan, have flirted with the idea of abolishing the Department of Education, but the effort has been unsuccessful. During the Presidency of George W. Bush, the President and Congress cooperated to pass the No Child Left Behind (NCLB) legislation, which required states to meet federal testing standards. Utah was the first state to reject NCLB, and the Attorney General of Connecticut sued the federal government for underfunding NCLB.

In April 2017, President Donald Trump used an executive order to lessen federal influence over education.

== Related legislation ==
- 1971: Legacy of parks
- 1972: State and Local Fiscal Assistance Act PL 92-512
- 1995: Unfunded Mandates Reform Act of 1995 PL 104-4
- 1996: Personal Responsibility and Work Opportunity Act PL 104-193

== See also ==
- Anti-Federalism
- Classical republicanism
- Compact theory
- Convention to propose amendments to the United States Constitution
- Cooperative federalism
- Decentralization
- Federalism
- Federalism in the United States
- Fiscal federalism
- Interposition
- Nullification (U.S. Constitution)
- Paleoconservatism
- Old Right (United States)
- Quango
- States' rights
- Southern Strategy
- Tenth Amendment to the United States Constitution
- Tenther movement

== General and cited references ==
- Gerston, Larry N. (2007). American Federalism: A Concise Introduction. Routledge. ISBN 978-0765616715.
- Katz, Bruce (August 11, 2014). "Nixon's New Federalism 45 Years Later". Brookings Institution.
- O'Connor, Karen; Sabato, Larry J. (2008). American Government: Continuity and Changes. New York: Pearson Longman. ISBN 978-0321097125.
