= Dual federalism =

Political arrangement

Dual federalism, also known as layer-cake federalism or divided sovereignty, is a political arrangement in which power is divided between the federal and state governments in clearly defined terms, with state governments exercising those powers accorded to them without interference from the federal government. Dual federalism is defined in contrast to cooperative federalism ("marble-cake federalism"), in which federal and state governments collaborate on policy.

== United States ==
=== Constitutional origin ===
The system of dual/joint federalism in the United States is a product of the backlash against the Articles of Confederation, ratified in 1781, which established a very weak federal government with the powers to declare war, make treaties, and maintain an army. Fueled by Shays' Rebellion and an economy faltering under the inability of the federal government to pay the debt from the American Revolution, a group later known as the Federalists generated support for a strong central government and called for a Constitutional Convention in 1787 to reconsider the Articles.

In 1787, the Convention almost immediately dropped its original purpose of editing the Articles and instead drafted a new Constitution of the United States. Rejecting both confederal and unitary systems, they based the new American government on a new theory of federalism, a system of shared sovereignty that delegates some powers to the federal government and reserves other powers for the states.

Among other powers, the federal legislature could now tax citizens and maintain a standing military, and had exclusive power over regulating interstate commerce and coining currency. In addition, while Article Six of the Constitution stipulated that federal law in pursuit of constitutionally assigned ends overrode any contradictory state law, the power of the national government was held in check by the Bill of Rights – particularly the Tenth Amendment, which limited federal governmental powers to only those specified in the Constitution.

Importantly, at the Convention, there was large debate over the structure of the legislative branch, eventually solved by the Connecticut Compromise. In the traditional understanding of the discussion, the larger states proposed the Virginia Plan, which allocated representation to each state proportional to its population. The smaller states, fearing a tyranny of the larger states, propose the New Jersey Plan, which gave each state equal representation in the legislative body. The states' motives for such a debate have been largely understood as a method for ensuring a strong voice in the federal government so as to maintain a desired degree of sovereignty. Further, political scientist Martin Diamond interprets the argument through a Federalist vs Anti-Federalist lens, discounting the question of state size. Specifically, he argues that the pure federalism of the New Jersey Plan and the pure nationalism of the Virginia Plan eventually came together to form the system of bicameralism that the framers settled on. However, his theory largely goes against the usual understanding, which some have argued is based on stronger historical evidence.

==== Powers ====
- Exclusive powers of United States Federal Government
  - Lay and collect taxes, duties, imposts and excises
  - To pay the debts
  - Provide for the common defense and general welfare of the United States
  - Borrow money
  - Regulate interstate and international commerce
  - Establish immigration and naturalization law
  - Regulate bankruptcies
  - To coin money
  - Establish weights and measures
  - Prosecute counterfeiting
  - Establish a post office and post roads
  - Regulate patents, copyrights, and trademarks
  - Establish inferior courts
  - Regulate cases in admiralty and offences against the laws of nations
  - Declare war
  - Grant letters of marque and reprisal
  - Regulate the capture of prisoners of war
  - Raise an army
  - Maintain a navy
  - Make rules regulating the military
  - Provide for calling forth, regulating, and disciplining the militia
  - Plenary authority over the capital district
  - Regulating the manner of establishing full faith and credit between states
  - Admittance of new states
  - Plenary authority over all territories
- Exclusive powers of state and local governments
  - Regulation of intrastate commerce
  - Conduct elections
  - Ratification of amendments to the U.S. Constitution
  - To exercise powers neither delegated to the national government nor prohibited from the states by the Constitution as per Amendment X
  - Property laws
  - Inheritance laws
  - Commercial laws
  - Banking laws
  - Corporate laws
  - Insurance
  - Family law
  - Morality law
  - Public health
  - Education
  - Land management
  - Criminal Law
  - Elections
  - Local government
  - Licensing
  - Create its own Constitution

=== 19th-century Supreme Court cases ===
Since the initial division of state and federal powers – collectively, the system of dual federalism – put forth by the Constitution, several seminal court cases have helped further clarify the purview of the federal government. One such case, McCulloch v. Maryland, concerned the constitutionality of a federally chartered bank, which bankers and many legislators in Maryland opposed. Although the ability to charter a bank had not been explicitly granted to the federal government in the Constitution, federalist proponents argued such action as necessary for the federal government to exercise its constitutional power to “tax, borrow, and regulate interstate commerce.” The Supreme Court, in essence, backed Alexander Hamilton's interpretation of the Constitution over Thomas Jefferson. Thus, the bank's legitimacy was ensured by the Necessary and Proper Clause.

A second major case regarding the respective rights of the state and federal government was Gibbons v. Ogden (1824). In 1808, the Fulton-Livingston Company had been granted exclusive steamboat rights by the New York legislature, who in turn had leased ferry rights within a portion of New York to Aaron Ogden. Ogden, citing the monopoly granted to him by the Fulton-Livingstone Company, had successfully prevented Thomas Gibbons from operating a ferry service between Manhattan and New Jersey. Chief Justice Marshall’s majority opinion sided with Gibbons, stating that Ogden's monopoly of the ferry service overstepped states’ ability to regulate trade. While the constitutionality of some aspects implied by the case remained vague, the decision once more reaffirmed the supremacy of federal law and diminished the power of state-sanctioned protectionism.

=== State challenges to federal supremacy ===
In the decades before the Civil War, both Northern and Southern states clashed with the national government over perceived overreaches in its power. These conflicts struck at the heart of dual federalism, and reflected a fundamental disagreement about the division of power between the national and state levels. While these political battles were ostensibly solved either through legislative compromise or Supreme Court decisions, the underlying tensions and disagreements about states’ rights would later help set the stage for the Civil War.

==== South Carolina's nullification doctrine ====
In 1828, the so-called "Tariff of Abominations" passed the U.S. House. It was meant as a protectionist measure to help the relatively industrialized New England states against international products, but this had grave implications for the largely agrarian South. In protest and spearheaded by Vice President John Calhoun, South Carolina formulated a "nullification doctrine", in effect claiming a state's ability to ignore federal law, and rejected the tariff. The situation became especially serious when President Jackson ordered federal troops into Charleston, though crisis was averted by the drafting of a new tariff to which both sides agreed. The crisis illustrated an example of conflicting ideologies on state and federal power that was not resolved through the courts, but with discussion between elected officials.

==== Prigg v. Pennsylvania ====
While some Southern states resisted economic actions of the federal government, several Northern states balked at federal requirements regarding slavery. In 1842, the case of Prigg v. Pennsylvania concerned Edward Prigg, who had been found guilty of kidnapping a former slave residing in Pennsylvania, Margaret Morgan, and her children and bringing them to her former owner in Maryland. Prigg was charged according to Pennsylvania law, which considered such an action a felony, while Prigg argued that he had been duly appointed for the task and was within the bounds of the federal Fugitive Slave Act of 1793. The U.S. Supreme Court declared the Pennsylvania law unconstitutional, striking the abolitionist law and heightening tensions between slaveholding and non-slaveholding states.

==== Nullification by Wisconsin ====
A similar situation arose when, in 1854, the state Supreme Court of Wisconsin declared the Fugitive Slave Act of 1850 unconstitutional. The U.S. Supreme Court overturned the Wisconsin Supreme Court while the Wisconsin legislature, echoing the rhetoric of South Carolina during the 1828 crisis, nullified the U.S. Supreme Court’s decision.

==== Dred Scott v. Sandford (1857) ====
In 1857, continuing the debate between the national government and free states, the case of Dred Scott v. Sandford held that all Americans of African descent were not legally citizens, and therefore could not file suit. Thus Mr. Scott, a slave who had been brought to the free state of Illinois but later returned to slave-holding jurisdictions, and who had pursued emancipation through the federal courts, remained a slave. Though the decision was largely welcomed in the South, the decision outraged abolitionists and non-slaveholding states as another affront on states' rights.

=== Federal power during the Civil War ===
The Civil War brought to a head many of the fundamental disagreements concerning the extent of state and federal powers which presidential candidates Lincoln and Douglas had debated between 1858 and 1860. Douglas, an advocate of federal government limited by a strict interpretation of the Constitution, championed the vision of America as “the confederation of the sovereign states". Lincoln, meanwhile, envisioned a more active federal government and more integrated national community, with the purview of states limited to only "those things that pertain exclusively to themselves—that are local in their nature, that have no connection with the general government". Many of these questions would be resolved by actions taken by the North’s federal government during the course of the fighting during the years after the debates. Actions taken by the North during the war, including the conscription of soldiers into a national army, as provided by the Enrollment Act of March 1863, and expanded federal control over banking with the 1863 National Banking Act, resulting in a much more robust national government in postbellum America. There exists debate over whether this increase in federal power was achieved against states’ will or whether such expanded powers were granted by the states.

After the Civil War, the federal government began expanding its powers, primarily concerning itself with regulating commerce and civil rights, originally considered the domain of state governments.

=== Reconstruction ===
After the Civil War, Congress amended the Constitution to guarantee certain rights for citizens. This period brought about debate on whether the federal government could make these amendments, some arguing that this was an infringement on states' rights. However, during this time period the public began to believe that the federal government was responsible for defending civil liberties even though previously the idea was that a strong central government would be the biggest detriment to personal freedom. Regardless, the Supreme Court verified states' rights to require literacy tests in Williams v. Mississippi, effectively allowing states to discriminate against black voters. In addition, the Court ruled in favor of states' rights to mandate racially segregated accommodations, so long as they were "separate but equal" in Plessy v. Ferguson.

Although law professor Eugene Gressman views these rulings as a "judicially directed perversion" of what the abolitionists meant to accomplish, within historical context the Supreme Court decisions seem more occupied with sustaining the system of dual federalism. In making these decisions, the Supreme Court aimed to keep in line with the idea of federalism as it then existed, balancing states' rights with the protection of civil liberties, rather than simply opposing the new amendments. For instance, in Strauder v. West Virginia the Court sided with those who wished to overturn the law that excluded black citizens from juries, which suggests that the Court was beginning to build a set of cases that enumerated rights based on the new amendments.

However, in other aspects the Supreme Court reasserted states' rights in relation to the 14th Amendment in particular. In the Slaughter-house cases and Bradwell v. Illinois the Court supported the view that the amendment regulated states rather than individuals practicing discrimination. Both of these cases allowed states to enforce laws that infringed on individual rights.

=== End of dual federalism ===
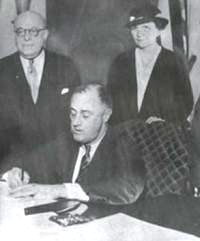
Franklin D. Roosevelt's New Deal policies signaled the end of dual federalism.

The general consensus among scholars is that dual federalism ended during Franklin Roosevelt's presidency in 1937 when the New Deal policies were decided constitutional by the Supreme Court. Industrialization, economic modernization, and conditions surrounding the Great Depression elevated commerce to a more national level, so there was an overlap in the powers of the federal government and the states. The federal government, using the Commerce Clause, passed national policies to regulate the economy. The Interstate Commerce Act and Sherman Antitrust Act solidified Congress's authority to regulate commerce between states and expanded its role.

This, in addition to the New Deal policies, led to the federal government and the states working together more, ending the era of dual federalism and moving America into cooperative federalism. However, political scientists have argued different theories concerning the end of dual federalism. As opposed to a clear transition from dual federalism to cooperative federalism, some political scientists say there was a much more complicated relationship between the states and the federal government. Rather than a competition for power, the powers of the state and federal government change according to national political movements and their agendas; a dynamic that existed both before and after the New Deal.

Other political scientists see dual federalism ending much earlier than the New Deal; This would have been the beginning of cooperative federalism as the federal government identified a problem, set up the basic outline of the program to address the problem, and make money available to fund that program, and then turning over much of the responsibility for implementing and running the program to the states and localities. Daniel Elazar argues that there was substantial cooperation among the states and federal government beginning in the 19th century, leading up to the Civil War and several political scientists assert that starting from the 1870s and throughout the Progressive Era, the federal government and states worked together to create national policies.

== Outside the United States ==
The governments of Argentina, Austria, Australia, Belgium, Bosnia and Herzegovina, Brazil, Canada, Comoros, Ethiopia, Germany, India, Malaysia, Mexico, Micronesia, Nepal, Nigeria, Pakistan, Russia, Saint Kitts and Nevis, Spain, Switzerland, United Arab Emirates, and Venezuela also operate through federalism. The federations of Australia, Canada, and Switzerland most closely resemble the model of American dual federalism in which fundamental governmental powers are divided between the federal and state governments, with the states exercising broad powers.

While the American federalist system allocates both legislative and administrative powers to each division of government, European federations have historically allocated legislative powers to the federal government and left constituents to administer and implement these laws. Most western federalist systems in recent years have drifted away from autonomous levels of governments with strong state powers and moved toward more centralized federal governments, as seen in the American government's transition from dual to cooperative federalism. The Canadian and Australian federal systems closely resemble the American construct of dual federalism in that their legislative and executive powers are allocated in the same policy area to a single level of government. In contrast, some federal structures, such as those of Germany, Austria, and Switzerland, consist of federal governments exercising broad legislative powers and constituent governments allocated the power to administer such legislation in a style similar to cooperative federalism.

Constitutions with delegations of broad powers to the state level of government that resemble the Constitution of the United States include the Constitution of Australia and the Constitution of Canada. The Australian Constitution was designed to enumerate a limited range of federal powers and leave the rest to the states. The Canadian Constitution, in contrast, assigned all residual powers to the federal government and enumerated a complete list of provincial powers. The Austrian Constitution, Constitution of Germany, and Swiss Constitution enumerate few policy fields exclusive to the states, but enumerate extensive concurrent powers. The federations operate chiefly through legislation produced by the federal government and left to the Länder or state governments to implement. Since 1991, Russia may also be considered a dual federation.

== Origins of "layer cake" metaphor ==
In his second term, President Dwight D. Eisenhower organized the Commission on National Goals to broadly outline national objectives. Included in their 1960 report Goals for Americans: The Report of the President's Commission on National Goals was "The Federal System", a report by political scientist Morton Grodzins. In this report, Grodzins first coined the terms "layer cake federalism" and "marble cake federalism." He used the metaphor of a layer cake to describe the system of dual federalism, the separated layers of the cake symbolizing how distinct spheres of power that the state and federal governments have not been inhabited. He contrasted this with marble cake, which he saw as descriptive of federalism's status in 1960, the swirling indistinct boundaries of the cake symbolizing the overlapping and concurrent duties of the state and federal governments.

== See also ==
- Federalism
- Federalism in the United States
- Anti-Federalism
- Cooperative federalism
