= State legislation in protest of federal law in the United States =

State laws passed to dispute federal laws

Several US States have introduced various resolutions and legislation in protest to federal actions. Despite this, the Supreme Court has explicitly rejected the idea that the states can nullify federal law. In Cooper v. Aaron (1958), the Supreme Court of the United States held that federal law prevails over state law due to the operation of the Supremacy Clause, and that federal law "can neither be nullified openly and directly by state legislators or state executive or judicial officers nor nullified indirectly by them through evasive schemes ..." Thus, state laws purporting to nullify federal statutes or to exempt states and their citizens from federal statutes have only symbolic impact.

== State sovereignty resolutions (10th Amendment resolutions) ==
These resolutions attempt to reassert state sovereignty over any area not listed among the "enumerated powers" (i.e., any law based on an "expansive reading" of the Commerce Clause, the Necessary and Proper Clause, or the Supremacy Clause would, according to this resolution, be invalid).

- During 2009, "state sovereignty resolutions" or "10th Amendment Resolutions" were introduced in the legislatures of 37 states; in seven states the resolutions passed (Alaska, Idaho, North Dakota, South Dakota, Oklahoma, Louisiana, and Tennessee).
- During 2010, resolutions were introduced or reintroduced into the legislatures of 21 states; the resolution passed in seven states (Alabama, Arizona, Kansas, Nebraska, South Carolina, Utah, and Wyoming).
- A state sovereignty resolution was prefiled for the 2011 session of the Texas Legislature (a prior 2009 resolution did not pass).

== State sovereignty bills (10th Amendment Bills) ==
A "State Sovereignty Bill" is one step beyond a State Sovereignty Resolution. The bill would mandate action against what the state legislature perceives as unconstitutional federal legislation.

- During 2010, such legislation was introduced in six states (Florida, Georgia, Michigan, Missouri, New Hampshire, and Oklahoma); however, none made it past the introductory stage.

== Firearms freedom legislation and federal gun laws nullification ==
Starting in 2012, in response to a threat of law made through executive orders by President Obama, more than a dozen states around the US began proposing legislation that would "...declare that any firearms made and retained in-state are beyond the authority of Congress under its constitutional power to regulate commerce among the states". The legislation would require that the firearm be prominently marked as being "Made in {name of state}" and further prohibit federal regulation solely on the basis that "basic materials" and "generic and insignificant parts" of the firearm may have their origins from outside the state.

- Through 2010, resolutions have been introduced in the legislatures of 27 states that would nullify federal authority over such local firearms. The legislation passed in Montana and Tennessee in 2009 and in Alaska, Arizona, Idaho, South Dakota, Utah, and Wyoming the following year. South Carolina has taken the issue one step further: in 2010 a bill was introduced which would effectively nullify all gun registration laws within the state.
- Texas has prefiled and West Virginia has filed similar legislation for the current 2011 legislative session.
- In 2013, one of the most strongly worded Second Amendment protection acts in the nation was signed into law in Kansas.

== Cannabis laws ==
As of December 2023, 14 states (Alabama, Arkansas, Florida, Hawaii, Kentucky, Louisiana, Mississippi, New Hampshire, North Dakota, Oklahoma, Pennsylvania, South Dakota, Utah, and West Virginia) have passed legislation which permit the use of cannabis for medical purposes only.

24 states (Alaska, Arizona, California, Colorado, Connecticut, Delaware, Illinois, Maine, Maryland, Massachusetts, Michigan, Minnesota, Missouri, Montana, Nevada, New Jersey, New Mexico, New York, Ohio, Oregon, Rhode Island, Vermont, Virginia, Washington) & Washington, D.C. have passed legislation to permit use of recreational cannabis in addition to medical use.

The Obama administration announced in October 2009 that it advised federal prosecutors not to target legally-operating medicinal cannabis users, or their suppliers, in states that have passed such laws. However, in the same year, the DEA conducted a record number of medical cannabis raids.

The DEA has continued to raid federally prohibited medical facilities in several states.

The IRS has also attempted to prevent the sale of medical cannabis in California by refusing to treat normally-deductible business expenses as such for dispensaries, notably for the Harborside Health Center in Oakland.

== REAL ID Act ==
As of March 2010, 25 states (beginning with Maine in 2007) have passed legislation and/or resolutions which opposed the REAL ID Act. Though the legislation is still on the books, its implementation has been delayed on several occasions and is currently not being enforced.

== National health care nullification ==
As of March 2010, legislators in 30 states had introduced legislation which would declare certain provisions of any proposed national health care bill to be null and void within the state; the legislation passed in Arizona, Idaho, Utah, and Virginia. Such provisions include mandatory participation in such a system as well as preserving the right of a patient to pay a health care professional for treatment (and for the professional to accept it) outside of a single-payer system. Arizona's legislation passed as a proposed constitutional amendment, approved by voters in 2010. On February 1, 2010, the Virginia Senate took a stand against a key provision of a proposed federal health care overhaul, passing legislation declaring that Virginia residents cannot be forced to buy health insurance. On March 17, 2010, Idaho Governor C.L. "Butch" Otter signed a bill requiring the Attorney General to sue the federal government if Idaho residents are required to buy health insurance.

== Bring the Guard home ==
As of March 2010, legislators in seven states had introduced legislation which would permit the governor of the state to recall any National Guard troops from overseas deployments (such as in Iraq and Afghanistan); the bills failed in Maryland and New Mexico.

== Legal tender ==
As of March 2010, legislators in seven states have introduced legislation which would seek to nullify federal legal tender laws in the state by authorizing payment in gold and silver or a paper note backed 100% by gold or silver; the legislation failed in Colorado and Montana.

== Cap-and-trade nullification ==
As of March 2010, legislators in four states have introduced legislation which would nullify any proposed federal emissions regulation under the "cap-and-trade" model; none have advanced beyond the introductory stage.

== State sovereignty and federal tax funds acts ==
As of March 2010, legislators in three states have introduced legislation which would require businesses (and in some cases, individuals) to remit their federal tax payments to the state treasurer (or equivalent body) for deposit into an escrow fund. If the state legislature determined that a portion of the federal budget was not constitutional, or if the federal government imposed penalties or sanctions upon the state for creating the fund, then the money would be withheld. None have advanced beyond the introductory stage.

== Sheriffs first legislation ==
As of March 2010, legislators in three states had introduced legislation which would make it a crime for any federal agent to make an arrest, search or seizure within the state without getting the advance, written permission of the sheriff of the county in which the event would take place. The bills would provide for the following exceptions:

- Actions on federal property
- A federal employee witnesses a crime requiring an immediate arrest
- Actions under either hot pursuit or involving immigration
- The person to be apprehended is either an elected county or state officer, an employee of the sheriff's office, or has such close connection with the sheriff that the person is likely to be notified by the sheriff of any impending action.

None have advanced beyond the introductory stage.

== Federal land legislation ==
As of February 2010, legislators in Utah have introduced legislation to allow the use of eminent domain on federal land. Rep. Christopher Herrod has introduced the bill in a state where the federal government controls over 60% of the land. The effort has the full support of Republican Attorney General Mark Shurtleff, who would have to defend the law. The proposal includes setting aside $3 million for legal defense.

== Nullification of federal intrastate commerce regulation ==
As of March 2010, legislators in four states had introduced legislation which would nullify federal regulation of trade and activities which are solely within the boundaries of a state and which do not cross state lines; that is activities that are by its definition not commerce, under the Constitution. The Virginia legislation has passed one house.

== Sanctuary city ==
Another form of protest against enforcement of immigration laws, several United States cities have declared themselves sanctuary cities, whereby they have ordered the local police department to specifically not work with United States Customs and Border Protection officials to arrest persons illegally residing within the boundaries of the city, and not to inquire as to a person's immigration status, even if the person was arrested.

== Intrastate Coal and Use Act ==
In protest of the Environmental Protection Agency allegedly overstepping its authority by interfering with intrastate commerce, the West Virginia Intrastate Coal and Use Act (H.B. 2554) was being introduced into the West Virginia House of Delegates by Delegate Gary Howell. The bill states that coal sold and used within the borders of West Virginia is not subject to EPA authority because no interstate commerce exists and the state retains the rights to control its own intrastate commerce under the 10th Amendment. The American Legislative Exchange Council (ALEC) recommends the Intrastate Coal and Use Act for model legislation in other states.

== See also ==
- Tenth Amendment to the United States Constitution
- Tenther movement
