= Commandeering =

Military or police taking control of private property

Commandeering is an act of appropriation by the military or police whereby they take possession of the property of a member of the public.

== In the United Kingdom ==
In the United Kingdom, there is no law that authorises police to commandeer vehicles; however, they may ask drivers to help them when pursuing suspects or responding to urgent calls if no suitable vehicles are available. A parliamentary debate on 31 May 1934 mentions that the Metropolitan Police Service engaged in this practice some 35 times over the preceding year, and reimbursed drivers for repair costs in 3 cases where private vehicles sustained damage while under police use.

== In Canada ==
In Canada, members of the public are required to assist police officers according to the Criminal Code of Canada, section 129. In 2019, Victoria police invoked this principle to commandeer private watercraft to assist in rescuing a person stuck on a sinking boat.

== In the United States ==
In United States law, commandeering also refers to federal government actions which would force a state government to take some action that it otherwise would not take. The US Supreme Court has held that commandeering violates principles designed to prevent either the state or federal governments from becoming too powerful. Writing for the majority in 1997 for Printz v. United States, Justice Antonin Scalia said, "[t]he Federal Government may neither issue directives requiring the States to address particular problems, nor command the States' officers, or those of their political subdivisions, to administer or enforce a federal regulatory program." States derive their protection from commandeering from the Tenth Amendment.

=== Distinction from preemption ===
The Congress may enact federal law that supersedes or preempts state law. The distinction between commandeering and preemption was at issue in Murphy v. NCAA, a case involving sports betting.

In the case of marijuana legalization, federal law preempts laws in those states that have authorized its use. The federal government has chosen not to enforce provisions of federal law that apply to otherwise law-abiding adult use in those states. If the Department of Justice were to challenge these state laws, a likely legal objection would be that this is commandeering. Challenges to state-level marijuana legalizations in federal court have been unsuccessful for this reason.

== See also ==
- Posse comitatus – A group of people gathered to assist police
