= Cooperative federalism =

Flexible government where state and national level cooperate

Cooperative federalism, also known as marble-cake federalism, is defined as a flexible relationship between the federal and state governments in which both work together on a variety of issues and programs.

== In the United States ==
In the American federal system, there are limitations on national government's ability to carry out its policies through the executive branch of state governments. For example, in Printz v. United States, 521 U.S. 898 (1997) the Court held that the national government could not directly require state law enforcement officers to conduct background checks under the Brady Handgun Violence Prevention Act legislation. The court explained that prior decisions warned that "this Court never has sanctioned explicitly a federal command to the States to promulgate and enforce laws and regulations." And yet, there are significant advantages in a federal system to obtain state assistance in the local implementation of federal programs. Implementing such programs through national employees would significantly increase the size and intrusiveness of the national government. Moreover, local implementation may assure that these programs are implemented in ways that take local conditions into account.

For this reason, Congress has often avoided adoption of completely nationalized programs by one of two devices. In the first, Congress creates a delivery system for federal programs in which the national government encourages local implementation of a federal program by providing significant matching funds. In this context, the phrase may be found in a number of Supreme Court and lower court federal cases. The most frequent early use of the phrase may be found in a series of cases describing the paradigm for federally sponsored welfare programs such as medical assistance or the former Aid to Families with Dependent Children (AFDC) programs in which a participating state's program is financed largely by the Federal Government, on a matching fund basis, subject to federal mandatory regulations. See for example, King v. Smith and a series of subsequent AFDC cases. More recently, the phrase has been used in connection with other federal programs built on the cooperative federalism model. See California v. U.S. 438 U.S. 645 (1978) (Reclamation Act) and Schaffer v. Weist (Special education). Here, the motivation for State compliance is that absent state compliance with federal conditions, the state loses significant federal funding.

The second method of encouraging states to implement federal programs is described in New York v. United States, 505 U.S. 144 (1992). In this form, the Congress states that it will take over the regulation of an activity at the national level, unless the State itself implements its own program of regulation meeting minimum federal standards. Here, the motivation for State compliance is that absent state regulation, the state loses power over the regulated area entirely. In New York v. United States, the court explained:

"... where Congress has the authority to regulate private activity under the Commerce Clause, we have recognized Congress' power to offer States the choice of regulating that activity according to federal standards or having state law preempted by federal regulation. Hodel v. Virginia Surface Mining & Reclamation Association. See also FERC v. Mississippi. This arrangement, which has been termed 'a program of cooperative federalism,' Hodel, supra, is replicated in numerous federal statutory schemes. These include the Clean Water Act, see Arkansas v. Oklahoma, (Clean Water Act 'anticipates a partnership between the States and the Federal Government, animated by a shared objective'); the Occupational Safety and Health Act of 1970, see Gade v. National Solid Wastes Management Assn., the Resource Conservation and Recovery Act of 1976, see Department of Energy v. Ohio, and the Alaska National Interest Lands Conservation Act, see Kenaitze Indian Tribe v. Alaska."

While the federal system places limits on the ability of the national government to require implementation by a State executive branch, or its local political subdivisions, that limitation does not apply in the same way to State judicial systems. In part, this is because the founders understood that state courts would be courts of general jurisdiction, bound to apply both state and federal law. In part, it is because the State courts adjudicate cases between citizens who are bound to comply with both state and federal law. When the Congress seeks to establish federal legislation which governs the behavior of citizens, the Congress is free to choose among three judicial enforcement paradigms. It may open both federal or state courts to enforcement of that right, by specifically providing concurrent jurisdiction in the federal courts. It may grant exclusive jurisdiction to the federal courts, or it may choose to leave enforcement of that right to civil dispute resolution amongst parties in State court.

=== Criminal law ===
The wide-scale use of cooperative federalism is present also in the implementation of federal law criminalizing drug and gun possession. The federal government lacks a police force that can enforce these kinds of crimes; it must rely on state and local police forces. As a result, the federal government has enacted programs such as Project Safe Neighborhoods that encourage cooperation between state and local police forces/district attorneys and federal prosecutors. This kind of cooperation can have problematic effects. As William Partlett writes:

"... cooperative federalism presents new—and largely unexplored—constitutional problems. In particular, unlike the civil regulatory context, cooperation threatens the constitutional rights of individual criminal defendants by allowing executives to circumvent local juries, judges, and laws. Moreover, this cooperation also potentially weakens the ability of states and cities to function as political entities that can hold their law enforcement officers accountable in an area of traditional state police power ..."

== See also ==
- Federalism
- Federalism in the United States
- Dual federalism
- Corporative federalism
- Subsidiarity
