= Tenth Amendment to the United States Constitution =

1791 amendment enumerating states' rights

The Tenth Amendment (Amendment X) to the United States Constitution, a part of the Bill of Rights, was ratified on December 15, 1791. It expresses the principle of federalism, whereby the federal government and the individual states share power, by mutual agreement. The Tenth Amendment prescribes that the federal government has only those powers delegated to it by the Constitution, and that all other powers not forbidden to the states by the Constitution are reserved to each state, or to the people.

The amendment, with origins before the American Revolution, was proposed by the 1st United States Congress in 1789 during its first term following the adoption of the Constitution. It was considered by many members as a prerequisite before they would ratify the Constitution, and particularly to satisfy demands of Anti-Federalists, who opposed the creation of a stronger federal government.

The purpose of this amendment is to reaffirm the principles of federalism and reinforce the notion of the federal government maintaining only limited, enumerated powers. Some legal scholars (including textualists and originalists) have effectively classified the amendment as a tautology, a statement affirming that the federal government does not have any rights that it does not have.

== Text ==
The powers not delegated to the United States by the Constitution, nor prohibited by it to the States, are reserved to the States respectively, or to the people.

The hand-written copy of the proposed Bill of Rights, 1789, cropped to show only the text that would later be ratified as the Tenth Amendment

== Drafting and adoption ==
The Bill of Rights in the National Archives

The Tenth Amendment is similar to Article II of the Articles of Confederation:

Each state retains its sovereignty, freedom, and independence, and every power, jurisdiction, and right, which is not by this Confederation expressly delegated to the United States, in Congress assembled.

Thomas Burke, a vehement supporter of states' rights in the Continental Congress, originally proposed the text of what would later become the Tenth Amendment as an amendment to the Articles of Confederation. Thomas Burke wanted to ensure that there was no ambiguity concerning differences in state or federal power. Other Founding Fathers of the United States disagreed with this amendment, including James Wilson, John Dickinson (who drafted the Articles of Confederation), and Richard Henry Lee. Nevertheless, the amendment was passed by the Continental Congress.

After the American Revolution, with the completion of the drafting and ratification of the Constitution, South Carolina Representative Thomas Tudor Tucker and Massachusetts Representative Elbridge Gerry separately proposed similar amendments limiting the federal government to powers "expressly" delegated, which would have denied implied powers. James Madison opposed the amendments, stating that "it was impossible to confine a Government to the exercise of express powers; there must necessarily be admitted powers by implication, unless the Constitution descended to recount every minutia." When a vote on this version of the amendment with "expressly delegated" was defeated, Connecticut Representative Roger Sherman drafted the Tenth Amendment in its ratified form, omitting "expressly". Sherman's language allowed for an expansive reading of the powers implied by the Necessary and Proper Clause.

When James Madison introduced the Tenth Amendment in Congress, he explained that many states were eager to ratify this amendment, despite critics who deemed the amendment superfluous or unnecessary:

I find, from looking into the amendments proposed by the State conventions, that several are particularly anxious that it should be declared in the Constitution, that the powers not therein delegated should be reserved to the several States. Perhaps words which may define this more precisely than the whole of the instrument now does, may be considered as superfluous. I admit they may be deemed unnecessary: but there can be no harm in making such a declaration, if gentlemen will allow that the fact is as stated. I am sure I understand it so, and do therefore propose it.

The states ratified the Tenth Amendment, declining to signal that there are unenumerated powers in addition to unenumerated rights. The amendment rendered unambiguous what had previously been at most a mere suggestion or an implication.

== Judicial interpretation ==
The Tenth Amendment, which makes explicit the idea that the powers of the federal government are limited to those powers granted in the Constitution, has been declared to be a truism by the Supreme Court. In United States v. Sprague (1932) the Supreme Court asserted that the amendment "added nothing to the [Constitution] as originally ratified."

States and local governments have occasionally attempted to assert exemption from various federal regulations, especially in the areas of labor and environmental controls, using the Tenth Amendment as a basis for their claim. An often-repeated quote, from United States v. Darby Lumber Co., reads as follows:

The amendment states but a truism that all is retained which has not been surrendered. There is nothing in the history of its adoption to suggest that it was more than declaratory of the relationship between the national and state governments as it had been established by the Constitution before the amendment or that its purpose was other than to allay fears that the new national government might seek to exercise powers not granted, and that the states might not be able to exercise fully their reserved powers.

In Garcia v. San Antonio Metropolitan Transit Authority (1985), the Court overruled National League of Cities v. Usery (1976). Under National League of Cities, the determination of whether there was state immunity from federal regulation turned on whether the state activity was "traditional" for or "integral" to the state government. In Garcia, the Court noted that this analysis was "unsound in principle and unworkable in practice", and concluded that the framers believed state sovereignty could be maintained by the political system established by the Constitution. Noting that the same Congress that extended the Fair Labor Standards Act to cover government-run mass transit systems also provided substantial funding for those systems, the Court concluded that the structure created by the Framers had indeed protected the states from overreaching by the federal government.

In South Carolina v. Baker (1988), the Court said in dicta that an exception to Garcia would be when a state lacked "any right to participate" in the federal political process or was left "politically isolated and powerless" by a federal law.

=== Commandeering ===
Since 1992, the Supreme Court has ruled that the Tenth Amendment prohibits the federal government from forcing states to pass or not pass certain legislation, or to enforce federal law.

In New York v. United States (1992), the Supreme Court invalidated part of the Low-Level Radioactive Waste Policy Amendments Act of 1985. The act provided three incentives for states to comply with statutory obligations to provide for the disposal of low-level radioactive waste. The first two incentives were monetary. The third, which was challenged in this case, obliged states to take title to any waste within their borders that had not been disposed of prior to January 1, 1996, and made each state liable for all damages directly related to such waste. The Court ruled that imposing that obligation on a state violated the Tenth Amendment. Justice Sandra Day O'Connor wrote that the federal government can encourage the states to adopt certain regulations through the spending power (e.g., by attaching conditions to the receipt of federal funds, see South Dakota v. Dole,) or through the commerce power (which allows it directly to preempt state law). However, Congress cannot directly compel states to enforce federal regulations.

In Printz v. United States (1997), the Court ruled that part of the Brady Handgun Violence Prevention Act violated the Tenth Amendment. The act required state and local law enforcement officials to conduct background checks on people attempting to purchase handguns. Justice Antonin Scalia, writing for the majority, applied New York v. United States to conclude that the act violated the Tenth Amendment. Since the act "forced participation of the State's executive in the actual administration of a federal program", it was unconstitutional.

In Murphy v. National Collegiate Athletic Association (2018), the Supreme Court ruled that the Professional and Amateur Sports Protection Act of 1992, which prohibited states that had banned sports betting when the law was enacted from later legalizing it, violated the anti-commandeering doctrine, and invalidated the entire law. The Court ruled that the anti-commandeering doctrine applied to congressional attempts to prevent the states from taking a certain action as much as it applied in New York and Printz to Congress requiring states to enforce federal law.

=== Commerce Clause ===
In the 20th century, the Commerce Clause became one of the most frequently-used sources of Congress's power. Its interpretation is important in determining the allowable scope of federal government. Complex economic challenges arising from the Great Depression triggered a reevaluation in both Congress and the Supreme Court of the use of Commerce Clause powers to maintain a strong national economy.

In Wickard v. Filburn (1942), in the context of World War II, the Court ruled that federal regulation of wheat production could constitutionally be applied to wheat grown for "home consumption" on a farm (i.e., fed to animals or otherwise consumed on the premises). The rationale was that a farmer's growing "his own" can have a substantial cumulative effect on interstate commerce, because if all farmers were to exceed their production quotas, a significant amount of wheat would either not be sold on the market or would be bought from other producers. Hence, in the aggregate, if farmers were allowed to consume their own wheat, it would affect the interstate market.

In United States v. Lopez (1995), a federal law mandating a "gun-free zone" on and around public school campuses was struck down. The Supreme Court ruled that there was no clause in the Constitution authorizing the federal law. This was the first modern Supreme Court opinion to limit the government's power under the Commerce Clause. The opinion did not mention the Tenth Amendment or the Court's 1985 Garcia decision.

Most recently, in Gonzales v. Raich (2005), a California woman sued the Drug Enforcement Administration after her medical cannabis crop was seized and destroyed by federal agents. Medical cannabis was explicitly made legal under California state law by Proposition 215, despite cannabis being prohibited at the federal level by the Controlled Substances Act. Even though the woman grew cannabis strictly for her own consumption and never sold any, the Supreme Court stated that growing one's own cannabis affects the interstate market of cannabis. In theory the product could enter the stream of interstate commerce, even if it clearly had not been grown for that purpose and was unlikely ever to reach any market (the same reasoning as in Wickard v. Filburn). It therefore ruled that this practice may be regulated by the federal government under the Commerce Clause.

=== Supremacy Clause ===
In Cooper v. Aaron (1958), the Supreme Court dealt with states' rights and the Tenth Amendment. The case came about when conflicts arose in direct response to the ruling of another landmark case, Brown v. Board of Education (1954). In Brown, the Supreme Court unanimously declared racial segregation of children in public schools unconstitutional. Following Brown, the court ordered district courts and school boards to proceed with desegregation "with all deliberate speed."

Among those opposing the decision, and all efforts of desegregation, was the governor of Arkansas, Orval Faubus. Although the previously all-white Central High School and its school board attempted to follow the decision of Brown, Faubus intervened to physically block the students, known as the Little Rock Nine. Sending 250 Arkansas National Guard troops to keep the school all-white, the governor received the attention of President Dwight D. Eisenhower, who responded with federal troops to escort the students onto campus.

Five months after the integration crisis happened, the school board filed suit in the federal District Court for the Eastern District of Arkansas requesting a two-and-a-half-year delay in implementing desegregation. Although the district court granted the relief, the Eighth Circuit reversed the decision on August 18, 1958, and stayed its mandate pending appeal to the Supreme Court. By this time, the incident had evolved into national debate about racism and segregation in addition to the question of states' rights and the Tenth Amendment.

The Court cited the Supremacy Clause of Article VI, which declares the Constitution to be the supreme law of the land, and Marbury v. Madison in holding that the states must abide by the Court's decision in Brown. Expectedly, many states' right advocates and state officials criticized the ruling as an attack on the Tenth Amendment. Moreover, they claimed the Court's decision on Cooper as being inconsistent with the constitutional vision of the Framers.

==== Nullification and interposition ====
Nullification refers to a legal theory suggesting that states may evaluate the legality of federal laws and declare them unconstitutional with respect to the US Constitution. The intended effect is to invalidate (nullify) the laws within the state's boundaries. A related notion of interposition refers to a belief that it is a right of a state to thwart enforcement of federal laws that the state considers unconstitutional and as such are harmful to its inhabitants. The state is said to be "interposing" itself between the federal government and the people of the state.

The concept of nullification stems from the so-called compact theory suggesting that because the states created the federal government by agreement ("compact") to join the Union, they alone can determine how much power they delegate to the federal authorities. This is in opposition to the current practice where only federal courts perform judicial review of allegedly offending federal laws. James Madison and Thomas Jefferson drafted the Kentucky and Virginia Resolutions that lay the bedrock for arguments for nullification. In the 19th century, several states relied on this interpretation to declare nullification of federal laws or decisions of the US Supreme Court, but the Supreme Court struck down all such efforts. Among the most famous was the Nullification Crisis, when South Carolina declared the tariffs of 1828 and 1832 void in the state, but it was resolved when tariffs were lowered to South Carolina's satisfaction and when President Andrew Jackson threatened military intervention unless the state relented. The Civil War, however, ended all appeals to state sovereignty and the Supreme Court's authority as the highest interpreter of constitutional law.

The idea of nullification gained new traction in the 1950s as the Supreme Court ordered desegregation of schools in Brown v. Board of Education, and Southern states in response mounted a campaign of massive resistance to oppose it, arguing that federal desegregation orders infringed on states' rights. Ten ex-Confederate states passed declarations of interposition to oppose these efforts. But the Supreme Court in Cooper v. Aaron rejected the declarations and held nullification and interposition impermissible.

Today, laws that appear to circumvent some Supreme Court decisions or federal law may sometimes be called laws of nullification, including in cases if they do not explicitly urge to defy federal law or resist federal authority. Examples of this usage include the Texas Heartbeat Act and the Missouri Second Amendment Preservation Act or immigration and marijuana laws.

=== Federal funding ===
The federal system limits the ability of the federal government to use state governments as an instrument of the national government, as held in Printz v. United States.

For this reason, Congress often seeks to exercise its powers by encouraging States to implement national programs consistent with national minimum standards; a system known as cooperative federalism. One example of the exercise of this device was to condition allocation of federal funding where certain state laws do not conform to federal guidelines. For example, federal educational funds may not be accepted without implementation of special education programs in compliance with IDEA. Similarly, the nationwide 55 mph (89 km/h) speed limit, 0.08 legal blood alcohol limit, and the nationwide state 21-year drinking age were imposed through this method; the states would lose highway funding if they refused to pass such laws (though the national speed limit has since been repealed).

In National Federation of Independent Business v. Sebelius (2012), the Court ruled that the Patient Protection and Affordable Care Act (commonly referred to as the ACA or Obamacare) unconstitutionally coerced the states to expand Medicaid. The Court classified the ACA's language as coercive because it effectively forced States to join the federal program by conditioning the continued provision of Medicaid funds on states agreeing to materially alter Medicaid eligibility to include all individuals who fell below 133% of the poverty line.

== See also ==
- New Federalism
- Principle of conferral
- State legislation in protest of federal law in the United States
- States' rights
- Tenther movement
