= Garcia v. San Antonio Metropolitan Transit Authority =

1985 U.S. Supreme Court case concerning the Fair Labor Standards Act

- Supreme Court of the United States

Argued March 19, 1984 Reargued October 1, 1984 Decided February 19, 1985
- Full case name: Garcia v. San Antonio Metropolitan Transit Authority, et al.
- Citations: 469 U.S. 528 (more) 105 S. Ct. 1005; 83 L. Ed. 2d 1016; 85 U.S. LEXIS 48; 53 U.S.L.W. 4135; 102 Lab. Cas. (CCH) ¶ 34,633; 36 Empl. Prac. Dec. (CCH) ¶ 34,995; 27 Wage & Hour Cas. (BNA) 65

Case history
- Prior: Summary judgment granted to plaintiff San Antonio Metropolitan Transit Authority, 557 F. Supp. 445 (W.D. Tex. 1982); probable jurisdiction noted, 464 U.S. 812 (1983).
- Subsequent: Petition for rehearing denied April 15, 1985

Holding
- Congress had the authority under the Commerce Clause of the United States Constitution to apply the Fair Labor Standards Act to a municipal mass transit system operated by a governmental entity. District Court for the Western District of Texas reversed.

Court membership
- Chief Justice Warren E. Burger Associate Justices William J. Brennan Jr. · Byron White; Thurgood Marshall · Harry Blackmun; Lewis F. Powell Jr. · William Rehnquist; John P. Stevens · Sandra Day O'Connor

Case opinions
- Majority: Blackmun, joined by Brennan, White, Marshall, Stevens
- Dissent: Powell, joined by Burger, Rehnquist, O'Connor
- Dissent: Rehnquist
- Dissent: O'Connor, joined by Rehnquist, Powell

Laws applied
- U.S. Const. amend. XIV, Commerce Clause, Necessary and Proper Clause; Fair Labor Standards Act of 1938
- This case overturned a previous ruling or rulings
- National League of Cities v. Usery, 426 U.S. 833 (1976)

Garcia v. San Antonio Metropolitan Transit Authority, 469 U.S. 528 (1985), is a landmark United States Supreme Court decision in which the Court held that the Congress has the power under the Commerce Clause of the Constitution to extend the Fair Labor Standards Act, which requires that employers provide minimum wage and overtime pay to their employees, to state and local governments. In this case, the Court overruled its previous decision in National League of Cities v. Usery, in which the Court had held that regulation of the activities of state and local governments "in areas of traditional governmental functions" would violate the Tenth Amendment to the United States Constitution.

== History ==
When Congress passed the Fair Labor Standards Act (FLSA) in 1938, it did not apply either to employees of private transit companies or to employees of state and local governments. Congress extended coverage of the FLSA's minimum wage provisions to employees of private transit companies of a certain size in 1961, then amended the Act to cover some employees of state and local governments in 1966 by withdrawing the minimum wage and overtime exemptions for public hospitals, schools, and mass transit carriers whose rates and services were subject to state regulation. At the same time, Congress eliminated the overtime exemption for all mass transit employees other than drivers, operators, and conductors. Congress later phased out these overtime exemptions when amending the Act in 1974.

The Supreme Court held in Maryland v. Wirtz that Congress had the authority under the Commerce Clause to extend the FLSA to cover employees of public schools and hospitals. In 1976, however, the Court held in National League of Cities that Congress lacked authority to regulate the wages and hours of governmental employees performing "traditional governmental functions." The San Antonio Metropolitan Transit Authority (SAMTA, now known as VIA Metropolitan Transit), which had been observing the overtime requirements of federal law up to that point, responded by informing employees that it was no longer obliged to provide them with overtime pay.

In 1979, the Wage and Hour Division of the United States Department of Labor took the position that SAMTA's operations were covered by the FLSA because they were not a traditional governmental function. SAMTA then filed suit in the United States District Court for the Western District of Texas seeking a declaratory judgment that its transit operations were beyond Congress' power to regulate. The Department of Labor filed a counterclaim seeking enforcement of the Act.

Joe G. Garcia and other employees of SAMTA brought their own suit in the same court seeking to recover the overtime pay they claimed they were owed. The court stayed that action but allowed Garcia to intervene as a defendant in the SAMTA declaratory judgment action against the Department of Labor.

== Prior rulings ==
The United States District Court for the Western District of Texas granted SAMTA the declaratory judgment it sought, ruling that its transit operations were a traditional governmental function and therefore exempt from regulation under National League of Cities v. Usery. Both Garcia and the department appealed directly to the Supreme Court, which vacated and remanded the decision for reconsideration in light of its intervening decision in Transportation Union v. Long Island R. Co., that some transit operations were not a traditional function of government.

On remand, the district court again held for SAMTA, ruling that the historical record showed that, even though local mass transit operations had been largely privately owned in the past, they had also been heavily regulated by state and local governments, creating at least an "inference of sovereignty". Noting that the federal government had historically exempted the operations of state and local governments from federal regulation in many instances, it ruled that refusing to apply the FLSA would not run counter to a century of regulation, as was the case in the railroad industry, and that exemption of state and local governments' operations was, in fact, a supervening federal policy. Called on to draw a distinction between those governmental functions that were traditional and those that were not, the Court analogized the task to Justice Potter Stewart's famous definition of pornography in Jacobellis v. Ohio, holding that it was impossible to articulate the distinction but "someone knows it when they see it". Both Garcia and the Department of Labor appealed again.

== Supreme Court ==
=== Argument and reargument ===
The case was argued on March 19, 1984, with William Thaddeus Coleman Jr. appearing to argue for the Transit Authority and Assistant Attorney General Theodore Olson arguing for the workers. At the March 21 conference five Justices, including Justice Harry Blackmun, voted to affirm, upholding National League of Cities.

Justice Blackmun had joined the Court in National League of Cities but wrote in concurrence that he was “not untroubled” by Justice William Rehnquist's majority opinion. Chief Justice Warren E. Burger preferred to assign opinions to the "least persuaded" justice, so now he asked Blackmun to write for the Court. Justice Blackmun's law clerk, however, convinced Blackmun that he could not write a workable opinion upholding National League of Cities. On June 11 Justice Blackmun circulated a memo announcing that he was switching his vote.

The case was scheduled for reargument and the Court asked for briefs on the additional question as to if National League of Cities “should be reconsidered”. At reargument on October 1 former Secretary Coleman reappeared for the Transit Authority but this time the Solicitor General of the United States Rex E. Lee appeared, arguing to reverse. Half of the States filed amici briefs urging affirmance, including then-Attorneys General Joe Lieberman and John Ashcroft.

In its decision, issued February 19, 1985, the Court ruled by a vote of five to four that the concept of "traditional governmental functions" was analytically unsound and that Congress had the power under the Commerce Clause to apply the FLSA to employees of state and local governments.

=== Opinion of the Court ===
Writing for the majority, Justice Blackmun noted that the courts had not come up with an analytically sound distinction between traditional and non-traditional governmental operations. He noted that the Supreme Court had decades earlier adopted a similar distinction in challenges to the federal government's taxation of the operations of state governments, only to eventually reject it as well. He therefore found the standard fundamentally unworkable. The court then rejected any efforts to draw this distinction, whether based on the historical record or on historical grounds, as arbitrary and likely to be suffused with the prejudices of an unelected branch of government as to which governmental functions are proper and traditional and which ones are not.

The court also rejected the theoretical underpinning of the decision in National League of Cities v. Usery that the Constitution's recognition of the sovereignty of the states necessarily implies limits on the power of the federal government to regulate their employment relations. In the majority's view, the constitutional grant of authority to Congress to regulate interstate commerce was not qualified by any implied limitation on the right to regulate the activities of the states when they engaged in interstate commerce; on the contrary, the Commerce Clause invalidates state regulations that interfere with commerce, while the Supremacy Clause allows Congress to preempt state laws that conflict with federal law in this area. According to the majority, the framers believed that state sovereignty could be maintained by the peculiar structure they adopted: a Senate in which each state was given equal representation, regardless of its population, an electoral college that gave the states the power to choose electors, and the indirect election of Senators by the legislature of each state prior to the adoption of the Seventeenth Amendment to the United States Constitution. Noting that the same Congress that extended the FLSA to cover government-run mass transit systems also provided substantial funding for those systems, the court concluded that the structure created by the framers had indeed protected the states from overreaching by the federal government.

=== Powell's dissent ===
Justice Powell, joined by Chief Justice Burger, Justice Rehnquist and Justice O'Connor, objected to both the court's failure to make use of stare decisis with respect to its decision in National League of Cities and for reducing the balancing test that the Court adopted in National League of Cities. Powell was even more critical of the majority's claimed failure to recognize any limiting role of the Tenth Amendment to the United States Constitution, accusing it of negating the court's role in mediating between federal and state through judicial review of the constitutionality of Congress' intrusions into areas previously left to the states. Powell wrote "The State's role in our system of government is a matter of Constitutional law, not legislative grace."

=== Rehnquist's dissent ===
Justice Rehnquist's brief dissent expressed reservations as to Justice Powell's description of the standard actually adopted by the court in National League of Cities and of the alternative standard proposed by Justice O'Connor, but reiterated his support of both dissenting opinions based on their opposition to the court's resolution of those constitutional issues in this case and stated his confidence that the National League of Cities standard would eventually again become law by regaining the support of a majority of justices.

=== O'Connor's dissent ===
Justice O'Connor's dissent was joined by Justices Powell and Rehnquist. She acknowledged that changes in the national economy in the previous two hundred years had transformed Congress' Commerce Clause power from a marginal power that served mostly to mediate between the states by eliminating interstate tariffs and other burdens on interstate commerce to a general power that gave Congress essentially unlimited power to regulate in every area of economic life. She argued for special limitations on that power to protect the states' authority over their own employment relations. She invoked the limiting language of the expansive interpretations of the Commerce Clause found in the court's decisions of the 1930s and 1940s to argue that the court retained the power to decide whether a particular exercise of the Commerce Clause authority was necessary and proper for the federal purposes to be achieved. Applying that standard, she would have found the FLSA unconstitutional as applied to employees of state and local governments.

== The impact of the case ==
When the Court confirmed Congress' power to regulate the wage and hour standards applicable to employees of state and local governments, a different, more conservative Congress than the ones that had extended the FLSA to governmental employees in the first place now confronted the complaints from local governments that the Act was too inflexible and expensive to comply with. Congress responded by amending the Act in 1985, allowing governments to offer compensatory time off rather than overtime in some circumstances, creating an exemption for volunteers and excluding certain legislative employees from coverage under the Act. The Act also erased liabilities owed to employees who would not have been covered by the Act as interpreted by the Department of Labor's regulations prior to the Court's decision.

Garcia represents in many ways the high-water mark for the Court's expansive reading of the Commerce Clause to favor centralized national government as opposed to the more decentralized version of federalism, in which the Tenth Amendment limits the authority of the federal government vis à vis the states, as envisioned by Justices Rehnquist and O'Connor. While Chief Justice Rehnquist's later opinion in United States v. Lopez did not purport to overturn Garcia, it reasserted the Court's power to set limits on Congress' authority to invoke the Commerce Clause to regulate in areas that have only an insignificant connection with interstate commerce.

== See also ==
- List of United States Supreme Court cases, volume 469
