= National League of Cities v. Usery =

- Supreme Court of the United States

Argued April 16, 1975 Reargued March 2, 1976 Decided June 24, 1976
- Full case name: The National League of Cities, et al. v. W. J. Usery, Jr., Sec. of Labor
- Citations: 426 U.S. 833 (more) 96 S.Ct. 2465; 49 L. Ed. 2d 245

Case history
- Prior: Nat'l League of Cities v. Brennan, 406 F. Supp. 826 (D.D.C. 1974); temporary injunction granted, 419 U.S. 1321 (1974); probable jurisdiction noted, 420 U.S. 906 (1975).

Holding
- FLSA as applied to state employers was unconstitutional as a violation of Amendment X of the Constitution.

Court membership
- Chief Justice Warren E. Burger Associate Justices William J. Brennan Jr. · Potter Stewart; Byron White · Thurgood Marshall; Harry Blackmun · Lewis F. Powell Jr. William Rehnquist · John P. Stevens

Case opinions
- Majority: Rehnquist, joined by Burger, Stewart, Blackmun, Powell
- Concurrence: Blackmun
- Dissent: Brennan, joined by White, Marshall
- Dissent: Stevens

Laws applied
- Fair Labor Standards Act (FLSA), U.S. Const. amend. X
- Overruled by
- Garcia v. San Antonio Metropolitan Transit Authority, 469 U.S. 528 (1985)
- This case overturned a previous ruling or rulings
- Maryland v. Wirtz, 392 U.S. 183 (1968)

National League of Cities v. Usery, 426 U.S. 833 (1976), was a case in which the Supreme Court of the United States held that the Fair Labor Standards Act could not constitutionally be applied to state governments. The decision was overruled by the U.S. Supreme Court in Garcia v. San Antonio Metropolitan Transit Authority.

== Background ==
National League of Cities v. Usery involved a dispute concerning the extent of the U.S. federal government’s Commerce Clause power to regulate the activities of the states.

The Fair Labor Standards Act (FLSA), which had been upheld in the 1941 Supreme Court case United States v. Darby Lumber Co., was later amended to remove state exemptions pertaining to employees of state institutions. The FLSA imposed on all public employers certain minimum wage standards and maximum work hour limitations, limitations which had previously been restricted to those individual businesses and private employees engaged in interstate commerce. After the amendment, the FLSA applied equally to all state employees, including those in hospitals and schools, which are areas typically thought to be outside the remit of the federal government's interstate commerce power as laid out by the Commerce Clause.

The Supreme Court granted certiorari, and the question presented was whether the Tenth Amendment barred Congress from exercising its commerce power to regulate wages, hours, and benefits of state employees, given that doing so is a power traditionally reserved to states.

== Opinion of the court ==
Relying on language from the 1964 Supreme Court case Heart of Atlanta Motel, Inc. v. United States, Justice William Rehnquist, writing for the majority, acknowledged that Congress may exercise power over private endeavors even when doing so preempts state law so long as the means chosen are reasonably adapted to legitimate ends. However, the court distinguished the case from Darby, arguing that the 10th Amendment implies that Congress cannot exercise its power so as to impair the states' integrity or their ability to function effectively in a federal system. Congress may have the authority to regulate individual businesses under the Commerce Clause, but in this case were regulating not just individuals, but "States as States." Additionally, the court stated that while Congress may have affirmative authority under the Commerce Clause to reach the matter, the Constitution nevertheless prohibits federal regulation of that matter. The court concluded that determinations of state employee wages and compensations, as well as the hours they may work, are "functions essential to separate and independent existence," and that those functions are state plenary powers protected from Congressional infringement. It stated that a law overstepped the federal Commerce Clause power "insofar as ... [it] operate[s] to directly displace the States' freedom to structure integral operations in areas of traditional governmental functions", known as the "traditional government functions" test. To allow otherwise, the majority claimed, would be to neglect the federal system of government embodied by the Constitution. The majority also mentioned that the FLSA's requirements would force states to restructure many of their existing policies, and would thereby result in a substantial cost burden upon the states effectively imposed on them by federal law.

The majority therefore abandoned the reasoning applied in Maryland v. Wirtz, and cited the fears of unchecked power expressed by Justice Douglas in his dissent in that case.

== Blackmun's concurrence ==
Justice Harry Blackmun's brief concurring opinion interpreted the majority view as advocating that the courts use a balancing approach that weighed the importance of the government’s interest against how essential the implicated state functions are to the state’s separate and independent existence. He admitted that he was "not untroubled by certain possible implications of the Court's opinion", but nevertheless agreed with the "traditional government functions" test and came to the conclusion that "the result with respect to the statute under challenge here is necessarily correct."

== Subsequent developments ==
In 1985, the Supreme Court again took up the issue presented by National League of Cities in the case Garcia v. San Antonio Metropolitan Transit Authority. In Garcia, the court overruled National League of Cities and substantially broadened the class of state functions that could be interfered with by federal lawmaking given a legitimate purpose. Justice Potter Stewart had been replaced by Justice Sandra Day O'Connor in the interim, but Stewart and O'Connor both ruled against the federal government, so had all other justices ruled as they did in National League of Cities the result would have been the same. However, Justice Blackmun had in the intervening years switched sides and helped overturn the case, asserting that the "traditional government functions" test he had previously supported had proved "unworkable." He also contended that no test that attempted "to separate out important governmental functions can be faithful to the role of federalism in a democratic society" on the basis that any "rule of state immunity that looks to the ‘traditional,’ ‘integral,’ or ‘necessary’ nature of governmental functions inevitably invites an unelected federal judiciary to make decisions about which state policies it favors and which one it dislikes."

== See also ==
- List of United States Supreme Court cases, volume 426
