= New York v. United States =

- Supreme Court of the United States

Argued March 30, 1992 Decided June 19, 1992
- Full case name: New York, Petitioner, v. United States et al.; County of Allegany, New York, Petitioner, v. United States; County of Cortland, New York, Petitioner, v. United States et al.
- Citations: 505 U.S. 144 (more) 112 S. Ct. 2408; 120 L. Ed. 2d 120; 1992 U.S. LEXIS 3693; Nuclear Reg. Rep. (CCH) ¶ 20,553; 34 ERC 1817; 60 USLW 4603; 22 Envtl. L. Rep. 21,082

Case history
- Prior: 757 F. Supp. 10 (N.D.N.Y. 1990), aff'd, 942 F.2d 114 (2d Cir. 1991), cert. granted, 502 U.S. 1023 (1992).
- Subsequent: 978 F.2d 705 (2d Cir. 1992)

Holding
- The "take title" provision of the Low-Level Radioactive Waste Policy Amendments Act violates the Tenth Amendment and exceeds Congress's power under the Commerce Clause.

Court membership
- Chief Justice William Rehnquist Associate Justices Byron White · Harry Blackmun; John P. Stevens · Sandra Day O'Connor; Antonin Scalia · Anthony Kennedy; David Souter · Clarence Thomas

Case opinions
- Majority: O'Connor, joined by Rehnquist, Scalia, Kennedy, Souter, Thomas; White, Blackmun, Stevens (Parts III-A and III-B)
- Concur/dissent: White, joined by Blackmun, Stevens
- Concur/dissent: Stevens

Laws applied
- U.S. Const. amend. X; U.S. Const. Art. I; Low-Level Radioactive Waste Policy Amendments Act of 1985

New York v. United States, 505 U.S. 144 (1992), was a decision of the United States Supreme Court. Justice Sandra Day O'Connor, writing for the majority, found that the federal government may not require states to “take title” to radioactive waste through the "Take Title" provision of the Low-Level Radioactive Waste Policy Amendments Act, which the Court found to exceed Congress's power under the Commerce Clause. The Court permitted the federal government to induce shifts in state waste policy through other means.

== Background ==
The Low-Level Radioactive Waste Policy Amendments Act was an attempt to imbue a negotiated agreement of states with federal incentives for compliance. The problem of what to do with radioactive waste was a national issue complicated by the political reluctance of the states to deal with the problem individually. New York was a willing participant in the compromise. After the act was passed, it announced locations in the counties of Allegany and Cortland, as potential places for waste storage. Public opposition in both counties was immediate and very determined and eventually helped motivate New York to challenge the law.

The act provided three incentives for states to comply with the agreement. The first incentive, the "monetary" incentive, allowed states to collect gradually increasing surcharges for waste that was received from other states. The Secretary of Energy would then collect a portion of the income and redistribute it to reward states that achieved a series of milestones in waste disposal. The second incentive, the "access" incentive, allowed states to reprimand other states that missed certain deadlines by raising surcharges or eventually denying access to disposal at their facilities completely. The third incentive, the "take title" incentive, required states to "take title" and assume liability for waste generated within their borders if they failed to comply.

== Decision ==
Justice O'Connor wrote the opinion of the court. The court held the first two incentives constitutional and the third unconstitutional. The "monetary" incentive was held to be within Congress's power under the Taxing and Spending Clause. The "access" incentive was also held to be within Congress's power under the Commerce Clause. The "take title" incentive, however, was held to be impermissibly coercive and a threat to state sovereignty, thereby violating the Tenth Amendment.

Justice O'Connor first affirmed the constitutionality of the first two incentives. She then characterized the "take title" incentive as an attempt to commandeer the state governments by directly compelling them to participate in the federal regulatory program. The federal government was described as having "crossed the line distinguishing encouragement from coercion." The distinction was that with respect to the "take title" provision, states had to choose between conforming to federal regulations or taking title to the waste. Since Congress cannot directly force states to legislate according to their scheme, and since Congress likewise cannot force them to take title to radioactive waste, O'Connor reasoned that Congress likewise could not force States to choose between the two impermissible alternatives. She argued that such coercion would be counter to the federalist structure of government, in which a "core of state sovereignty" is enshrined in the Tenth Amendment.

The court found the "take title" provision to be severable and, noting the seriousness of the "pressing national problem" being addressed, allowed the remainder of the act to survive.

== Dissenting opinion ==
Justice White wrote a dissenting opinion that was joined by Justices Blackmun and Stevens. White stressed that the act was a product of "cooperative federalism," as the states "bargained among themselves to achieve compromises for Congress to sanction." Noting that Congress can directly regulate radioactive waste, as opposed to "compelling state legislatures" to regulate according to their scheme, he said that the "ultimate irony of the decision today is that in its formalistically rigid obeisance to 'federalism,' the Court gives Congress fewer incentives to defer to the wishes of state officials in achieving local solutions to local problems."

== See also ==
- List of United States Supreme Court cases, volume 505
- List of United States Supreme Court cases
- Lists of United States Supreme Court cases by volume
- List of United States Supreme Court cases by the Rehnquist Court
- Printz v. United States (1997) (holding that Congress cannot commandeer state executive officials to implement federal policy)
- Murphy v. NCAA (2018) (applying New York to a statute prohibiting State action)
