= Cannabis policy of the Obama administration =

During the presidency of Barack Obama, the government eased enforcement of federal marijuana laws in U.S. states permitting cannabis use.

In contrast, Time reported in 2012, "Two years [after his first year in office], the Obama Administration is cracking down on medical marijuana dispensaries and growers just as harshly as the Administration of George W. Bush did." Moreover, Politico reported that Massachusetts’ Democratic Rep. Barney Frank, referencing his disappointment in the Obama administration’s continued harsh federal enforcement of marijuana in states which passed medicinal legislation, stated, “They look more like the Bush administration than the Clinton administration.” Additionally, in October 2011, the IRS under Obama determined that marijuana dispensaries cannot deduct standard operating expenses such as payroll, rent, & employee health insurance, among others, from their tax returns.

According to Jessica Bulman-Pozen and Gillian E. Metzger in 2016, "in declining to enforce the federal Controlled Substances Act with respect to marijuana offenses in Colorado and Washington, the [Obama] Administration has accommodated those states’ decisions to legalize recreational marijuana use."

== See also ==
- Cole Memorandum
- Eric Holder, served as the 82nd Attorney General of the United States from 2009 to 2015
- Michele Leonhart, former Administrator of the Drug Enforcement Administration
- Political positions of Barack Obama
