= Professional and Amateur Sports Protection Act of 1992 =

U.S. law mostly banning sports gambling

- Long title: An Act to prohibit sports gambling under State law, and for other purposes.
- Acronyms (colloquial): PASPA
- Nicknames: Bradley Act
- Enacted by: the 102nd United States Congress
- Effective: October 28, 1992

Citations
- Public law: 102-559
- Statutes at Large: 106 Stat. 4227

Codification
- Titles amended: 28 U.S.C.: Judiciary and Judicial Procedure
- U.S.C. sections created: 28 U.S.C. ch. 178 § 3701 et seq.

Legislative history
- Introduced in the Senate as S. 474 by Dennis DeConcini (D–AZ) on February 22, 1991; Committee consideration by Senate Judiciary, House Judiciary; Passed the Senate on June 2, 1992 (88–5 Roll call vote 111, via Senate.gov); Passed the House on October 6, 1992 (agreed voice vote) with amendment; Senate agreed to House amendment on October 7, 1992 (agreed voice vote); Signed into law by President George H. W. Bush on October 28, 1992

United States Supreme Court cases
- Struck down by U.S. Supreme Court in Murphy v. National Collegiate Athletic Association on May 14, 2018

The Professional and Amateur Sports Protection Act of 1992 (Pub. L. 102–559), also known as PASPA or the Bradley Act, was a law, judicially overturned in 2018 (via Murphy v. National Collegiate Athletic Association), that was meant to define the legal status of sports betting throughout the United States. This act effectively outlawed sports betting nationwide, excluding a few states.

The sports lotteries conducted in Oregon, Delaware, and Montana were exempt, as well as the licensed sports pools in Nevada. In addition, Congress provided a one-year window of opportunity from the effective date of PASPA (January 1, 1993) for states which operated licensed casino gaming for the previous ten-year period to pass laws permitting sports wagering. The latter exception was clearly crafted with New Jersey in mind. However, New Jersey failed to take advantage of this opportunity. Excluded from the reach of PASPA were jai alai, as well as parimutuel horse and dog racing.

In a May 2018 decision in Murphy v. National Collegiate Athletic Association, the Supreme Court of the United States ruled that PASPA conflicts with the Tenth Amendment.

In less than six years since the repeal of PASPA (as of January 2024), regulated sportsbooks had taken in over $300 billion from sports betting while paying local and state governments over $2 billion.

== History ==
On June 26, 1991, the Senate Judiciary Subcommittee on Patents, Copyrights and Trademarks held public hearings on sports gambling. It found that "Sports gambling is a national problem. The harms it inflicts are felt beyond the borders of those States that sanction it." David Stern, the then-commissioner for the National Basketball Association, testified that "The interstate ramifications of sports betting are a compelling reason for federal legislation." In light of these findings, Congress exercised its authority under the Commerce Clause to enact the Professional and Amateur Sports Protection Act (PASPA) in 1992, codified at 28 U.S.C. § 3701.

== Legislative efforts against the act ==
New Jersey became a leader, both in legislation and in the legal process, in support of the legalization of sports betting in the state, despite its original failure to take advantage of the 1-year carve out in the PASPA. The law is also known as the "Bradley Act", named for New Jersey Senator and former NBA star Bill Bradley. New Jersey voters in 2011 approved a state constitutional amendment that would permit sports gambling. The next year, the state legislature enacted the Sports Wagering Act ("2012 Act"), allowing sports wagering at casinos and racetracks in the state.

== Legal challenges ==
Proponents of repeal typically asserted that the law as written was inherently unconstitutional, as the Tenth Amendment of the U.S. Constitution reserves to the states all rights not explicitly granted to the federal government—such as gambling regulation. While the primarily legal challenge to the law came from New Jersey, other efforts to overturn it had been set in motion before the Supreme Court's decision in May 2018; this included a sports-betting bill being introduced in Kentucky, as well as the other states who were in the process of creating and or passing some form of sports betting legislation and the formation of the pro-repeal American Sports Betting Coalition, a lobby alliance which included the American Gaming Association and the National Indian Gaming Association.

PASPA was formally challenged in the state of New Jersey. In March 2009, New Jersey State Senator Raymond Lesniak filed a lawsuit in the United States District Court for the District of New Jersey claiming, among other things, that the PASPA unconstitutionally discriminated among the states by allowing four states to offer sports betting while disallowing the other forty-six states from enjoying the privilege; however the case was dismissed as the court argued that only then-Governor Chris Christie could bring the suit. At the time, Governor Christie believed it would be difficult to challenge the law. A 2010 referendum showed overwhelming support by state voters to legalize sports gambling, and by 2012, the state passed a law that would allow for sports gambling at licensed locations. This law was challenged by the National Collegiate Athletic Association, the National Basketball Association, the National Football League, the National Hockey League, and Major League Baseball in August 2012, arguing the state's new law violated PASPA. The state argued that they knew the new law likely violated PASPA, but argued that PASPA itself violated the Tenth Amendment's protection against anti-commandeering federal laws that stripped the power of the state to repeal their own sports gambling ban. This case, heard in the United States District Court for the District of New Jersey, found for the sports leagues, dismissing the state's claims regarding PASPA. The state appealed the decision. On September 17, 2013, the Third Circuit Court of Appeals, in a decision by Judge Julio M. Fuentes, found for the sports leagues, again ruling that the state law violated PASPA and enjoined the state from enacting the law. However, the Appeals Court also ruled that PASPA did not prevent New Jersey from repealing any existing laws it had.

Based on the Appeal Court's comment, New Jersey, now with Governor Christie's blessing, passed a new law in 2014 that repealed a former state law that banned sports gambling. The four leagues and the NCAA filed suit against this new law, again arguing that it violated PASPA. The leagues and the NCAA prevailed both in District Court and en banc decisions from the Third Circuit by August 2016, leading the state to petition the Supreme Court of the United States to hear the case. New Jersey appealed this case to the United States Supreme Court, requesting examination of PASPA under the anti-commandeering provisions of the Tenth Amendment.

== US Supreme Court decision ==
The Supreme Court accepted the case in June 2017 and heard oral arguments in December 2017. During this time, Governor Christie's term as governor expired and the term of his successor, Governor Phil Murphy, began; the case before the Court was therefore styled Murphy v. National Collegiate Athletic Association. The case was combined with a separate petition NJ Thoroughbred Horsemen v. NCAA, representing commercial interests related to PASPA. The Court ruled in May 2018 in a 7–2 decision that parts of PASPA were unconstitutional as they commandeered power from the states, and in a 6–3 decision, determined that the whole of PASPA was unconstitutional. In the aftermath of the Court's ruling, numerous states, including New Jersey, proceeded to establish legalized sports betting.
