= Murphy v. National Collegiate Athletic Association =

- Supreme Court of the United States

Argued December 4, 2017 Decided May 14, 2018
- Full case name: Philip D. Murphy, Governor of New Jersey, et al. v. National Collegiate Athletic Association, et al.
- Docket no.: 16-476
- Citations: 584 U.S. 453 (more) 138 S. Ct. 1461; 200 L. Ed. 2d 854

Case history
- Prior: 61 F. Supp. 3d 488 (D.N.J. 2014); affirmed, 799 F.3d 259 (3d Cir. 2015); affirmed on rehearing en banc, 832 F.3d 389 (3d Cir. 2016); cert. granted, 137 S. Ct. 2327 (2017).

Questions presented
- Does a federal statute that prohibits modification or repeal of state-law prohibitions on private conduct impermissibly commandeer the regulatory power of States in contravention of New York v. United States, 505 U.S. 144 (1992)

Holding
- The provision of the Professional and Amateur Sports Protection Act that prohibits state authorization of schemes in sports gambling conflicts with the anticommandeering rule of the Tenth Amendment to the Constitution of the United States of America.

Court membership
- Chief Justice John Roberts Associate Justices Anthony Kennedy · Clarence Thomas; Ruth Bader Ginsburg · Stephen Breyer; Samuel Alito · Sonia Sotomayor; Elena Kagan · Neil Gorsuch

Case opinions
- Majority: Alito, joined by Roberts, Kennedy, Thomas, Kagan, Gorsuch; Breyer (all but Part VI–B)
- Concurrence: Thomas
- Concur/dissent: Breyer
- Dissent: Ginsburg, joined by Sotomayor; Breyer (in part)

Laws applied
- U.S. Const. amend. X

Murphy v. National Collegiate Athletic Association, No. 16-476, 584 U.S. 453 (2018) [138 S. Ct. 1461], was a landmark United States Supreme Court case involving the Tenth Amendment to the United States Constitution. The issue was whether the U.S. federal government has the right to control state lawmaking. The state of New Jersey, represented by Governor Philip D. Murphy, sought to have the Professional and Amateur Sports Protection Act (PASPA) overturned to allow state-sponsored sports betting. The case, formerly titled Christie v. National Collegiate Athletic Association until Governor Chris Christie left office, was combined with NJ Thoroughbred Horsemen v. NCAA, No. 16-477.

The pro-betting side characterized the federal government's position as commandeering of state officials via federal law, which the states would have the responsibility to enforce. The anti-betting side relied on the Supremacy Clause of the U.S. Constitution to keep PASPA in force. The outcome of the case was suggested to be likely to be cited in future cases involving the legalization of cannabis in which a similar state–federal question exists.

On May 14, 2018, the Supreme Court reversed lower courts and sided with New Jersey in deciding that PASPA violated the anticommandeering principle by a 7–2 vote and declaring the entire law unconstitutional by a 6–3 vote. The Supreme Court decision overturned the federal ban on sports gambling and was followed by widespread state-level legalization. By 2026, 27 states had legalized online sports gambling.

== Background ==
In 1992, the U.S. Congress passed the Professional and Amateur Sports Protection Act (PASPA), 28 U.S.C. §§ 3701–3704, to prohibit state-sanctioned sports gambling. The law stated that states may not "sponsor, operate, advertise, promote, license, or authorize by law or compact" sports gambling. The law made exemptions for gambling in four states (Nevada, Delaware, Oregon, and Montana), which had established legal sports gambling regulations in place. New Jersey had attempted to apply for the exemption but failed to act in 1991, when the exemption window closed, in part because of state-level political issues.

From 2010 onward, New Jersey sought to challenge the federal law, as the state recognized that it was losing potential revenue (upwards of US$600 million, as estimated from a 2008 report by financial analysis firm Cantor Fitzgerald) from sports gambling licenses and fees to these four states and illicit offshore entities. State Senators Raymond Lesniak and Stephen M. Sweeney led a lawsuit by the state to challenge the federal law, but it was rejected by the United States District Court in March 2011, which stated that only Governor Chris Christie, through his attorney general's office, could file such a suit. At the time, Christie had been against pursuing any legislation, as he believed it would be difficult to bypass the federal ban.

=== Referendum ===
New Jersey voters in 2011 voted overwhelmingly in a nonbinding referendum to create a state constitutional amendment, which would permit sports gambling. The next year, the New Jersey Legislature enacted the Sports Wagering Act ("2012 Act"), allowing sports wagering at New Jersey casinos and racetracks. In August 2012, the NBA, NFL, NHL, MLB, and NCAA sued under PASPA to enjoin the New Jersey law; they were later joined by the United States Department of Justice; the case was colloquially known as Christie I.

In court hearings, the state argued that it was aware that the 2012 Act violated PASPA, but it contended that PASPA violated the Tenth Amendment's protection against anti-commandeering federal laws by stripping the power of the state to repeal its own sports gambling ban. In February 2013, Judge Michael A. Shipp of the United States District Court for the District of New Jersey rejected the state's argument, and ruled for the leagues by finding that there was "an undisputed direct link between legalized gambling and harm to the Leagues" and granting an injunction against New Jersey from enforcing the 2012 law.

New Jersey appealed to the Third Circuit Court of Appeals, but in a 2–1 split decision, it upheld the District Court's ruling. The Third Circuit opinion noted the distinction between "affirmative authorizations" specifically prevented in PASPA, and the act of repealing the state's law. The opinion stated: "We do not read PASPA to prohibit New Jersey from repealing its ban on sports wagering." The Supreme Court of the United States refused to hear the case by June 2014.

=== Revision of the law ===
Based on the repealing language from the Third Circuit's decision in Christie I, New Jersey State Senator Raymond Lesniak revised the 2012 law with the approval of the Justice Department. The revised bill, instead of authorizing sports gambling, repealed portions of existing New Jersey laws from 1977 that had banned sports gambling and cited the Third Circuit's decision, effectively making sports gambling legal within certain establishments (for example, the bill did not allow for underage gambling or preventing gambling on teams from New Jersey). While it passed the New Jersey Legislature, Governor Christie vetoed it since he believed that it was an attempt to bypass the Third Circuit's ruling. However, in September 2014, Gov. Christie changed his mind and supported the legislation's attempt to grant sports betting rights in the states; within five weeks, Lesniak's new legislation was signed into law.

The five leagues sued the state again in November 2014, creating Christie II. Both the District Court and the Third Circuit found in favor of the leagues that New Jersey's revised law still violated the PASPA. In both courts, the judges saw the act of repealing only portions of previous state laws as equivalent to affirmative authorizations, which still violated PASPA. While the Third Circuit decision was still split, the author of the original decision dissented from the new ruling, which led the state to request an en banc hearing of the full Third Circuit. The full Circuit still favored the leagues 9–3 in its August 2016 decision, which stated that PASPA did not commandeer the states because it did "not command states to take affirmative actions."

== Supreme Court ==
Encouraged by the language in the dissenting opinions from the Third Circuit in Christie II, New Jersey petitioned for a writ of certiorari from the Supreme Court in October 2016. The state specifically asked the question "does a federal statute that prohibits modification or repeal of state-law prohibitions on private conduct impermissibly commandeer the regulatory power of States?," citing New York v. United States, 505 U.S. 144 (1992) as precedent. The Court agreed to hear the case on June 27, 2017. The case was combined with NJ Thoroughbred Horsemen v. NCAA, a petition to the Supreme Court filed by the New Jersey Thoroughbred Horsemen's Association (NJTHA), which had joined the state in its case in the District and Third Circuit Courts. The NJTHA was the licensed permit for gambling at Monmouth Park Racetrack and argued that because of the lower courts' stance on PASPA from Christie II, the economic viability of the Racetrack was at a severe economic disadvantage without legal authority to bet on horse races. While the NJTHA filed their petition separately to reflect the commercial impact of the situation, its question to the Supreme Court was the same; whether PASPA commandeered power from the states.

During the case, Phil Murphy was elected Governor of New Jersey, and the case, initially filed as Christie v. National Collegiate Athletic Association, was renamed Murphy v. National Collegiate Athletic Association.

During the 2016 presidential campaign, then-candidate Donald Trump expressed support for legalized sports betting. In May 2017, Trump appointee and acting Solicitor General Jeff Wall said that New Jersey did not have a case. The Court heard the combined docket oral arguments on December 4, 2017.

=== Opinion of the Court ===
The Court announced a 7–2 judgment in favor of Murphy on May 14, 2018, reversing the Third Circuit. Justice Samuel Alito wrote the majority opinion, joined by Justices John Roberts, Anthony Kennedy, Clarence Thomas, Elena Kagan, and Neil Gorsuch and in part by Justice Stephen Breyer. The majority opinion agreed that §§ 3701(1) of PASPA commandeered power from the states to regulate their own gambling industries and thus was unconstitutional. It followed New York v. United States and reversed the Third Circuit decision. Alito wrote, "Congress can regulate sports gambling directly, but if it elects not to do so, each state is free to act on its own. Our job is to interpret the law Congress has enacted and decide whether it is consistent with the Constitution. PASPA is not." Regarding the distinction between Congress preventing the states from taking an action and Congress requiring the states to take an action, Alito wrote, "This distinction is empty. It was a matter of happenstance that the laws challenged in New York and Printz commanded "affirmative" action as opposed to imposing a prohibition. The basic principle—that Congress cannot issue direct orders to state legislatures—applies in either event."

The Court rejected the respondents' argument that the anti-authorization provision was a valid preemption of state law under the Supremacy Clause of the U.S. Constitution. The Supremacy Clause, the Court argued, "is not an independent grant of legislative power to Congress" but "simply provides a rule of decision." For a federal provision to validly preempt state law, "it must represent the exercise of a power conferred on Congress by the Constitution[,] pointing to the Supremacy Clause will not do", and "since the Constitution confers upon Congress the power to regulate individuals, not States, [the] provision at issue must be best read as one that regulates private actors."

The Court then outlined the three types of preemption, which it illustrated with cases. In Mutual Pharmaceutical Co. v. Bartlett, an example of conflict preemption, federal law enacted under Congress' Commerce Clause authority prohibited generic drug manufacturers from changing the composition or labeling of drugs approved by the Federal Drug Administration, thus state tort law could not force or hold liable a generic drug manufacturer for adding additional information to the FDA-approved label. Express preemption "operates in essentially the same way, but this is often obscured by the language used by Congress in framing preemption provisions." The court illustrated express preemption with Morales v. Trans World Airlines concerning a provision of the Airline Deregulation Act that used language that seemed directed to the states and similar to the issue in Murphy:

[T]o ensure that the States would not undo federal deregulation with regulation of their own, the Act provided that 'no State or political subdivision thereof ... shall enact or enforce any law, rule, regulation, standard, or other provision having the force and effect of law relating to rates, routes, or services of any [covered] air carrier.' This language might appear to operate directly on the States, but it is a mistake to be confused by the way in which a preemption provision is phrased. As we recently explained, we do not require Congress to employ a particular linguistic formulation when preempting state law. And if we look beyond the phrasing employed in the Airline Deregulation Act's preemption provision, it is clear that this provision operates just like any other federal law with preemptive effect. It confers on private entities (i.e., covered carriers) a federal right to engage in certain conduct subject only to certain (federal) constraints."

Field preemption, the third type of preemption, occurs when federal regulation of a "'field' of regulation [is] so comprehensive[] that it has left no room for supplementary state legislation." The Court noted that it had used the same sort of abbreviated description as Congress had done in express preemption, such as involved in Morales, in a 2015 case in which the Court described field preemption: "Congress has forbidden the State to take action in the field that the federal statute pre-empts." However, "in substance, field preemption does not involve congressional commands to the States", but "like all other forms of preemption, it concerns a clash between a constitutional exercise of Congress's legislative power and conflicting state law." The Court then explained why it held that preemption was not applicable to the PASPA provision prohibiting states from authorizing sports betting:

In sum, regardless of the language sometimes used by Congress and this Court, every form of preemption is based on a federal law that regulates the conduct of private actors, not the States. Once this is understood, it is clear that the PASPA provision prohibiting state authorization of sports gambling is not a preemption provision because there is no way in which this provision can be understood as a regulation of private actors. It certainly does not confer any federal rights on private actors interested in conducting sports gambling operations. (It does not give them a federal right to engage in sports gambling.) Nor does it impose any federal restrictions on private actors. If a private citizen or company started a sports gambling operation, either with or without state authorization, §3702(1) would not be violated and would not provide any ground for a civil action by the Attorney General or any other party. Thus, there is simply no way to understand the provision prohibiting state authorization as anything other than a direct command to the States. And that is exactly what the anticommandeering rule does not allow.

A question posed by the majority opinion concerned the severability doctrine that the Supreme Court employed. Under this doctrine, if the Court finds a portion of a law passed by Congress to be unconstitutional, it must then review all other aspects of that law based on the intent of Congress to determine whether some or all of the law must be deemed unconstitutional. Alito and the five other justices who joined his opinion, excluding Breyer, believed that §§ 3701(1) was not severable from the remaining language of PASPA and therefore declared the entire law unconstitutional.

=== Concurrences and dissent ===
In a concurrence, Justice Thomas affirmed that the use of the severability doctrine was the right course of action in the decision but postulated that the Court should revisit the doctrine because it often requires hypothesizing as to the intent of Congress. Justice Breyer, in his concurring/dissenting opinion, disagreed with the court's opinion as to the issue of severability and believed that the rest of the law could remain. Justice Ruth Bader Ginsburg wrote the dissenting opinion, joined by Justice Sonia Sotomayor and in part by Breyer, which stated that the decision to overturn all of PASPA was excessive and based on a desire to legalize sports betting.

== Subsequent developments ==
The oral arguments in the case were generally considered to have gone favorably towards New Jersey, and many commentators believed that the Supreme Court would find that PASPA was unconstitutional. In anticipation of the Court's ruling, several states began setting legislation in place to allow for legal sports gambling contingent on the results of the Supreme Court case. By June 5, 2018, Delaware became the first state other than Nevada to legalize sports gambling in the wake of the court decision. The New Jersey legislature had prepared a bill legalizing sports gambling prior to the Supreme Court ruling and upon the Court's decision formally introduced the bill the same day; the bill had undergone several revisions, and had passed both houses and signed into law by Governor Murphy by June 11, 2018.

In some cases, the leagues became involved in helping to establish the legislation to be favorable for them as well in the event that the court found for New Jersey. The professional leagues, like the NFL, NBA, and NHL, also indicated that they would agree to federally-regulated sports gambling and were preparing their teams, owners, and players for this possibility. The NCAA, representing non-professional players, was more vocal about such allowances unless gambling on college or amateur sports remained banned. The Supreme Court decision only impacted intrastate sports gambling schemes because interstate sports gambling remains illegal under the Federal Wire Act.

With the Court finding in favor of New Jersey, observers believed that its ruling would impact other current federal laws in place that potentially could be considered to have commandeered power from the states and other challenges related to the Tenth Amendment, such as gun ownership rights, immigration enforcement (such as penalizing sanctuary cities), and the legalization of marijuana under state law.
