= MFFA =

MFFA may refer to:

- Montana Firearms Freedom Act
- Master Financial Assistance Facility Agreement, see Second Economic Adjustment Programme for Greece
- My Friends From Afar, a Singaporean TV series
- Mugen Free For All, a forum for the fighting game engine M.U.G.E.N.
