= Gonzales v. Raich =

2005 U.S. Supreme Court ruling regarding cannabis

- Supreme Court of the United States

Argued November 29, 2004 Decided June 6, 2005
- Full case name: Alberto Gonzales, Attorney General, et al. v. Angel McClary Raich, et al.
- Citations: 545 U.S. 1 (more) 125 S. Ct. 2195; 162 L. Ed. 2d 1; 2005 U.S. LEXIS 4656; 73 U.S.L.W. 4407; 18 Fla. L. Weekly Fed. S 327
- Argument: Oral argument
- Opinion announcement: Opinion announcement

Case history
- Prior: Raich v. Ashcroft, 248 F. Supp. 2d 918 (N.D. Cal.), rev'd, 352 F.3d 1222 (9th Cir. 2003), cert. granted, 542 U.S. 936 (2004)
- Subsequent: None

Holding
- Congress may ban the use of cannabis even if states approve it for medicinal purposes.

Court membership
- Chief Justice William Rehnquist Associate Justices John P. Stevens · Sandra Day O'Connor; Antonin Scalia · Anthony Kennedy; David Souter · Clarence Thomas; Ruth Bader Ginsburg · Stephen Breyer

Case opinions
- Majority: Stevens, joined by Kennedy, Souter, Ginsburg, Breyer
- Concurrence: Scalia (in judgment)
- Dissent: O'Connor, joined by Rehnquist, Thomas (all but Part III)
- Dissent: Thomas

Laws applied
- U.S. Const. art. I, § 8, cl. 3, 18 (the Commerce and Necessary and Proper Clauses); Controlled Substances Act, 21 U.S.C. §§ 801–971 (2000); California Compassionate Use Act of 1996, California Health & Safety Code § 11362.5 (West Supp. 2005)

Gonzales v. Raich (previously Ashcroft v. Raich), 545 U.S. 1 (2005), was a decision by the U.S. Supreme Court ruling that, under the Commerce Clause of the U.S. Constitution, Congress may criminalize the production and use of homegrown cannabis even if state law allows its use for medicinal purposes.

== Background ==
California voters passed Proposition 215 in 1996, legalizing the use of medical cannabis. The federal government of the United States has regulated the use of cannabis since the Marihuana Tax Act of 1937 was enacted.

Respondents Angel Raich and Diane Monson used homegrown medicinal cannabis, which was legal under California law but illegal under federal law. On August 15, 2002, Butte County Sheriff's Department officers and agents from the federal Drug Enforcement Administration came to California resident Diane Monson's home. "After a thorough investigation, the county officials concluded that her use of marijuana was entirely lawful as a matter of California law. Nevertheless, after a 3-hour standoff, the federal agents seized and destroyed all six of her cannabis plants". The cannabis plants were illegal Schedule I drugs under the federal Controlled Substances Act (CSA), which is Title II of the Comprehensive Drug Abuse Prevention and Control Act of 1970.

Monson and Raich sued, claiming that enforcing federal law against them would violate the Due Process Clause of the Fifth Amendment, the Ninth Amendment, the Tenth Amendment in excess of the Commerce Clause, and the doctrine of medical necessity. Raich's physician stated that without cannabis, Raich is threatened by excruciating pain. California was one of 14 states at the time (36 as of 2021) that allowed medicinal use of cannabis. California's Compassionate Use Act allows limited use of cannabis for medicinal purposes.

== Raich and Monson's case ==
Raich, of Oakland, California; Monson, of Oroville, California; and two anonymous caregivers sued the government for injunctive and declaratory relief on October 9, 2002, to stop the government from interfering with their right to produce and use medical cannabis claiming that the Controlled Substances Act was unconstitutional as applied to their conduct. Raich and Monson were represented by Randy Barnett.

Raich claimed she used cannabis to keep herself alive. She and her doctor also claimed to have tried dozens of prescription drugs for her numerous medical conditions and that she was allergic to most of them. Her doctor declared under oath that Raich's life was at stake if she could not continue to use cannabis.

Monson suffered from chronic pain from a car accident a decade before the case. She used cannabis to relieve the pain and muscle spasms around her spine.

== Government's case ==
The Controlled Substances Act does not recognize the medical use of cannabis. Agents from the federal Drug Enforcement Administration were assigned to break up California's medical cannabis co-ops and to seize their assets. That was the result of the fact that federal law pre-empted, under the Supremacy Clause, the law of California. The government argued that if a single exception were made to the Controlled Substances Act, it would become unenforceable in practice. The government also contended that consuming one's locally grown cannabis for medical purposes affects the interstate market of cannabis and the federal government may thus regulate and prohibit such consumption.

That argument stems from the landmark New Deal case Wickard v. Filburn, which held that the government may regulate personal cultivation and consumption of crops because of the aggregate effect of individual consumption on the government's legitimate statutory framework governing the interstate wheat market.

== Litigation ==
On December 16, 2003, the Ninth Circuit Court of Appeals granted a preliminary injunction to prevent the federal government from interfering with Raich and Monson: "We find that the appellants have demonstrated a strong likelihood of success on their claim that, as applied to them, the Controlled Substances Act is an unconstitutional exercise of Congress' Commerce Clause authority."

== Organizations involved ==
Partnership for a Drug-Free America, several other antidrug organizations, and an alliance of seven Representatives, including Mark Souder and Katherine Harris, all filed amicus briefs for the side of federal government. An environmentalist group, Community Rights Council, also filed a brief for the government for fear that limitation of federal power would undermine its agenda.

The Cato Institute, Institute for Justice, many libertarian organizations, and the National Organization for the Reform of Marijuana Laws, along with other groups opposing the war on drugs, filed briefs for Raich and Monson. The governments of California, Maryland, and Washington also filed briefs supporting Raich. The attorneys general of Alabama, Louisiana, and Mississippi, three strongly antidrug states from the conservative South, filed a brief supporting Raich, on the grounds of states' rights.

== Decision ==
The ruling was 6–3 with Justice Stevens writing the opinion of the court, joined by Justices Kennedy, Ginsburg, Souter and Breyer. A concurring opinion was filed by Justice Scalia.

The opinion began by pointing out that the respondents did not dispute that Congress had the power to control or ban cannabis for non-medical uses:

Respondents in this case do not dispute that passage of the CSA, as part of the Comprehensive Drug Abuse Prevention and Control Act, was well within Congress' commerce power. Nor do they contend that any provision or section of the CSA amounts to an unconstitutional exercise of congressional authority. Rather, respondents' challenge is actually quite limited; they argue that the CSA's categorical prohibition of the manufacture and possession of marijuana as applied to the intrastate manufacture and possession of marijuana for medical purposes pursuant to California law exceeds Congress' authority under the Commerce Clause.

Banning the growing of cannabis for medical use, the Court reasoned, was a permissible way of preventing or limiting access to cannabis for other uses:

Even respondents acknowledge the existence of an illicit market in marijuana; indeed, Raich has personally participated in that market, and Monson expresses a willingness to do so in the future. More concretely, one concern prompting inclusion of wheat grown for home consumption in the 1938 Act was that rising market prices could draw such wheat into the interstate market, resulting in lower market prices. Wickard, 317 U.S., at 128. The parallel concern making it appropriate to include marijuana grown for home consumption in the CSA is the likelihood that the high demand in the interstate market will draw such marijuana into that market. While the diversion of homegrown wheat tended to frustrate the federal interest in stabilizing prices by regulating the volume of commercial transactions in the interstate market, the diversion of homegrown marijuana tends to frustrate the federal interest in eliminating commercial transactions in the interstate market in their entirety. In both cases, the regulation is squarely within Congress' commerce power because production of the commodity meant for home consumption, be it wheat or marijuana, has a substantial effect on supply and demand in the national market for that commodity.

The relevant precedents for the Court's analysis are Wickard v. Filburn (1942), United States v. Lopez (1995), and United States v. Morrison (2000).

=== Scalia's opinion ===
Justice Scalia wrote a separate concurrence that had the effect of differentiating the decision from the previous results of United States v. Lopez and United States v. Morrison. In a departure from his originalist interpretation of the Constitution (he had voted for limits on the Commerce Clause in the Lopez and Morrison decisions), Scalia said his understanding of the Necessary and Proper Clause caused him to vote for the Commerce Clause with Raich for the following reason:

Congress may regulate noneconomic intrastate activities … where the failure to do so "could … undercut" its regulation of interstate commerce.

…

That simple possession is a noneconomic activity is immaterial to whether it can be prohibited as a necessary part of a larger regulation. Rather, Congress’s authority to enact all of these prohibitions of intrastate controlled-substance activities depends only upon whether they are appropriate means of achieving the legitimate end of eradicating Schedule I substances from interstate commerce.

By this measure, I think the regulation must be sustained. Not only is it impossible to distinguish “controlled substances manufactured and distributed intrastate” from “controlled substances manufactured and distributed interstate,” but it hardly makes sense to speak in such terms. Drugs like marijuana are fungible commodities. … [M]arijuana that is grown at home and possessed for personal use is never more than an instant from the interstate market—and this is so whether or not the possession is for medicinal use or lawful use under the laws of a particular State.

== Dissenting opinions ==
Justice O'Connor dissented joined by Chief Justice William Rehnquist, who authored the majority opinions in United States v. Lopez and United States v. Morrison, and Justice Clarence Thomas, who wrote concurring opinions in Lopez and Morrison. O'Connor began her opinion by citing Lopez, which she followed with a reference to Justice Louis Brandeis's dissenting opinion in New State Ice Co. v. Liebmann:

We enforce the "outer limits" of Congress' Commerce Clause authority not for their own sake, but to protect historic spheres of state sovereignty from excessive federal encroachment and thereby to maintain the distribution of power fundamental to our federalist system of government. United States v. Lopez, 514 U. S. 549, 557 (1995); NLRB v. Jones & Laughlin Steel Corp., 301 U. S. 1, 37 (1937). One of federalism's chief virtues, of course, is that it promotes innovation by allowing for the possibility that "a single courageous State may, if its citizens choose, serve as a laboratory; and try novel social and economic experiments without risk to the rest of the country." New State Ice Co. v. Liebmann, 285 U. S. 262, 311 (1932) (Brandeis, J., dissenting).

She concluded:

Relying on Congress’ abstract assertions, the Court has endorsed making it a federal crime to grow small amounts of marijuana in one’s own home for one’s own medicinal use. This overreaching stifles an express choice by some States, concerned for the lives and liberties of their people, to regulate medical marijuana differently. If I were a California citizen, I would not have voted for the medical marijuana ballot initiative; if I were a California legislator I would not have supported the Compassionate Use Act. But whatever the wisdom of California’s experiment with medical marijuana, the federalism principles that have driven our Commerce Clause cases require that room for experiment be protected in this case.

Justice Thomas also wrote a separate dissent, stating in part:

Respondents Diane Monson and Angel Raich use marijuana that has never been bought or sold, that has never crossed state lines, and that has had no demonstrable effect on the national market for marijuana. If Congress can regulate this under the Commerce Clause, then it can regulate virtually anything—and the Federal Government is no longer one of limited and enumerated powers.

Respondent's local cultivation and consumption of marijuana is not "Commerce ... among the several States."

[...]

Certainly no evidence from the founding suggests that "commerce" included the mere possession of a good or some personal activity that did not involve trade or exchange for value. In the early days of the Republic, it would have been unthinkable that Congress could prohibit the local cultivation, possession, and consumption of marijuana.

[...]

If the Federal Government can regulate growing a half-dozen cannabis plants for personal consumption (not because it is interstate commerce, but because it is inextricably bound up with interstate commerce), then Congress' Article I powers – as expanded by the Necessary and Proper Clause – have no meaningful limits. Whether Congress aims at the possession of drugs, guns, or any number of other items, it may continue to "appropria[te] state police powers under the guise of regulating commerce."

[...]

If the majority is to be taken seriously, the Federal Government may now regulate quilting bees, clothes drives, and potluck suppers throughout the 50 States. This makes a mockery of Madison's assurance to the people of New York that the "powers delegated" to the Federal Government are "few and defined", while those of the States are "numerous and indefinite."

== Subsequent developments ==
Both Raich and Monson have indicated their intention to continue using cannabis for medical use, in spite of the ruling and federal law on the subject.

Two days after the ruling, the International Narcotics Control Board issued a statement indicating that the Board "welcomes the decision of the United States Supreme Court, made on 6 June, reaffirming that the cultivation and use of cannabis, even if it is for medical use, should be prohibited." Its president, Hamid Ghodse, noted, "Cannabis is classified under international conventions as a drug with a number of personal and public health problems" and referred to the drug's Schedule I status, under the Single Convention on Narcotic Drugs.

Soon after the decision in Raich, the Supreme Court vacated a lower court decision in United States v. Stewart and remanded it to the court of appeals for reconsideration in light of Raich. On remand, the Ninth Circuit held that Congress had power under the Commerce Clause to criminalize the possession of homemade machine guns, just as it had the power to criminalize homegrown cannabis.

In 2007, the Ninth Circuit decided against Raich, when she renewed her litigation on substantive due process grounds. Judge Harry Pregerson, the author of the opinion, noted that a minority of states had legalized medical cannabis but that under federal law, it is not a recognized "fundamental right" under the due process clause:

For now, federal law is blind to the wisdom of a future day when the right to use medical marijuana to alleviate excruciating pain may be deemed fundamental. Although that day has not yet dawned, considering that during the last ten years eleven states have legalized the use of medical marijuana, that day may be upon us sooner than expected. Until that day arrives, federal law does not recognize a fundamental right to use medical marijuana prescribed by a licensed physician to alleviate excruciating pain and human suffering.

In 2009, the Department of Justice under Attorney General Eric Holder issued new guidelines allowing for no longer enforcing of the federal ban in some situations:

It will not be a priority to use federal resources to prosecute patients with serious illnesses or their caregivers who are complying with state laws on medical marijuana, but we will not tolerate drug traffickers who hide behind claims of compliance with state law to mask activities that are clearly illegal.

When C-SPAN's Brian Lamb interviewed former Justice John Paul Stevens about Stevens's book, Five Chiefs, Stevens cited Raich as a case in which he upheld the law even if he deplored the policy.

In Congress, to counter the effect of this ruling, Representative Maurice Hinchey (D-NY) and Dana Rohrabacher (R-CA) annually introduced legislation to stop the Department of Justice from arresting and prosecuting medical cannabis patients. This effort succeeded for the first time as the Rohrabacher–Farr amendment to the omnibus federal spending bill for the 2015 fiscal year (section 538), which was enacted on December 16, 2014.

In 2021, Justice Thomas commented on Raich in a statement in Standing Akimbo, LLC v. United States. The case was brought by a Denver, Colorado dispensary by Thorburn Law Group, LLC with respect to 280E. He noted that the reasoning in Raich was predicated upon the need to prohibit intrastate trafficking of cannabis to "avoid a 'gaping hole' in Congress' 'closed regulatory system'" prohibiting interstate trafficking of cannabis. Justice Thomas observed that the federal government's modern practice of turning a blind eye toward cannabis possession in the 36 states that have legalized it therefore undercut the reasoning in Raich, suggesting that Raich should be revisited.

== See also ==
- Aggregate effects doctrine
- Canna Provisions v. Garland
- Legal history of cannabis in the United States
- List of United States Supreme Court cases, volume 545
- List of United States Supreme Court cases
- Marijuana Control, Regulation, and Education Act
- Separate sovereigns
- South Dakota v. Dole (1987)
- Taylor v. United States (2016) (interpreting a statute in light of Raich)
- Wickard v. Filburn (1942) (the case on which Raich relied)
