= Montana Firearms Freedom Act =

Invalidated state statute in Montana, U.S.

The Montana Firearms Freedom Act is a state statute (since held invalid by Federal courts) that sought to exempt firearms manufactured in Montana from federal regulation under the interstate commerce and supremacy clauses of the United States Constitution.

== Provisions ==
The law declares that firearms manufactured in the state of Montana after October 1, 2009, and which remain in the state, are exempt from United States federal firearms regulations, provided that these items are clearly stamped "Made in Montana" on a central metallic part.

It applies to all firearms other than fully automatic weapons, firearms that cannot be carried and used by one person, and firearms with a bore diameter greater than 1½ inch which use smokeless powder. It also applies to ammunition (except exploding projectiles), and accessories such as suppressors.

The law has no requirements for registration, background checks or dealer licensing.

== Legislative history ==
The bill was introduced January 13, 2009, by Joel Boniek, Gerald Bennett, Edward Butcher, Aubyn Curtiss, Lee Randall and Wendy Warburton. It was signed into law by Governor Brian Schweitzer on April 15, 2009, and became effective on October 1, 2009. However, as noted below, the law never had the intended effect on federal regulation of firearms.

This law was codified at Chapter 205 in Title 30, of the Montana Code Annotated.

== Rationale ==
The legislature declared that the authority for this law is derived from the Second, Ninth and Tenth amendments from the Bill of Rights to the United States Constitution. This act reaffirmed the right of the people to keep and bear arms. It guarantees to the people rights not mentioned in the constitution, as well as to the states and their people all powers not granted to the federal government elsewhere in the constitution. The law also stated that Article II, section 12, of the Montana constitution prohibits government interference with the right of individual Montana citizens to keep and bear arms.

Some supporters asserted that the legislation was also about curbing excessive Federal regulation in areas such as education, animal management and intrastate trade.

The drafters of the law intended that it would form a legal challenge to the federal regulation of firearms by the Bureau of Alcohol, Tobacco, Firearms and Explosives.

== Other similar legislation ==
Similar laws were subsequently passed in Alaska, Arizona, Idaho, South Dakota, Utah, Tennessee, Kansas, and Wyoming. Attempts to do so have also been made in Florida, Georgia, Indiana, Kentucky, Louisiana, Michigan, Minnesota, Missouri, New Hampshire, Ohio, Oklahoma, Oregon, Pennsylvania, South Carolina, Texas, Virginia, West Virginia and Washington.

== ATF response to Montana proposing Firearms Freedom Act ==
On July 16, 2009, the Bureau of Alcohol, Tobacco, Firearms and Explosives published an open letter to Montana Federal Firearms Licensees, clarifying the bureau's position on the Montana Firearms Freedom Act. According to this letter, "...because the Act conflicts with Federal firearms laws and regulations, Federal law supersedes the Act, and all provisions of the Gun Control Act and the National Firearms Act, and their corresponding regulations, continue to apply." The letter then summarizes ATF requirements for FFL holders.

On August 24, 2009, the Montana Shooting Sports Association and the Second Amendment Foundation announced that they were planning on filing a lawsuit on October 1, 2009 — the date that the Montana Firearms Freedom Act became effective — to stop federal regulations from being enforced for the firearms covered under the new state law.

== Legal challenge ==
Based on the Montana law, plaintiffs challenged the continued enforcement of federal gun laws, in federal district court, on October 1, 2009. These plaintiffs are the Montana Shooting Sports Association, the Second Amendment Foundation, and MSSA president Gary Marbut. The legal complaint states that Marbut "wishes to manufacture and sell small arms and small arms ammunition to customers exclusively in Montana, pursuant to the MFFA, without complying with the NFA or the GCA, or other applicable federal laws."

On September 29, 2010, U.S. District Court Judge Donald Molloy dismissed the suit "for lack of subject matter jurisdiction and failure to state a claim."

The Plaintiffs filed an appeal with the United States Court of Appeals for the Ninth Circuit. In a decision issued on August 23, 2013, the Ninth Circuit ruled that the U.S. District Court erred in concluding that the Plaintiff's lacked standing but, after considering the merits of the case, affirmed the dismissal of the action for failure to state a claim. Relying on the United States Supreme Court's decision in Gonzales v. Raich, 545 U.S. 1 (2005), and the court's own precedent in United States v. Stewart, 451 F.3d 1071 (9th Cir. 2006), the Ninth Circuit panel unanimously ruled that Congress could regulate the internal manufacture of firearms within Montana because the creation and circulation of such firearms could reasonably be expected to impact the market for firearms nationally. A majority of the panel, over the dissent of Judge Bea, went further to hold that the Montana Firearms Freedom Act was preempted by the federal licensing law. Two petitions for a writ of certiorari sought to bring the matter before the United States Supreme Court, but the writ was denied in both instances.

== See also ==
- Nullification (U.S. Constitution)
