= Wickard v. Filburn =

1942 US Supreme Court decision

- Supreme Court of the United States

Argued May 4, 1942 Reargued October 12, 1942 Decided November 9, 1942
- Full case name: Claude R. Wickard, Secretary of Agriculture, et al. v. Roscoe C. Filburn
- Citations: 317 U.S. 111 (more) 63 S. Ct. 82; 87 L. Ed. 122; 1942 U.S. LEXIS 1046
- Decision: Opinion

Case history
- Prior: Injunction granted to plaintiff, Filburn v. Helke, 43 F. Supp. 1017 (S.D. Ohio 1942); probable jurisdiction noted, 62 S. Ct. 919 (1942).

Holding
- Production quotas under the Agricultural Adjustment Act of 1938 were constitutionally applied to agricultural production that was consumed purely intrastate because its effect upon interstate commerce placed it within the power of Congress to regulate under the Commerce Clause.

Court membership
- Chief Justice Harlan F. Stone Associate Justices Owen Roberts · Hugo Black; Stanley F. Reed · Felix Frankfurter; William O. Douglas · Frank Murphy; Robert H. Jackson

Case opinion
- Majority: Jackson, joined by unanimous

Laws applied
- U.S. Const. amends. I, V; 7 U.S.C. § 1281, et. seq. (1941) (Agricultural Adjustment Act of 1938)

Wickard v. Filburn, 317 U.S. 111 (1942), is a landmark United States Supreme Court decision that dramatically increased the regulatory power of the federal government. It remains as one of the most important and far-reaching cases concerning the New Deal, and it set a precedent for an expansive reading of the U.S. Constitution's Commerce Clause for decades to come. The goal of the legal challenge was to end the entire federal crop support program by declaring it unconstitutional.

An Ohio farmer, Roscoe Filburn, was growing wheat to feed animals on his own farm. The U.S. government had established limits on wheat production, based on the acreage owned by a farmer, to stabilize wheat prices and supplies. Filburn grew more than was permitted and so was ordered to pay a penalty. In response, he said that because his wheat was not sold, it could not be regulated as commerce, let alone "interstate" commerce (described in the Constitution as "Commerce ... among the several states"). The Supreme Court disagreed: "Whether the subject of the regulation in question was 'production', 'consumption', or 'marketing' is, therefore, not material for purposes of deciding the question of federal power before us. ... But even if appellee's activity be local and though it may not be regarded as commerce, it may still, whatever its nature, be reached by Congress if it exerts a substantial economic effect on interstate commerce and this irrespective of whether such effect is what might at some earlier time have been defined as 'direct' or 'indirect'."

The Supreme Court interpreted the Constitution's Commerce Clause, in Article I, Section 8, of the Constitution, which permits the U.S. Congress "to regulate Commerce with foreign Nations, and among the several States, and with the Indian Tribes". The Court decided that Filburn's wheat-growing activities reduced the amount of wheat he would buy for animal feed on the open market, which is traded nationally, is thus interstate, and is therefore within the scope of the Commerce Clause. Although Filburn's relatively small amount of production of more wheat than he was allotted would not affect interstate commerce itself, the cumulative actions of thousands of other farmers like Filburn would become substantial. Therefore, the Court decided that the federal government could regulate Filburn's production.

== Background ==
The Agricultural Adjustment Act of 1938 limited the area that farmers could devote to wheat production. Its stated purpose was to stabilize the price of wheat in the national market by controlling the amount of wheat produced. It was motivated by a belief by Congress that great international fluctuations in the supply and the demand for wheat were leading to wide swings in the price of wheat, which were deemed to be harmful to the U.S. agricultural economy.

The Supreme Court's decision states that the parties had stipulated as to the economic conditions leading to passage of the legislation:

The parties have stipulated a summary of the economics of the wheat industry. ... The wheat industry has been a problem industry for some years. Largely as a result of increased foreign production and import restrictions, annual exports of wheat and flour from the United States during the ten-year period ending in 1940 averaged less than 10 percent of total production, while, during the 1920s, they averaged more than 25 percent. The decline in the export trade has left a large surplus in production which, in connection with an abnormally large supply of wheat and other grains in recent years, caused congestion in a number of markets; tied up railroad cars, and caused elevators in some instances to turn away grains, and railroads to institute embargoes to prevent further congestion. Many countries, both importing and exporting, have sought to modify the impact of the world market conditions on their own economy. Importing countries have taken measures to stimulate production and self-sufficiency. The four large exporting countries of Argentina, Australia, Canada, and the United States have all undertaken various programs for the relief of growers. Such measures have been designed, in part at least, to protect the domestic price received by producers. Such plans have generally evolved towards control by the central government. In the absence of regulation, the price of wheat in the United States would be much affected by world conditions. During 1941, producers who cooperated with the Agricultural Adjustment program received an average price on the farm of about $1.16 a bushel, as compared with the world market price of 40 cents a bushel.

Roscoe Filburn was a farmer in what is now suburban Dayton, Ohio. He admitted producing wheat in excess of the amount permitted. He maintained, however, that the excess wheat was produced for his private consumption on his own farm. Since it never entered commerce at all, much less interstate commerce, he argued that it was not a proper subject of federal regulation under the Commerce Clause.

In July 1940, pursuant to the Agricultural Adjustment Act (AAA) of 1938, Filburn's 1941 allotment was established at 11.1 acres (4.5 ha) and a normal yield of 20.1 bushels of wheat per acre (1.4 metric tons per hectare). Filburn was given notice of the allotment in July 1940, before the fall planting of his 1941 crop of wheat, and again in July 1941, before it was harvested. Despite the notices, Filburn planted 23 acres (9.3 ha) and harvested 239 more bushels (6,500 kg) than was allowed from his 11.9 acres (4.8 ha) of excess area.

The Federal District Court ruled in favor of Filburn. The Act required an affirmative vote of farmers by plebiscite to implement the quota. Much of the District Court decision related to the way in which the U.S. Secretary of Agriculture had campaigned for passage: the District Court had held that the Secretary's comments were improper. The government then appealed to the Supreme Court, which called the District Court's holding (against the campaign methods that led to passage of the quota by farmers) a "manifest error". The Court then went on to uphold the Act under the Interstate Commerce Clause.

By the time that the case reached the high court, eight out of the nine justices had been appointed by President Franklin Roosevelt, the architect of the New Deal legislation. In addition, the case was heard during wartime, shortly after the attack on Pearl Harbor galvanized the United States to enter the Second World War. The decision supported the President by holding that the Constitution allowed the federal government to regulate economic activity that was only indirectly related to interstate commerce.

== Decision ==
The Act's intended rationale was to stabilize the price of wheat on the national market. The federal government has the power to regulate interstate commerce by the Commerce Clause of the Constitution. In this decision, the Court unanimously reasoned that the power to regulate the price at which commerce occurs was inherent in the power to regulate commerce.

Filburn argued that since the excess wheat that he produced was intended solely for home consumption, his wheat production could not be regulated through the Interstate Commerce Clause. The Supreme Court rejected the argument and reasoned that if Filburn had not produced his own wheat, he would have bought wheat on the open market.

That effect on interstate commerce, the Court reasoned, may not be substantial from the actions of Filburn alone, but the cumulative actions of thousands of other farmers just like Filburn would certainly make the effect become substantial.

Therefore, Congress could regulate wholly intrastate, non-commercial activity if such activity, viewed in the aggregate, would have a substantial effect on interstate commerce, even if the individual effects are trivial.

Some of the parties' argument had focused on prior decisions, especially those relating to the Dormant Commerce Clause, in which the Court had tried to focus on whether a commercial activity was local or not. Justice Robert H. Jackson's decision rejected that approach as too formulaic:

The Government's concern lest the Act be held to be a regulation of production or consumption rather than of marketing is attributable to a few dicta and decisions of this Court which might be understood to lay it down that activities such as "production", "manufacturing", and "mining" are strictly "local" and, except in special circumstances which are not present here, cannot be regulated under the commerce power because their effects upon interstate commerce are, as matter of law, only "indirect". Even today, when this power has been held to have great latitude, there is no decision of this Court that such activities may be regulated where no part of the product is intended for interstate commerce or intermingled with the subjects thereof. We believe that a review of the course of decision under the Commerce Clause will make plain, however, that questions of the power of Congress are not to be decided by reference to any formula which would give controlling force to nomenclature such as "production" and "indirect" and foreclose consideration of the actual effects of the activity in question upon interstate commerce.

The issue was not how one characterized the activity as local. Rather, it was whether the activity "exerts a substantial economic effect on interstate commerce":

Whether the subject of the regulation in question was "production", "consumption", or "marketing" is, therefore, not material for purposes of deciding the question of federal power before us. That an activity is of local character may help in a doubtful case to determine whether Congress intended to reach it. ... But even if appellee's activity be local and though it may not be regarded as commerce, it may still, whatever its nature, be reached by Congress if it exerts a substantial economic effect on interstate commerce and this irrespective of whether such effect is what might at some earlier time have been defined as "direct" or "indirect".

The regulation of local production of wheat was rationally related to Congress's goal: to stabilize prices by limiting the total supply of wheat produced and consumed. It was clear, the Court held,

that a factor of such volume and variability as home-consumed wheat would have a substantial influence on price and market conditions. ... Home-grown wheat in this sense competes with wheat in commerce. The stimulation of commerce is a use of the regulatory function quite as definitely as prohibitions or restrictions thereon. This record leaves us in no doubt that Congress may properly have considered that wheat consumed on the farm where grown, if wholly outside the scheme of regulation, would have a substantial effect in defeating and obstructing its purpose to stimulate trade therein at increased prices.

== Aftermath ==
Wickard marked the beginning of the Supreme Court's total deference to the claims of the U.S. Congress to Commerce Clause powers until the 1990s. The Court's own decision, however, emphasizes the role of the democratic electoral process in confining the abuse of the power of Congress: "At the beginning Chief Justice Marshall described the Federal commerce power with a breadth never yet exceeded. He made emphatic the embracing and penetrating nature of this power by warning that effective restraints on its exercise must proceed from political rather than from judicial processes."

Critics have noted that under Wickard there is "no distinction between 'interstate' and 'intrastate' commerce to place any limits on Congress' authority under the Commerce Clause", and that it allows regulation of activity that is generally not considered commerce.

According to Earl M. Maltz, Wickard and other New Deal decisions gave Congress "the authority to regulate private economic activity in a manner near limitless in its purview."

That remained the case until United States v. Lopez (1995), which was the first decision in nearly six decades to invalidate a federal statute on the grounds that it exceeded the power of the Congress under the Commerce Clause. The opinion described Wickard as "perhaps the most far reaching example of Commerce Clause authority over intrastate commerce" and judged that it "greatly expanded the authority of Congress beyond what is defined in the Constitution under that Clause."

In Lopez, the Court held that while Congress had broad lawmaking authority under the Commerce Clause, the power was limited and did not extend so far from "commerce" as to authorize the regulation of the carrying of handguns, especially when there was no evidence that carrying them affected the economy on a massive scale. (In a later case, United States v. Morrison, the Court ruled in 2000 that Congress could not make such laws even when there was evidence of aggregate effect.)

The Supreme Court has since relied heavily on Wickard in upholding the power of the federal government to prosecute individuals who grow their own medicinal marijuana pursuant to state law. The Supreme Court would hold in Gonzales v. Raich (2005) that like with the home-grown wheat at issue in Wickard, home-grown marijuana is a legitimate subject of federal regulation because it competes with marijuana that moves in interstate commerce:

Wickard thus establishes that Congress can regulate purely intrastate activity that is not itself "commercial", in that it is not produced for sale, if it concludes that failure to regulate that class of activity would undercut the regulation of the interstate market in that commodity.

In 2012, Wickard was central to arguments in National Federation of Independent Business v. Sebelius and Florida v. United States Department of Health and Human Services on the constitutionality of the individual mandate of the Affordable Care Act, with both supporters and opponents of the mandate claiming that Wickard supported their positions.

== See also ==
- Gonzales v. Raich (2005)
