= Aggregate effects doctrine =

Legal doctrine in US federal law

The Aggregate effects doctrine, cumulative effects doctrine, or substantial effects doctrine is a doctrine of United States constitutional law. The AED permits extension of the regulation of interstate commerce into any action that, in the aggregate, affects interstate commerce. It is most often associated with Wickard v. Filburn (1942). In Wickard, a wheat farmer growing wheat solely for animal feed within the confines of his own farm was found to be regulatable because private growth for private consumption was the primary reason for decrease of demand.

Although mostly associated with Wickard, it is also referred to as "substantial effects" in another formative case the preceding year called U.S. v. Darby Lumber Co. (1941). In the previous term the same idea was the reasoning for the decision of National Labor Relations Board v. Fainblatt. In Fainblatt, the "plenary" power of interstate regulation "extends to all such commerce be it great or small" and had never been held "to be constitutionally restricted because in any particular case the volume of the commerce affected may be small."

Since its introduction this doctrine has been applied widely. One common example is alcohol laws, such as Michigan's well known wine shipment restrictions; it is the basis of the influential NFIB v. Sebelius (2012) and some experts apply aggregate effects to the abortion law debate.

This doctrine is differently applied in tax and other cases and its effects upon firm decisions to enter or not enter interstate markets remains unclear.

== See also ==
- Wickard v. Filburn
- Perez v. United States (1971)
- Hodel v. Indiana
- Hodel v. Virginia Surface Mining & Reclamation Assocation
- United States v. Lopez
- United States v. Morrison
- Gonzales v. Raich
- National Federation of Independent Business v. Sebelius
