= United States v. Stewart (2003) =

United States Court of Appeals for the Ninth Circuit case

- Court: United States Court of Appeals for the Ninth Circuit
- Full case name: United States of America v. Robert Wilson Stewart, Jr..
- Argued: August 5, 2003
- Decided: November 13, 2003
- Citations: 348 F.3d 1132 (9th Cir. 2003); 451 F.3d 1071 (9th Cir. 2006)

Court membership
- Judges sitting: Alex Kozinski, Thomas G. Nelson, Jane A. Restani

United States v. Stewart, 348 F.3d 1132 (9th Cir. 2003) and 451 F.3d 1071 (9th Cir. 2006), is a Ninth Circuit case involving a challenge to the constitutionality of 18 U.S.C. § 922(o) under the Commerce Clause of the United States Constitution. The United States Court of Appeals for the Ninth Circuit found against the defendant, ruling that possession of homemade machine guns can be constitutionally regulated by the United States Congress under the Commerce Clause.

== Background ==
Robert W. Stewart, Jr., a convicted felon, sold parts kits to make Maadi-Griffin .50 caliber rifles, which he advertised on the Internet and in Shotgun News. A Bureau of Alcohol, Tobacco, Firearms, and Explosives agent discovered that Stewart had a prior conviction for possession and transfer of a machine gun 18 U.S.C. § 922(o) and began an investigation. An undercover agent purchased kits and determined that it could be "readily . . . converted" into an unlawful firearm, in violation of 18 U.S.C. § 922(a)(1)(A) and 18 U.S.C. § 921(a)(3)(A). The ATF agent then applied for and received a federal search warrant for Stewart's residence.

During a search by the ATF of the Stewart Residence, agents discovered thirty-one firearms, including five machine guns which Stewart had machined and assembled. In United States District Court for the District of Arizona, Stewart was convicted of one count for being a felon in possession of a firearm under 18 U.S.C. § 922(g)(1) and 18 U.S.C. § 924(a)(2), and five counts for unlawful possession of a machine gun in violation of 18 U.S.C. § 922(o). On June 3, 2002, Stewart was sentenced to five years in federal prison. Stewart appealed his conviction under 18 U.S.C. § 922(o), claiming it exceeds Congress's commerce clause power and violates the Second Amendment, and for possession of a firearm by a felon on Second Amendment grounds.

== Circuit Court ==
On November 13, 2003, the Ninth Circuit Court of Appeals issued an opinion vacating Stewart's conviction for violating 18 U.S.C. § 922(o), but affirmed his convictions for being a felon in possession of a firearm. Using the Morrison test, the Ninth Circuit ruled 18 U.S.C. § 922(o) did not have a substantial effect on interstate commerce and was unconstitutional as applied. In its opinion the circuit court wrote:

- "...a homemade machine gun may be part of a gun collection or may be crafted as a hobby. Or it may be used for illegal purposes. Whatever its intended use, without some evidence that it will be sold or transferred—and there is none here—its relationship to interstate commerce is greatly attenuated."
- "...section 922(o) contains no jurisdictional element anchoring the prohibited activity to interstate commerce."
- "...there is no evidence that section 922(o) was enacted to regulate commercial aspects of the machine gun business. More likely, section 922(o) was intended to keep machine guns out of the hands of criminals—an admirable goal, but not a commercial one."

== Supreme Court ==
After the Ninth Circuit's ruling, the United States Department of Justice then requested and received a stay while it appealed the case to the Supreme Court of the United States.

Citing the results of the Gonzales v. Raich case (June 5, 2005), the Supreme Court decided not to hear the case but rather to vacate the ruling below and remand it to court of appeals "in light of" Raich. The Ninth Circuit was thereby directed to reconsider Stewart and be guided in that reconsideration by Raich. Raich holds that Congress can use the Commerce Clause to ban homegrown marijuana due to its potential to affect the supply and demand in the interstate market.

== Circuit Court reversal ==
The Ninth Circuit reconsidered the case as directed and on June 30, 2006, reversed its decision and found in favor of the United States. In its opinion, the court wrote:

- "We therefore hold that Congress had a rational basis for concluding that in the aggregate, possession of homemade machine guns could substantially affect interstate commerce in machine guns."
