= Gun-Free School Zones Act of 1990 =

United States law limiting firearms near schools

Crime Control Act of 1990
- Other short titles: Anabolic Steroids Control Act of 1990; Child Protection Restoration and Penalties Enhancement Act of 1990; Comprehensive Thrift and Bank Fraud Prosecution and Taxpayer Recovery Act of 1990; Criminal Victims Protection Act of 1990; Federal Debt Collection Procedures Act of 1990; Financial Institutions Anti-Fraud Enforcement Act of 1990; Mandatory Detention for Offenders Convicted of Serious Crimes Act; National Child Search Assistance Act of 1990; National Law Enforcement Cooperation Act of 1990; Victims of Child Abuse Act of 1990; Victims' Rights and Restitution Act of 1990
- Long title: Gun-Free School Zones Act of 1990
- Acronyms (colloquial): GFSZA, CCA
- Nicknames: Gun-Free School Zones Act of 1990
- Enacted by: the 101st United States Congress
- Effective: November 29, 1990

Citations
- Public law: 101-647
- Statutes at Large: 104 Stat. 4789 aka 104 Stat. 4844

Codification
- Titles amended: 18 U.S.C.: Crimes and Criminal Procedure
- U.S.C. sections amended: 18 U.S.C. ch. 44 § 921 et seq.; 18 U.S.C. ch. 44 § 922 et seq.

Legislative history
- Introduced in the Senate as S.3266 by Herb Kohl (D-WI) on October 27, 1990; Passed the Senate on October 27, 1990 (passed voice vote); Passed the House of Representatives on October 27, 1990 (313–1, Roll call vote 534, via Clerk.House.gov); Signed into law by President George H. W. Bush on November 29, 1990

United States Supreme Court cases
- United States v. Lopez

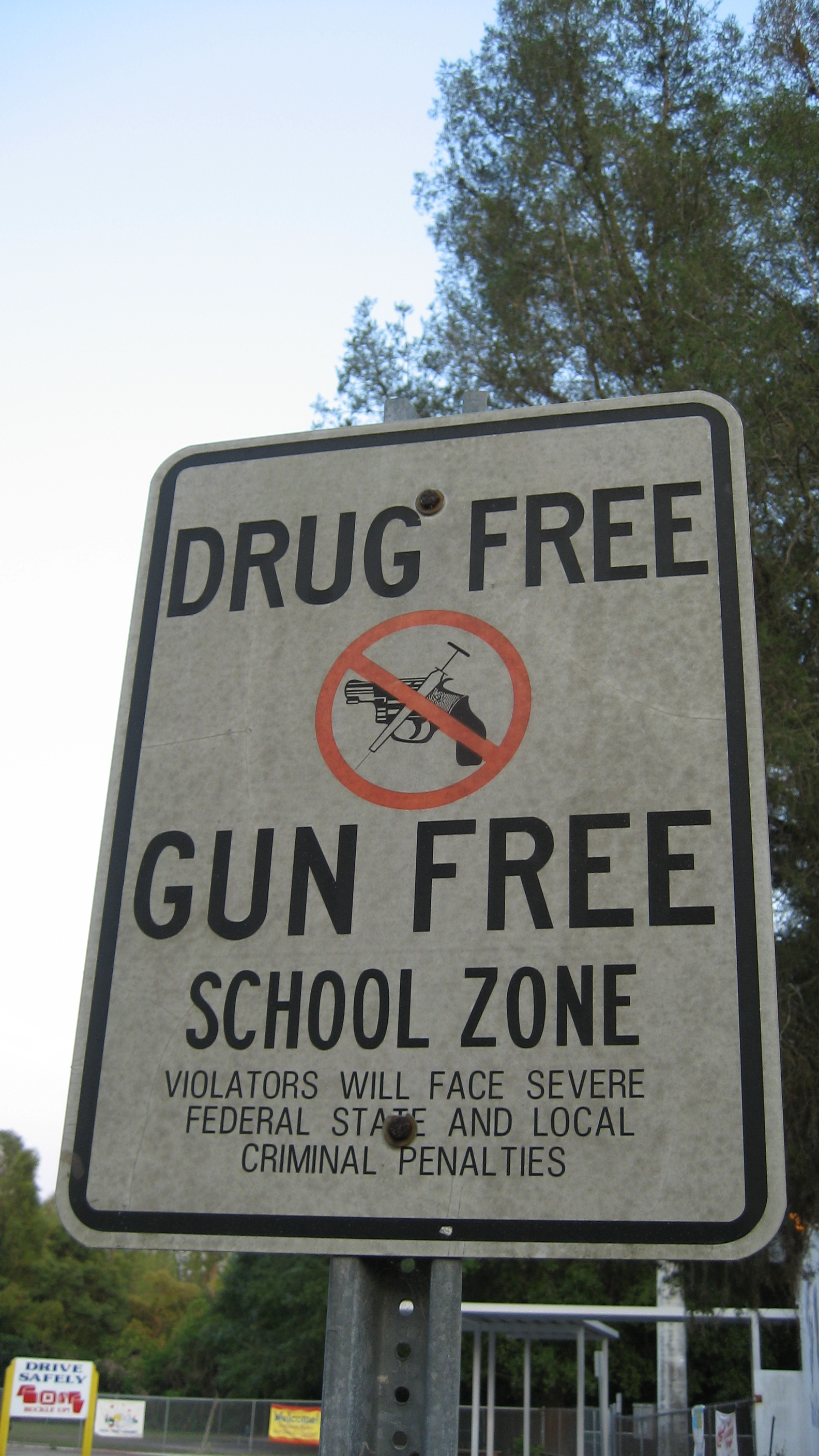
Section 1702(b)(5) of Pub. L. 101-647 states: "Federal, State, and local authorities are encouraged to cause signs to be posted around school zones giving warning of prohibition of the possession of firearms in a school zone."

ATF letter detailing the agency's interpretation of the act

The Gun-Free School Zones Act (GFSZA) is an act of the U.S. Congress prohibiting any unauthorized individual from knowingly possessing a loaded or unsecured firearm at a place that the individual knows, or has reasonable cause to believe, is a school zone as defined by 18 U.S.C. § 921(a)(26). The law applies to public, private, and parochial elementary schools and high schools, and to non-private property within 1,000 feet (300 m) of them. It provides that the states and their political subdivisions may issue licenses that exempt the licensed individuals from the prohibition.

It was first introduced in the U.S. Senate in February 1990 as S. 2070 by Senator Herb Kohl of Wisconsin and then was incorporated into the Crime Control Act of 1990 that was signed into law by President George H. W. Bush.

== History ==
The Gun-Free School Zones Act of 1990 was originally passed as section 1702 of the Crime Control Act of 1990. It added 18 U.S.C. § 922(q); 18 U.S.C. § 922 itself was added by the Omnibus Crime Control and Safe Streets Act of 1968.

The Supreme Court of the United States subsequently held that the Act was an unconstitutional exercise of Congressional authority under the Commerce Clause of the United States Constitution in United States v. Lopez, 514 U.S. 549 (1995). This was the first time in over half a century that the Supreme Court limited Congressional authority to legislate under the Commerce Clause.

Following the Lopez decision, U.S. Attorney General Janet Reno proposed changes to 18 U.S.C. § 922(q) that were adopted in section 657 of the Omnibus Consolidated Appropriations Act of 1997, Pub. L. 104–208 (text) (PDF), 110 Stat. 3009, enacted September 30, 1996. These changes required that the firearm in question "has moved in or otherwise affects interstate commerce." As nearly all firearms have moved in interstate commerce at some point in their existence, critics assert this was merely a legislative tactic to circumvent the Supreme Court's ruling.

== Challenges ==
The Supreme Court of the United States held that the original act was an unconstitutional exercise of Congressional authority under the Commerce Clause of the United States Constitution in United States v. Lopez, 514 U.S. 549 (1995). This was the first time in over half a century that the Supreme Court limited Congressional authority to legislate under the Commerce Clause.

Although the amended GFSZA has yet to be challenged in the U.S. Supreme Court, it has been reviewed and upheld by several federal Circuit Courts. In a 2005 appellate case, United States v. Dorsey, the minor changes of the revised law were specifically challenged. In Dorsey, the U.S. Court of Appeals for the Ninth Circuit ruled that the minor changes were indeed sufficient to correct the issues that had caused the original 1990 law to be struck down in Lopez, and they upheld Dorsey's conviction under the revised version of the law. A 2000 ruling made by the Eleventh Circuit in United States v. Tait overturned a conviction for firearm possession in a school zone because the defendant was licensed to do so by the state in which the school zone is located.

Convictions upheld post-Lopez under the revised Gun Free School Zones Act include:

- United States v. Danks (Eighth Circuit 1999)
- United States v. Smith (Sixth Circuit 2005)
- United States v. Dorsey (Ninth Circuit 2005)
- United States v. Nieves-Castaño (First Circuit 2007)
- United States v. Weekes (Third Circuit 2007)
- United States v. Benally (Tenth Circuit 2007)
- United States v. Cruz-Rodriguez (First Circuit 2008)

Convictions overturned post-Lopez under the revised Gun Free School Zones Act include:

- United States v. Tait (Eleventh Circuit 2000)
- United States v. Haywood (Third Circuit 2002)
- United States v. Guzman-Montanez (First Circuit 2014)

== Provisions ==
18 U.S.C. § 922(q)(2)(A) states:

It shall be unlawful for any individual knowingly to possess a firearm that has moved in or that otherwise affects interstate or foreign commerce at a place that the individual knows, or has reasonable cause to believe, is a school zone.

18 U.S.C. § 922(q)(3)(A) states:

Except as provided in subparagraph (B), it shall be unlawful for any person, knowingly or with reckless disregard for the safety of another, to discharge or attempt to discharge a firearm that has moved in or that otherwise affects interstate or foreign commerce at a place that the person knows is a school zone.

=== Exceptions ===
Pursuant to 18 U.S.C. § 922(q)(2)(B):

[18 U.S.C. § 922(q)(2)(A)] does not apply to the possession of a firearm—

(i) on private property not part of school grounds;

(ii) if the individual possessing the firearm is licensed to do so by the State in which the school zone is located or a political subdivision of the State, and the law of the State or political subdivision requires that, before an individual obtains such a license, the law enforcement authorities of the State or political subdivision verify that the individual is qualified under law to receive the license;

(iii) that is—

(I) not loaded; and

(II) in a locked container, or a locked firearms rack that is on a motor vehicle;

(iv) by an individual for use in a program approved by a school in the school zone;

(v) by an individual in accordance with a contract entered into between a school in the school zone and the individual or an employer of the individual;

(vi) by a law enforcement officer acting in his or her official capacity; or

(vii) that is unloaded and is possessed by an individual while traversing school premises for the purpose of gaining access to public or private lands open to hunting, if the entry on school premises is authorized by school authorities.

Pursuant to 18 U.S.C. § 922(q)(3)(B):

[18 U.S.C. § 922(q)(3)(A)] does not apply to the discharge of a firearm—

(i) on private property not part of school grounds;

(ii) as part of a program approved by a school in the school zone, by an individual who is participating in the program;

(iii) by an individual in accordance with a contract entered into between a school in a school zone and the individual or an employer of the individual; or

(iv) by a law enforcement officer acting in his or her official capacity.

=== Definitions ===
Pursuant to 18 U.S.C. § 921(a)(25):

The term "school zone" means—

(A) in, or on the grounds of, a public, parochial or private school; or

(B) within a distance of 1,000 feet from the grounds of a public, parochial or private school.

Pursuant to 18 U.S.C. § 921(a)(26) the term "school" means a school which provides elementary or secondary education, as determined under state law.

=== Penalty ===
18 U.S.C. § 924(a)(4) establishes the penalty for violating GFSZA:

Whoever violates the Act shall be fined not more than $5,000, imprisoned for not more than 5 years, or both. Notwithstanding any other provision of law, the term of imprisonment imposed under this paragraph shall not run concurrently with any other term of imprisonment imposed under any other provision of law.

A conviction under the GFSZA will cause an individual to become a "prohibited person" under the Gun Control Act of 1968. It is unlawful for a "prohibited person" to own, purchase, or possess "firearms" as defined by US federal law. A US presidential pardon may remove this civil disability.

== Legal effects ==
=== Places affected ===
Individuals traveling on public sidewalks, roads, and highways within 1,000 feet (300 m) of defined schools are subject to the law's legal restrictions. The First Circuit Court of Appeals sustained a GFSZA conviction in the 2007 case of United States v Nieves-Castaño for a firearm kept in a woman's apartment, which was part of a public housing project within 1,000 feet of a school. In 2012, ATF informed the town of Stratham, New Hampshire that hunters would be violating GFSZA by hunting on locally approved public hunting land, a town forest, which fell within 1,000 feet of a local school.

=== Carrying ===
Most states allow some form of unlicensed carry by persons who are not prohibited by statute from owning or possessing firearms. This may be open-carry, vehicle-carry, or concealed carry without the need for a permit. The Federal GFSZA prohibits unlicensed carry by making it a federal crime for an unlicensed individual to travel into a "Gun Free School Zone unless they meet one of the other criteria defined in Section 'B'." The large number of K-12 schools in developed areas makes it difficult for an individual to travel any distance without entering a Gun Free School Zone.

Although the federal GFSZA does provide an exception for an individual licensed to carry a firearm, this exception only applies in the state that physically issued the permit. Nearly all 50 states have provisions to issue concealed carry permits to citizens. Most of these states also enter into reciprocity agreements with other states where each state agrees to recognize the other's concealed carry permits. Because the Federal GFSZA requires the permit be issued by the state which the school zone is in, it is difficult for a permit holder to travel outside their state of issuance to a reciprocating state without violating the Federal GFSZA.

The Law Enforcement Officers Safety Act (LEOSA), intended to allow qualified law enforcement officers the ability to carry guns nationwide, does not provide any exceptions to Federal Law per 18 U.S.C. § 926B. GFSZA does not make any exception for an off-duty qualified officer.

=== Discharge ===
GFSZA generally prohibits anyone from discharging a firearm on public property within a school zone. Legal exceptions are made for on-duty law enforcement and contracted school security.

== Reactions ==
=== Amendments introduced ===
In June 1995, following restrictions which were placed on the original law in the United States v. Lopez Supreme Court ruling, the Gun-Free School Zones Act of 1995 was introduced. The new bill would have restored much of the language of the original law, but also add a new provision which requires prosecutors to prove during each prosecution that the gun moved in or affected interstate or foreign commerce.

==== Opposing the law ====
On May 22, 2007, June 24, 2009, and July 21, 2011, US Representative Ron Paul introduced similar bills H.R. 2424, H.R. 3021, and H.R. 2613 that would repeal the Federal Gun Free School Zones Act.

On January 3, 2013 Thomas Massie introduced a bill, H.R. 133, a similar one to Ron Paul's introductions. Since then every congress he has proposed a similar bill, with H.R. 86 on Jan 6, 2015; H.R. 34 on Jan 3, 2017; H.R. 3200 on June 11, 2019; H.R. 7415 on April 6, 2022; H.R. 2052 on April 6, 2023; and most recently, H.R. 5066 on Aug 29, 2025. All of these bills have had the same official title of “To repeal the Gun-Free School Zones Act of 1990 and amendments to that Act” with similar shorthand titles. The text of each respective bill has been nearly identical since the first bill of this kind, H.R. 2424, was introduced. No form of any of these bills has ever passed committee.

== See also ==
- Gun law in the United States
- Gun politics in the United States
