= United States v. Morrison =

- Supreme Court of the United States

Argued January 11, 2000 Decided May 15, 2000
- Full case name: United States v. Antonio J. Morrison et al. and Christy Brzonkala v. Antonio J. Morrison et al.
- Docket nos.: 99-5; 99-29
- Citations: 529 U.S. 598 (more) 120 S. Ct. 1740; 146 L. Ed. 2d 658; 2000 U.S. LEXIS 3422; 68 U.S.L.W. 4351; 82 Fair Empl. Prac. Cas. (Daily Journal DAR 5061; 2000 Colo. J. C.A.R. 2583; 13 Fla. L. Weekly Fed. S 287
- Argument: Oral argument

Case history
- Prior: Brzonkala v. Va. Polytechnic Inst. & State Univ., 935 F. Supp. 779 (W.D. Va. 1996), aff'd, 169 F.3d 820

Holding
- Congress did not regulate an activity that substantially affected interstate commerce. The Commerce Clause thus did not permit the enactment of the Act. The Fourteenth Amendment was not applicable since no state was responsible for causing the alleged harm.

Court membership
- Chief Justice William Rehnquist Associate Justices John P. Stevens · Sandra Day O'Connor; Antonin Scalia · Anthony Kennedy; David Souter · Clarence Thomas; Ruth Bader Ginsburg · Stephen Breyer

Case opinions
- Majority: Rehnquist, joined by O'Connor, Scalia, Kennedy, Thomas
- Concurrence: Thomas
- Dissent: Souter, joined by Stevens, Ginsburg, Breyer
- Dissent: Breyer, joined by Stevens; Souter, Ginsburg (Part I-A)

Laws applied
- U.S. Const. Art. I, § 8, cl. 3; U.S. Const. Amend. XIV; 42 U.S.C. § 13981

United States v. Morrison, 529 U.S. 598 (2000), is a U.S. Supreme Court decision that found unconstitutional parts of the Violence Against Women Act of 1994 for exceeding powers granted to the US Congress under the Commerce Clause and the Fourteenth Amendment's Equal Protection Clause. Along with United States v. Lopez (1995), it was part of a series of Rehnquist Court cases that limited Congress's powers under the Commerce Clause.

The case arose from a challenge to a provision of the Violence Against Women Act that provided victims of gender-motivated violence the right to sue their attackers in federal court. In a majority opinion joined by four other justices, Chief Justice William Rehnquist held that the Commerce Clause gave Congress only the power to regulate activities that were directly economic in nature, even if there were indirect economic consequences. Rehnquist also held that the Equal Protection Clause did not authorize the law because the clause applies only to acts by states, not to acts by private individuals.

In his dissenting opinion, Associate Justice David Souter argued that the majority revived an old and discredited interpretation of the Commerce Clause.

== Background ==
In 1994, the United States Congress passed the Violence Against Women Act, which contained a provision at 42 U.S.C. § 13981 for a federal civil remedy to victims of gender-based violence even if no criminal charges had been filed against the alleged perpetrator of that violence.

That fall, at Virginia Tech, freshman student, Christy Brzonkala, alleged that she was assaulted and raped repeatedly by students Antonio Morrison and James Crawford. Brzonkala initially stated that she visited Morrison and Crawford in their dormitory and they assaulted her, but later claimed that she was assaulted in her dormitory, and had never met the students until that day. During the school-conducted hearing on her complaint, Morrison admitted having sexual contact with her, but claimed that it was consensual. College proceedings failed to punish Crawford who produced an alibi witness, but initially punished Morrison with a suspension (which was later struck down by the administration). A state grand jury did not find sufficient evidence to charge either man with a crime. Brzonkala then filed suit under the Violence Against Women Act.

The United States District Court for the Western District of Virginia held that Congress lacked authority to enact 42 U.S.C. § 13981. A three-judge panel of the Court of Appeals for the Fourth Circuit reversed the decision 2–1. The Fourth Circuit reheard the case en banc and reversed the panel, upholding the district court.

== Ruling ==
The Court's 5–4 decision invalidated the section of the Violence Against Women Act (VAWA) of 1994 that gave victims of gender-motivated violence the right to sue their attackers in federal court. Chief Justice Rehnquist, writing for the majority, held that Congress lacked authority, under either the Commerce Clause or the Fourteenth Amendment, to enact that provision.

However, the Act's program funding remained unaffected.

== Majority opinion ==
The majority opinion held that the challenged section of VAWA exceeded congressional power under the Commerce Clause and the Equal Protection Clause.

=== Commerce Clause ===
With regard to the Commerce Clause, the majority said that the result was controlled by United States v. Lopez (1995), which had held that the Gun-Free School Zones Act of 1990 was unconstitutional. As in Morrison, the Court had stressed "enumerated powers" that limit federal power to maintain "a distinction between what is truly national and what is truly local." Therefore, Lopez limited the scope of the Commerce Clause to exclude activity that was not directly economic in nature, even if there were indirect economic consequences. Lopez was the first significant limitation on the Commerce Clause powers of Congress in 53 years. The Lopez court stated that Congress may regulate the use of the channels of interstate commerce, the "instrumentalities" (such as vehicles) used in interstate commerce, and activities that substantially affect interstate commerce. Because VAWA's civil remedy concededly did not regulate the first or second categories, the Court analyzed its validity under the third in Morrison.

The majority concluded that acts of violence that were meant to be remedied by VAWA had only an "attenuated," not a substantial, effect on interstate commerce. The government, however, argued that "a mountain of evidence" indicated that such acts in the aggregate had a substantial effect. For that proposition the government relied on Wickard v. Filburn (1942), which held that Congress could regulate an individual act that lacked a substantial effect on interstate commerce if, when aggregated, such acts had the required relation to interstate commerce. Once again, relying on Lopez, the majority replied that the aggregation principle of Wickard did not apply because economic effects of crimes against women were indirect and so they could not be addressed through the Commerce Clause.

The Court explained that the need to distinguish between economic activities that directly and those that indirectly affect interstate commerce was caused by "the concern that we expressed in Lopez that Congress might use the Commerce Clause to completely obliterate the Constitution's distinction between national and local authority." Referring to Lopez, the Court stated, "Were the Federal Government to take over the regulation of entire areas of traditional State concern, areas having nothing to do with the regulation of commercial activities, the boundaries between the spheres of federal and State authority would blur." The majority further stated that "it is difficult to perceive any limitation on federal power, even in areas such as criminal law enforcement or education where States historically have been sovereign."

Justice Thomas's concurring opinion also expressed the concern that "Congress [was] appropriating State police powers under the guise of regulating commerce."

The majority, quoting from NLRB v. Jones & Laughlin Steel Corp. (1937), stated that the scope of the interstate commerce power

must be considered in the light of our dual system of government and may not be extended so as to embrace effects upon interstate commerce so indirect and remote that to embrace them, in view of our complex society, would effectually obliterate the distinction between what is national and what is local and create a completely centralized government.

=== Equal Protection Clause ===
The Court also held that Congress lacked the power to enact VAWA under the Fourteenth Amendment. It relied on the "state action" doctrine, which originated in United States v. Harris (1883) and the Civil Rights Cases (1883), and provides that the prohibitions of the Fourteenth Amendment do not constrain private individuals.

The U.S. government argued that VAWA appropriately enforced the Equal Protection Clause's ban on governmental gender discrimination. Specially, the government argued that pervasive gender stereotypes and assumptions permeated state justice systems and that such forms of state bias led to "insufficient investigation and prosecution of gender-motivated crime, inappropriate focus on the behavior and credibility of the victims of that crime, and unacceptably lenient punishments for those who are actually convicted of gender-motivated violence." That bias, the government argued, deprived women of the equal protection of the laws, and the private civil remedy of VAWA was meant to redress "both the States' bias and deter future instances of gender discrimination in the state courts."

The Court responded that even if there had been gender-based disparate treatment by state authorities in that case, precedents such as the Civil Rights Cases limit the manner in which Congress may remedy discrimination, and they require a civil remedy to be directed at a state or a state actor, not a private party. The Court stated that such precedents prohibit only action by state governments, not private conduct. In other words, the unequal enforcement of state laws caused by inaction is, by that interpretation, beyond the scope of the federal government's enforcement of the Equal Protection Clause.

The majority reaffirmed the state action doctrine and specifically reaffirmed the results reached in United States v. Harris (1883) and the Civil Rights Cases (1883), both of which were decided 15 years after the Fourteenth Amendment's ratification in 1868. In the Civil Rights Cases, the Court had held that the Equal Protection Clause applied only to acts done by states, not to acts done by private individuals. Because the Civil Rights Act of 1875 applied to racial discrimination in private establishments, the Court decided in the Civil Rights Cases, it exceeded congressional enforcement power under section 5 of the Fourteenth Amendment. In Harris, the Court ruled that the Clause did not apply to a prison lynching since the Fourteenth Amendment did not apply to private actors, only state actors. In that case, a sheriff, a state actor, had tried to prevent the lynching.

Morrison stated that "assuming that there has been gender-based disparate treatment by state authorities in this case, it would not be enough to save § 13981's civil remedy, which is directed not at a State or state actor but at individuals who have committed criminal acts motivated by gender bias." The Court agreed with the government that there was a "voluminous congressional record" supporting the "assertion that there is pervasive bias in various state justice systems against victims of gender-motivated violence." The Court also agreed with the government that "state-sponsored gender discrimination violates equal protection unless it serves important governmental objectives...." However, according to the majority, even if there is unconstitutional state action, Congress is justified in targeting only state actors, rather than private parties.

The government's argument was that VAWA had been enacted in response to "gender-based disparate treatment by state authorities." In contrast there was "no indication of such state action" in the Civil Rights Cases. According to the Court, however, the Civil Rights Cases held that the Fourteenth Amendment did not allow Congress to target private parties to remedy the unequal enforcement of state laws. To support that interpretation of the Civil Rights Cases, the Court quoted one of the Congressmen who had supported the law that the Civil Rights Cases struck down: "There were state laws on the books bespeaking equality of treatment, but in the administration of these laws there was discrimination against newly freed slaves." To the majority, that quote indicated that the law deemed unconstitutional in the Civil Rights Cases was meant to combat the same kind of disparate treatment against which VAWA was aimed.

The majority continued that even if the government's distinction between Morrison and the Civil Rights Cases was valid, the VAWA remained unconstitutionally aimed not at state actors but at private criminal conduct. Under City of Boerne v. Flores (1997), the majority stated, Congress was required to adhere to the Court's interpretation of the Fourteenth Amendment, including the Court's interpretation of the state-action doctrine. The "congruence and proportionality" requirement of Boerne did not allow Congress to exceed the Court's interpretation of the Fourteenth Amendment. Although it had been widely believed that Section Five of the Fourteenth Amendment was a "one-way ratchet" and a minimum standard, the Court's interpretation of the Equal Protection Clause, that interpretation had been rejected by the Court in Boerne to prevent what the Court described as "a considerable congressional intrusion into the States' traditional prerogatives and general authority."

The belief that section five was a "one-way ratchet" had been based on Katzenbach v. Morgan, 384 U.S. 641 (1966), in which the Court had called that Section Five of the Fourteenth Amendment "a positive grant of legislative power authorizing Congress to exercise its discretion in determining the need for and nature of legislation to secure Fourteenth Amendment guarantees." In Morrison, the Court, as it had in Boerne, again distinguished Morgan on the ground that Morgan had involved federal legislation "directed at New York officials," instead of private parties. The Court also noted that unlike the VAWA, the legislation in Morgan "was directed only to the State where the evil found by Congress existed."

== Dissenting opinions ==
Justice Souter, joined by Justices Stevens, Ginsburg, and Breyer, argued that enacting VAWA was well within Congress's power under the Commerce Clause and stated that the majority revived an old and discredited interpretation of the Commerce Clause. He ended with a pointed note regarding the fact that the states that would nominally benefit from Congress' power being returned to them in fact overwhelmingly supported the law, and stated that "it is, then, not the least irony of these cases that the States will be forced to enjoy the new federalism whether they want it or not."

Justice Breyer, joined by Justices Stevens, Souter, and Ginsburg, argued that it was primarily the responsibility of Congress, not the courts, to put limits on Congress's power under the Commerce Clause. According to the four dissenting justices, the Fourteenth Amendment and the Seventeenth Amendment "are not rips in the fabric of the Framers' Constitution, inviting judicial repairs," and amendments affecting states' rights like the Seventeenth Amendment "did not convert the judiciary into an alternate shield against the commerce power." In a part joined only by Justice Stevens, Justice Breyer contended that Congress had been sensitive to concerns of federalism in enacting VAWA, and he expressed doubts about the majority's pronouncements on the Fourteenth Amendment.

== Reactions ==
Morrison, like Boerne, Kimel, and Garrett, was one of a series of Rehnquist Court decisions from 1997 through 2001 holding that Congress's enumerated powers do not permit various federal civil rights laws. Morrison was also seen by the press as one of the Rehnquist Court's series of federalism decisions, mainly because of the Court's previous decisions in Lopez and other cases.

The Washington Post argued in favor of Morrison: "The court got it right. If Congress could federalize rape and assault, it's hard to think of anything it couldn't." The lawyer and writer Wendy Kaminer agreed with the Court that Congress had overstepped its bounds by invoking the Commerce Clause: "The price of upholding VAWA's civil rights remedy is an unconstitutional grant of unlimited power to Congress, power that will not always be used wisely or with regard to individual rights. We need to combat sexual violence without making a federal case of it."

Professor Catharine MacKinnon criticized Morrison for relying on "implicitly patriarchal" legal reasoning. She argued that the decision reflected an attitude, pervasive in the American judicial system, of violence against women being a "domestic" issue and therefore less serious than "male issues." Professor Peter M. Shane said that the attorneys general of 36 states had endorsed the VAWA, and he argued that the endorsement "exposes one of the more bizarre aspects of the Supreme Court's recent activism on behalf of state sovereignty: From the states' point of view, this campaign is often pointless and sometimes counterproductive." Shane stated that the 36 attorneys general had called the Violence Against Women Act "a particularly appropriate remedy for the harm caused by gender-motivated violence." This accorded with the portion of Justice Souter's dissenting opinion to the effect that the states broadly felt it appropriate for Congress to be the body to deal with that particular issue and that it was therefore backwards to impose a conflicting interpretation on them.

== See also ==
- Aggregate effects doctrine
- Rehnquist Court
- Congressional power of enforcement
- List of United States Supreme Court cases, volume 529
- List of United States Supreme Court cases
- Lists of United States Supreme Court cases by volume
