= Bob Jones University v. Simon =

- Supreme Court of the United States

Argued January 7, 1974 Decided May 15, 1974
- Full case name: Bob Jones University v. Simon, Secretary of the Treasury, et al.
- Citations: 416 U.S. 725 (more) 94 S. Ct. 2038; 40 L. Ed. 2d 496
- Argument: Oral argument
- Opinion announcement: Opinion announcement

Case history
- Prior: Preliminary injunction granted, Bob Jones University v. Connally, 341 F. Supp. 277 (D.S.C. 1971); reversed, 472 F.2d 903, rehearing denied, 476 F.2d 259 (4th Cir. 1973).
- Subsequent: Bob Jones University v. United States, 461 U.S. 574 (1983).

Holding
- The Court held that Bob Jones University could not seek an injunction preventing the IRS from revoking its 501(c)(3) tax-exempt status, as the court was barred from issuing an injunction "for the purpose of restraining the assessment or collection of any tax" under the Anti-Injunction Act.

Court membership
- Chief Justice Warren E. Burger Associate Justices William O. Douglas · William J. Brennan Jr. Potter Stewart · Byron White; Thurgood Marshall · Harry Blackmun; Lewis F. Powell Jr. · William Rehnquist

Case opinions
- Majority: Powell, joined by Burger, Brennan, Stewart, White, Marshall, Rehnquist
- Concurrence: Blackmun (in result)
- Douglas took no part in the consideration or decision of the case.

Laws applied
- Anti-Injunction Act

Bob Jones University v. Simon, 416 U.S. 725 (1974), is a decision made by the Supreme Court of the United States holding that Bob Jones University, which had its 501(c)(3) status revoked by the Internal Revenue Service for practicing "racially discriminatory admissions policies" towards African Americans, could not sue for an injunction to prevent losing its tax-exempt status. The question of Bob Jones University's tax-exempt status was ultimately resolved in Bob Jones University v. United States, in which the court ruled that the First Amendment did not protect discriminatory organizations from losing tax-exempt status.

== Background ==
Bob Jones University is devoted to the teaching of fundamentalist religious beliefs, one of which is that God intended that people of different races live separately and not intermarry. When the university was founded in 1927, it denied admission to black students. The school began allowing unmarried blacks to enroll in 1975, but it forbade interracial dating or marriage.

Until 1970, the Internal Revenue Service (IRS) granted tax-exempt status to all private schools, regardless of their admissions policies. Section 501(c)(3) of the Internal Revenue Code of 1954 lists organizations that qualify for tax-exempt status and includes those which are charitable, religious, or for educational purposes. But a rise in the prevalence of Christian private schools in the 1960s and the Civil Rights Act of 1964 led the IRS to re-evaluate its policy. The IRS announced in 1970 that private schools with racially discriminatory admissions policies would no longer receive tax exemptions. The IRS then notified Bob Jones University of its intention to revoke the university's tax-exempt status because of the university's racially discriminatory admissions policy. As a result, the university would be subject to taxation and its donors would not be able to claim their gifts to the school as charitable deductions.

Bob Jones University filed suit to block the IRS from revoking its tax-exempt status, alleging "irreparable injury in the form of substantial federal income tax liability." In 1971, the United States District Court for the District of South Carolina granted a preliminary injunction, but in 1973 the United States Court of Appeals for the Fourth Circuit reversed that decision. The Court of Appeals relied on the Anti-Injunction Act, which states that "no suit for the purpose of restraining the assessment or collection of any tax shall be maintained in any court." A party cannot stop the government from collecting taxes. Instead, in order to protect the Government's need to assess and collect taxes efficiently, the proper procedure is for the party to pay the disputed tax and then file an action for refund.

The Supreme Court granted a petition for certiorari to determine whether the Anti-Injunction Act barred Bob Jones University's suit to enjoin the IRS from revoking its tax-exempt status.

== Before the Supreme Court ==
The case of Bob Jones University v. Simon was presided over by Chief Justice Warren Burger and Associate Justices William O. Douglas, William J. Brennan, Jr., Potter Stewart, Byron R. White, Thurgood Marshall, Harry A. Blackmun, Lewis F. Powell, Jr., and William H. Rehnquist.

Arguing on behalf of Bob Jones University was John D. "J.D." Todd Jr., a lawyer from Greenville, South Carolina, who served on the South Carolina Bar Board of Governors. The United States Treasury was represented by Assistant Attorney General Scott P. Crampton, with Solicitor General Robert Bork accompanying on the brief.

Todd argued that Bob Jones University had met all the requirements of 501(c)(3) as set forth by Congress but had its 501(c)(3) status revoked by the IRS nonetheless. Inclusion on the list of tax-exempt organizations was essential to receive donations from foundations and individuals, and Bob Jones argued that removal from this list constituted irreparable harm to the university. Todd claimed that "the lower court held that the [IRS] Commissioner exceeded the statutory authority given him, that he has authority to promulgate regulations but not to change law, and that that's a matter for Congress to decide, and we of course contend that that's absolutely correct." He also argued that Bob Jones University was not seeking an injunction on the collection of taxes resulting from the loss of tax-exempt status, but rather sought only an injunction on the removal of the university from the IRS list of registered 501(c)(3)s. This argument suggested that the case "involved taxes only very remotely" and was therefore not covered by the Anti-Injunction Act, which would bar Federal Courts from preventing the collection of any taxes by the IRS. Lastly, Todd contended that revocation of tax-exempt status by the IRS was an attempt to regulate the admissions policies of private universities, and not an effort motivated by protecting tax revenue.

On behalf of the Treasury, Crampton argued that Bob Jones would owe $1.25 million in income taxes and saw their actions as "taxpayers trying to stop the assessment of tax."

== Supreme Court decision ==
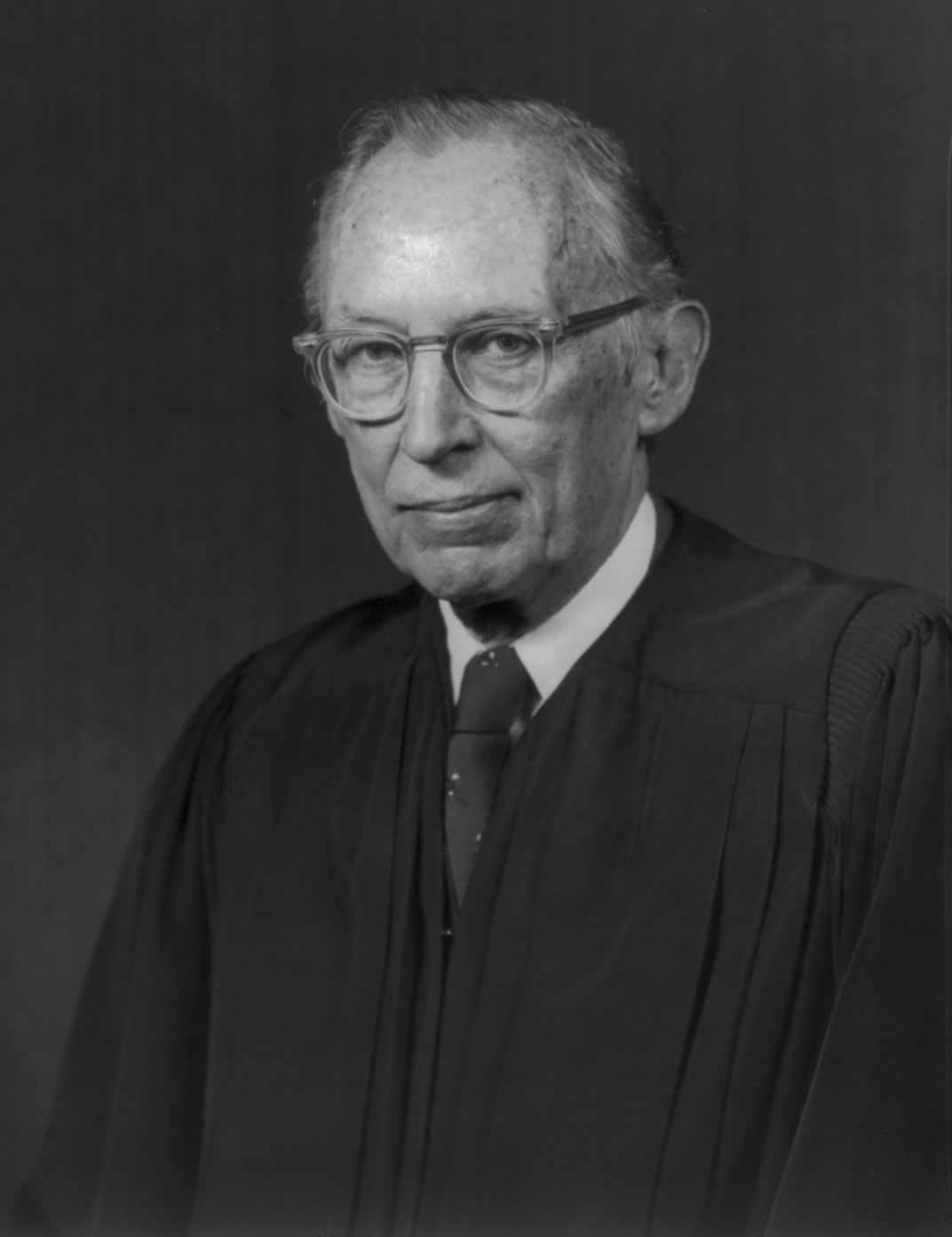
US Supreme Court Justice Lewis Powell - Wrote the opinion of this case

Bob Jones University v. Simon was decided May 15, 1974 in an 8–1 decision with majority opinion written by Lewis F. Powell, Jr., in which Justice Burger, Brennan, Stewart, White, Marshall, and Rehnquist joined. Justice Blackmun filed an opinion concurring in the result of the Court's decision. Justice Douglas took no part in the decision of this case. The Court held that the Anti-Injunction Act of the Internal Revenue Code, 26 USC § 7421(a), prohibited the university from obtaining judicial review by way of injunctive action. The Court further upheld that the Court of Appeals did not err in "holding that § 7421(a) deprived the District Court of jurisdiction to the issue of injunctive relief the petitioner sought." Lastly, the Court admits to recognizing the "harsh regime" in which § 7421(a) has placed on §501 (c)(3) organizations threatened with loss of tax-exempt status and withdrawal of advanced assurance of deductibility of contributions. But, the Court stated that "this matter is for Congress, which is the appropriate body to weigh the relevant, policy-laden considerations, such as the harshness of the present law."

Within Section I of the Court's opinion the Court sought to detail the provisions which outlined the requirements needed in order for an organization to be exempt from the taxes and receive tax-deductibles as stated in the Internal Revenue Code of 1954, specifically Section 501(c)(3).

Additionally under the Internal Revenue Code of 1954, for organizations that had their 501(c)(3) status revoked, a provision allowed for litigation concerning the legality of the IRS's action after the assessment and attempted collection of taxes. A legal suit could also be brought forward in a federal District Court or in the Court of Claims following the collection of any federal tax and the denial of a refund by the IRS.

The court made it explicit that the language of the Anti-Injunction Act mandates that "no suit for the purpose of restraining the assessment or collection of any tax shall be maintained in any court." Furthermore, the courts have interpreted the principle language of the act to serve as "the protection of the Government's need to assess and collect taxes as expeditiously as possible with a minimum of pre-enforcement judicial interference." Organizations seeking injunctive relief against the Service of the proposed action "conflict directly with a congressional prohibition of such pre-enforcement tax suits. In force continuously since its enactment in 1867.

It was held that:

1. operation of the Anti-Injunction Act could be avoided only if there was proof of both irreparable injury and certainty of success on the merits, a pre-enforcement injunction being permissible only if it was clear that under no circumstances could the government ultimately prevail;
2. the instant action was a suit "for the purpose of restraining the assessment or collection of any tax" under the Anti-Injunction Act, since (a) the plaintiff's allegations indicated that a primary purpose of the suit was to prevent the assessment and collection of income taxes from the plaintiff, (b) even if the plaintiff would owe no federal income taxes because of possible deductions for depreciation of plant and equipment, the plaintiff would still be liable for federal social security and unemployment taxes, which taxes were also contemplated by the Anti-Injunction Act, and (c) in any event, the plaintiff sought to restrain the collection of taxes from its donors by forcing the Internal Revenue Service to continue to provide advance assurance that contributions to the plaintiff would be tax-deductible, thereby reducing the donors' tax liability, which aspect was also covered by the Anti-Injunction Act even though the plaintiff sought to lower the taxes of persons other than itself;
3. the Anti-Injunction Act was not rendered inapplicable on the ground that the Service's actions constituted an attempt to regulate the admissions policies of private universities rather than an effort to protect the government's tax revenues, since there was no showing that the Service's position did not represent a good-faith effort to enforce technical requirements of the tax laws;
4. application of the Anti- Injunction Act did not deny due process of law to the plaintiff because of any irreparable injury it would suffer pending resort to alternative procedures for review whereby the plaintiff could obtain Tax Court review of any assessment for income taxes or alternatively could institute a refund suit after payment of income, social security, or unemployment taxes, since such alternative procedures offered the plaintiff a full, even though delayed, opportunity to litigate the legality of the Service's actions;
5. the Anti-Injunction Act barred the instant action since the plaintiff's contentions as to violations of its constitutional rights were sufficiently debatable so as to foreclose the necessary determination that under no circumstances could the government ultimately prevail.

=== Concurring opinion ===
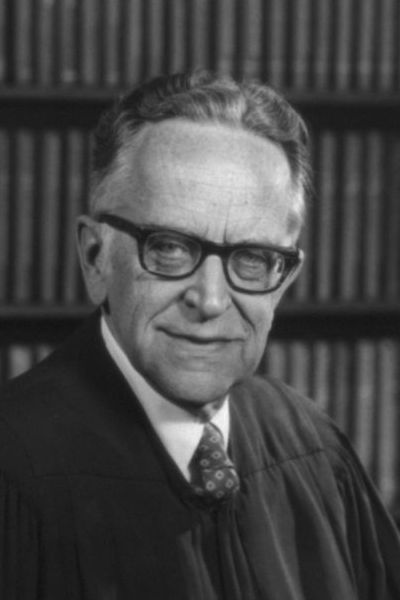
US Supreme Court Justice Harry Blackmun, concurred on the opinion of the Court

Justice Blackmun concurring on the result of the Court:

Justice Blackmun expressed the view that the purpose of the suit was to restrain "the assessment and collection" of a tax under the Anti-Injunction Act, since an injunction, if granted, would directly prevent the collection of income taxes from the plaintiff, and the action was barred since it had not been shown that under no circumstances could the government ultimately prevail.

== Impact/reception ==
Following the trial, the Internal Revenue Service clarified its anti-discrimination guidelines for public and church-operated private schools. In order to gain tax-exempt status, private schools were required to publicize their non-discrimination policies for selecting students and employees. Student loans and scholarships were to be allotted on a non-discriminatory basis. Schools must not only fulfill the requirements, but also report the racial composition of their student body and staff as well as how loans and scholarships were distributed. Although protected by the First Amendment to the United States Constitution, church-operated private schools cannot abstain from Federal public policies against racial discrimination if they are to receive tax-exempt status.

On January 19, 1976, the IRS revoked Bob Jones University's tax-exempt status. Subsequently, the university paid the Federal Unemployment Tax Act (FUTA) tax of $21 on one of its employees for that year in order to not come under the purview of the Anti-Injunction Act. After being denied a refund, the university proceeded to sue the IRS for revoking its tax-exempt status. The United States government filed for a counterclaim of $498,675.59 for unpaid federal unemployment taxes for the years 1971 to 1975.

At the time, the school had already begun changing its admission policy by extending admission to unmarried blacks (married black people had already been admitted in 1971). However, interracial dating and interracial marriage remained strictly prohibited by the university. The IRS refused to reinstate the university's tax-exempt status, arguing that the dating policies violated its nondiscriminatory requirements. The US District Court for the District of South Carolina ordered the IRS to restore the university's tax-exempt status on the grounds that the IRS policies violated the Free Exercise and Establishment Clause. In 1980, the Court of Appeals for the Fourth Circuit, in a split decision, determined that the dating policy, even if founded on religious conviction, violated its nondiscriminatory public policy. The request for a refund was dismissed and the government's counterclaim was reinstated. Bob Jones University proceeded to appeal the decision and the Supreme Court would determine the verdict in Bob Jones University v. United States.

== Role in subsequent decisions ==
Bob Jones University v. Simon has been cited in multiple cases in the Court of Appeals and Supreme Court since its 1974 ruling. The exceptions to the Anti-Injunction Act laid out in Bob Jones University v. Simon have been followed in several cases, notably in its "companion case" Alexander v. "Americans United" Inc. In Alexander, the Supreme Court considered the exemptions in determining that a non-profit organization's suit against the IRS based on constitutional claims would not continue under the Anti-Injunction Act. The rulings in Bob Jones University v. Simon and Alexander are considered a stricter reading of the Anti-Injunction Act for limiting the kinds of suits allowed to proceed before the enforcement of taxation by the IRS.

Bob Jones Univ. v. Simon has also been cited and distinguished in the decisions of other cases. In Security and Exchange Commission v. Credit Bancorp Ltd. as considered by the District Court for the Southern District of New York, the use of liens by the IRS were considered to be too different from the facts of Bob Jones University v. Simon for application of the earlier ruling without careful consideration. When the case came before the Second Circuit Court of Appeals, the exceptions put forth by Bob Jones Univ. v. Simon were used in part to determine the case.

More recently, Bob Jones Univ. v. Simon has been cited and considered in a suite of cases concerning the legislation of the Patient Protection and Affordable Care Act. In cases such as Commonwealth ex rel. Cuccinelli v. Sebelius and Halbig v. Sebelius, injunctions against the IRS in regards to tax policies related to the Affordable Care Act were not granted by the District Courts. In the lower court rulings of Thomas More Law Center v. Obama and Hobby Lobby Stores Inc. v. Sebelius, the Anti-Injunction Act was found to be not applicable in either case. In the Supreme Court case National Federation of Independent Business v. Sebelius, the Court requested arguments to be made concerning the Anti-Injunction Act and its possible application to the Affordable Care Act by an outside attorney, as neither the government nor the plaintiffs wished to argue its potential implications. In each of these cases the Anti-Injunction Act was not applied primarily due to the use of the term 'penalties' in the language of the Affordable Care Act, which the language of the Anti-Injunction Act does not explicitly cover.

=== Partial overruling and criticism ===
In the 1984 ruling of South Carolina v. Regan, Justice William Brennan delivered the Supreme Court's opinion detailing that the Anti-Injunction Act could not be used to prevent a legal suit if there did not exist a judicial process through which a plaintiff could make their case. This occurred due to the state of South Carolina lacking a direct method of challenging the removal of bearer bonds. The ruling therefore expanded on the instances in which the Anti-Injunction Act was not applicable, beyond the two exceptions set out by Bob Jones Univ. v. Simon and the earlier court case Enochs v. Williams Packing Co., and thus partially overruling Bob Jones Univ. v. Simon with the modifications to the use of the Anti-Injunction Act concerning future suits.

Several cases have also criticized the criteria for exemption as discussed in Bob Jones University v. Simon. In the dissenting opinion of Alexander v. "Americans United" Inc., Justice Harry Blackmun argued that the use of the Anti-Injunction Act to prevent suits based on constitutional arguments until after the IRS had acted disrupted the "system of checks and balances provided by judicial review."

Another such case is that of Kahn v. United States, in which the Third Circuit Court of Appeals considered the three criteria test provided by Mathews v. Eldridge to determine whether a lawsuit should be allowed to be litigated before policy enforcement by the IRS, even if a suit could be brought afterwards. The three criteria test is considered by some legal scholars to be valid in any case concerning the application of due process, including those of taxation.
