= Congressional Constitution Caucus =

- Chairman: None
- Founders: Scott Garrett; Virginia Foxx; Rob Bishop
- Founded: January 3, 2005
- Political position: Right-wing
- Seats in the Senate: 0 / 100
- Seats in the House: 26 / 435

Website
- Official Caucus Website

The Congressional Constitution Caucus is a congressional caucus made up of 41 members of the United States Congress. The caucus was founded in 2005; it had 37 members the first year it was founded.

The group was founded and formerly led by Republican U.S. Representative Scott Garrett of New Jersey, who sought to push the Republican Party leadership to move increasingly to the right.

== Electoral results ==
=== House of Representatives ===
Election year	Overall seats	Republican seats	±
2004	37 / 435	37 / 232	
2012	76 / 435	76 / 234	+39
2016	68 / 435	68 / 241	-8
2018	40 / 435	40 / 199	-28
2020	26 / 435	26 / 212	-14

== History ==
The Caucus was informally created by Representatives J. D. Hayworth, John Shadegg, Sam Brownback, Bob Barr, and Richard Pombo in the 104th Congress. According to the group, its purpose was to encourage constitutional debate in Congress and the nation and, in time, to restore constitutional government.

The Caucus was officially registered as a Congressional Member Organization in 2005 by Congressmen Scott Garrett, Virginia Foxx, and Rob Bishop. In a 2006 interview, the three described themselves as leading "...a team dedicated to downsizing the amount of power usurped from the states by the federal government."

In 2011, the group's membership grew rapidly following the entrance of new Tea Party-aligned members elected in the 2010 elections. In 2011, the Caucus and the Tea Party Caucus jointly sponsored a closed-door speech to the caucuses by Supreme Court Justice Antonin Scalia on the topic of "separation of powers."

At its peak in the 113th Congress, the Congressional Constitution Caucus had 76 members. However, the caucus possessed over 100 members when it existed informally in the 104th Congress.

== Ideology and political issues ==
The members of the Caucus are strongly opposed to the Affordable Care Act (ACA), and are outspoken opponents of the individual health mandate. The group has supported constitutional challenges to the ACA. In 2014, after the U.S. Court of Appeals for the District of Columbia rejected one such challenge in the case Sissel v. United States Department of Health & Human Services (ruling that the ACA did not violate the Origination Clause of the Constitution), the Caucus issued a statement saying "The judges got it wrong."

According to the founders of the Caucus, the main focus of the Caucus is to "ensure the federal government is operating under the intent of the 10th Amendment of our Bill of Rights." The Caucus has worked towards this goal through sponsoring legislation like H.R. 3449, H.R. 1227, and H.R. 1229.

== Membership ==
As of the 117th Congress, the Congressional Constitution Caucus has 41 members. 41 in the House, and 0 in the Senate. The current members of the Caucus are listed below, listed by state.

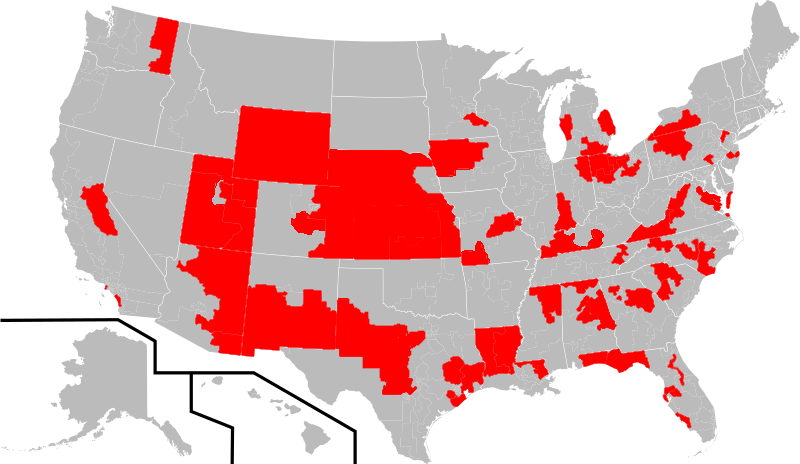
The Districts of Caucus Members (as of the 114th Congress) are highlighted in red. Please note: Only Districts within the House of Representatives are shown. Senate Districts are excluded.

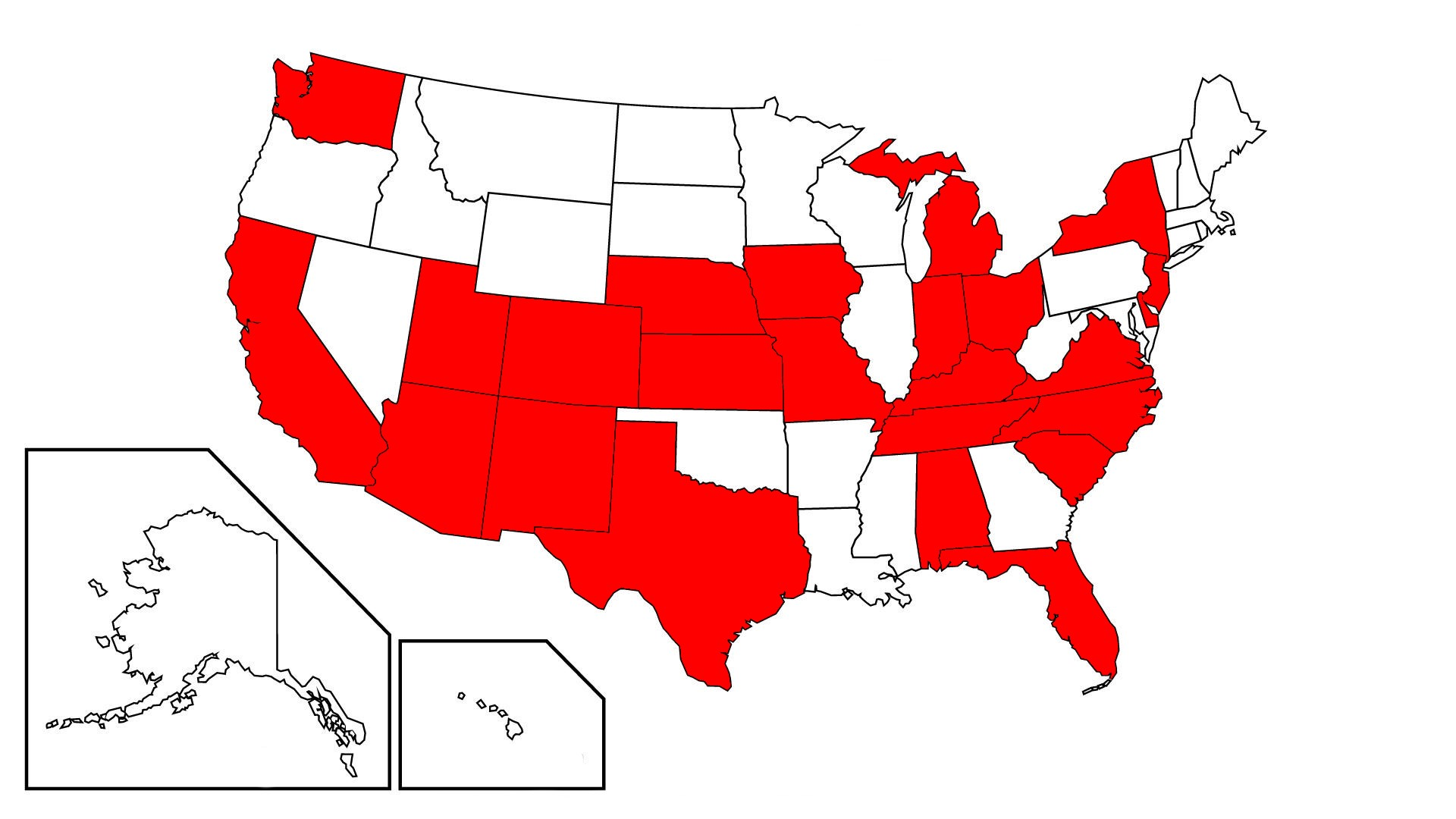
A map of Caucus member states as of the 115th Congress.

=== Leadership ===
- None

=== Current members ===
Alabama
- Rep. Mike Rogers (AL-3)
- Rep. Mo Brooks (AL-05)

Arizona

- Rep. Paul Gosar (AZ-04)

California

- Rep. Tom McClintock (CA-04)
- Rep. Darrell Issa (CA-50)

Colorado

- Rep. Doug Lamborn (CO-05)

Florida

- Rep. Bill Posey (FL-8)

Indiana

- Rep. Larry Bucshon (IN-08)

Kentucky

- Rep. Andy Barr (KY-06)

Missouri

- Rep. Ann Wagner (MO-02)
- Rep. Blaine Luetkemeyer (MO-03)
- Rep. Billy Long (MO-07)

Michigan

- Rep. Bill Huizenga (MI-02)
- Rep. Tim Walberg (MI-07)- Left the Caucus in 2009, but rejoined in 2011.

New York

- Rep. Tom Reed (NY-23)

Nebraska

- Adrian Smith (NE-3, Gering)

Ohio

- Rep. Jim Jordan (OH-04)
- Rep. Robert Latta (OH-05)
- Rep. Bob Gibbs (OH-7)

North Carolina

- Rep. Virginia Foxx (NC-05)

Pennsylvania

- Rep. Glenn Thompson (PA-15)

South Carolina

- Rep. Joe Wilson (SC-02)

Texas

- Rep. Kevin Brady (TX-08)

Utah

- Rep. Chris Stewart (UT-02)

Virginia

- Rep. Rob Wittman (VA-01)
- Rep. Morgan Griffith (VA-09)

Washington (state)

- Rep. Cathy McMorris Rodgers (WA-05)

Last updated: January 4, 2021

=== Former members ===
- Fmr. Rep. John Shadegg (AZ-03) - Chose not to run for reelection in 2010, saying he will "pursue [his] commitment to fight for freedom in a different venue."
- Fmr. Co-Chair Rep. Marlin Stutzman (IN-03) - Was defeated in the 2016 Republican primary for Indiana's Class 3 Senate seat.
- Fmr. Rep. Rodney Alexander (LA-05) - Was appointed to be Louisiana's Secretary of Veteran's Affairs.
- Fmr. Rep. Steve Southerland (FL-02) - Lost Re-election in 2014.
- Fmr. Rep. Spencer Bachus (AL-06) - Chose not to run for reelection in 2014.
- Fmr. Rep. Paul Broun (GA-10) - Lost the Republican Primary for Georgia's 10th congressional district.
- Fmr. Rep. John Campbell (CA-48) - Retired from Congress.
- Fmr. Rep. Renee Ellmers (NC-02) - Defeated in the 2016 Republican Primary.
- Fmr. Rep. John Fleming (LA-04) - Chose to run for Louisiana Senate. Nominated by Donald Trump to be the Deputy Assistant Secretary for Health Technology
- Fmr. Rep. Phil Gingrey (GA-11) - Ran for Georgia Senate in 2014.
- Fmr. Rep. Tim Huelskamp (KS-01) - Defeated in the 2016 Republican Primary.
- Fmr. Rep. David Jolly (Fl-13) - Vacated his seat to run for Florida Senate. Then dropped out of Senate race to rerun for House seat that he vacated, citing "unfinished business." Then was defeated in the 2016 general election.
- Fmr. Rep. Cynthia Lummis (WY) - Chose not to seek reelection in 2016. Later elected as a United States Senator from Wyoming.
- Fmr. Rep. Mike McIntyre (NC-07) - Retired from Congress.
- Fmr. Rep. Steve Stockman (TX-36) - Ran for the Texas Senate in 2014. Did not defend his Seat.
- Fmr. Rep. John Runyan (NJ-03) - Chose not to run for reelection in 2014, citing frustration with his fellow Republicans over the government shutdown. Was hired by the NFL to be their Vice President of the Policy and Rules Administration.
- Fmr. Rep. Scott Rigell (VA-02) - Retired from Congress.
- Fmr. Rep. Alan Nunnelee (MS-01) - Died in office after undergoing surgery for a brain tumor.
- Fmr. Rep. Curt Clawson (FL-19) - Chose not to run for reelection in 2016, citing the death of his mother as the main cause.
- Fmr. Rep. John Kline (MN-02) - Chose not to run for reelection in 2016.
- Fmr. Rep. Joe Pitts (PA-16) - Chose not to run for reelection in 2016.
- Fmr. Rep. Rich Nugent (FL-05) - Chose not to run for reelection in 2016.
- Fmr. Rep. Randy Neugebauer (TX-19) - Chose not to run for reelection in 2016.
- Fmr. Rep. Jeff Miller (FL-01) - Chose not to run for reelection in 2016.
- Fmr. Rep. Candice Miller (MI-10) - Did not seek re-election in 2016 and resigned her seat in the House on December 31, 2016, in order to take office as Macomb County Public Works Commissioner the next day.
- Fmr. Rep. Mike Pompeo (KS-04) - Nominated by Donald Trump to be the Director of the Central Intelligence Agency.
- Fmr. Rep. Tom Price (GA-06) - Nominated by Donald Trump to be the 23rd Secretary of Health and Human Services.
- Fmr. Rep. Mick Mulvaney (SC-05) - Nominated by Donald Trump to be the Director of the Office of Management and Budget.
- Fmr. Rep. Scott Garrett (NJ-05) - Lost re-election in 2016; nominated by Donald Trump to be the head of the Export-Import Bank.
- Fmr. Rep. Jason Chaffetz (UT-03) - Resigned on June 30, 2017.
- Fmr. Rep. Lynn Jenkins (KS-02) - Chose not to run for re-election in 2018.
- Fmr. Co-Chair Rep. Rob Bishop (UT-01) Chose not to run for re-election in 2018.
- Sen. Cory Gardner (R-CO) – only caucus member in the United States Senate and he lost reelection
- Rep. Steve Southerland (FL-02)
- Rep. Mike McIntyre (NC-07)
- Rep. Randy Neugebauer (TX-19)
- Rep. Pete Olson (TX-22)
