= Elizabeth Price Foley =

American legal scholar

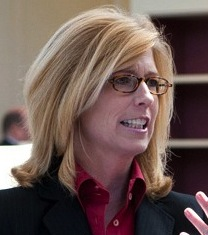
- Born: Elizabeth Price; 1965 (age 60–61); Atlanta, GA, U.S.
- Education: Emory University (BA); University of Tennessee (JD); Harvard University (LLM)
- Occupations: Professor of Law; lawyer; author
- Employer: Florida International University
- Known for: constitutional law and bioethics expertise
- Political party: Republican; Libertarian
- Spouse: Patrick Foley
- Children: Kathleen Foley
- Website: Elizabeth Price Foley

Elizabeth Price Foley (born 1965) is a conservative American legal theorist who writes and comments in the fields of constitutional law, bioethics, and health care law. She is a professor of law at Florida International University College of Law, a public law school located in Miami, Florida. She also serves as counsel to the Washington, D.C., office of BakerHostetler, LLP, where she practices constitutional, appellate, and food and drug law.

== Education ==
Foley received her bachelor's in history from Emory University. She received her Juris Doctor from University of Tennessee College of Law, where she graduated as class valedictorian and served as an articles editor of the Tennessee Law Review. She received her Master of Laws from Harvard Law School.

== Career ==
Foley was the chief architect, along with lawyer David B. Rivkin, of the House of Representatives' lawsuit against President Obama, challenging the constitutionality of the President's implementation of the Affordable Care Act. The lawsuit focused on the President's constitutional duty, under Article II, section 3 of the Constitution, to "take care that the laws be faithfully executed." Her testimony in February 2014 before the House Judiciary Committee provided a detailed four-part "roadmap" outlining how the House could obtain "institutional" standing to assert an institutional injury. Her subsequent testimony, in July 2014, before the House Rules Committee, provided further detail about her legal theory on both standing and the merits of a challenge based on the President's failure to faithfully execute the law.

Foley was a senior legislative aide for health policy to U.S. congressman Ron Wyden of Oregon and legislative aide to U.S. congressman Michael A. Andrews of Texas. She was a law clerk to Judge Carolyn Dineen King of the U.S. Court of Appeals for the Fifth Circuit, in Houston, Texas.

Foley held the rank of professor of law at Michigan State University College of Law and an adjunct professor at the Michigan State University College of Human Medicine. She joined the FIU College of Law as one of its "founding faculty" in 2002. Foley was awarded a Fulbright grant in spring 2011, conducting research on medical futility at the school of law at the National University of Ireland, Galway. As of 2020, she continues to teach at Florida International University, where she also served for a time as the executive director of the Florida chapter of the Institute for Justice, where she litigated constitutional cases relating to economic liberty, property rights, free speech, and school choice.

Foley was a member of the Committee on Guidelines for Human Embryonic Stem Cell Research of the Institute for Medicine, National Academy of Sciences. She presently serves on the editorial board of the Cato Supreme Court Review and on the research advisory council of the James Madison Institute.

== Books ==
Foley's most recent book is The Tea Party: Three Principles (Cambridge University Press, February 2012; ISBN 978-1-107-01135-9), In it, she challenges the media's characterization of the American Tea Party movement, asserting that it has been distorted in a way that prevents meaningful political dialogue and may even be dangerous for America's future. Foley sees the Tea Party as a movement of principles over politics. She identifies three "core principles" of American constitutional law that bind the decentralized, wide-ranging movement: limited government, unapologetic U.S. sovereignty, and constitutional originalism. These three principles, Foley explains, both define the Tea Party movement and predict its effect on the American political landscape. Foley explains the three principles' significance to the American founding and constitutional structure. She then connects the principles to current issues as health care reform, illegal immigration, the war on terror, and internationalism.

Foley's prior books include The Law of Life and Death (Harvard University Press, 2011; ISBN 978-0-674-05104-1), which examines the many, and surprisingly ambiguous, legal definitions of what counts as human life and death. The book was the basis for a Tedx talk, "When are you really dead?," delivered in fall 2012. In the book, Foley reveals that "not being dead" is not necessarily the same as being alive, in the eyes of the law. She also explains how the need for more organ transplants and the need to conserve health care resources are exerting steady pressure to expand the legal definition of death. As a result, death is being declared faster than ever before. The "right to die," Foley worries, may be morphing slowly into an obligation to die.

Her first book, Liberty for All: Reclaiming Individual Privacy in a New Era of Public Morality (Yale University Press, 2006; ISBN 978-0300109832), asserts that there is a "morality of American law", defined by the twin principles of limited government and residual individual sovereignty. These twin principles, moreover, reveal that there is a harm principle that animates American law and defines the moral use of governmental power to restrict individual liberty. In December 2006, the book won the Lysander Spooner Award for advancing the literature of liberty.

== Media appearances ==
Foley is a frequent commentator on constitutional and health care law for American media, including CNN, Fox News, The Washington Post, The Wall Street Journal, and Instapundit.
