= Constitutional challenges to the Affordable Care Act =

Since the passage of the Affordable Care Act (ACA), there have been numerous actions in federal courts to challenge the constitutionality of the legislation. They include challenges by states against the ACA, reactions from legal experts with respect to its constitutionality, several federal court rulings on the ACA's constitutionality, the final ruling on the constitutionality of the legislation by the U.S. Supreme Court in National Federation of Independent Business v. Sebelius, and notable subsequent lawsuits challenging the ACA. The Supreme Court upheld ACA for a third time in a June 2021 decision.

== Challenges by states ==
Some organizations and lawmakers who opposed the passage of the ACA took legal action following its passage. Several court challenges involved attempts to invalidate key provisions of the ACA. As of July 2013, none of these challenges had succeeded.

States (in red) challenging the constitutionality of ACA

Twenty-eight states filed joint or individual lawsuits (including 26 states engaged in a joint action) to strike down the ACA's individual mandate. In a press release, the Attorneys General for several states indicated their primary basis for the challenge was a violation of state sovereignty. Their release repeated the claim challenging the federal requirement under threat of penalty, that all citizens and legal residents have qualifying health care coverage. It also claimed that the law puts an unfair financial burden on state governments. The lawsuit states the following legal rationale:

Regulation of non-economic activity under the Commerce Clause is possible only through the Necessary and Proper Clause. The Necessary and Proper Clause confers supplemental authority only when the means adopted to accomplish an enumerated power are 'appropriate', are 'plainly adapted to that end', and are 'consistent with the letter and spirit of the constitution.' Requiring citizen-to-citizen subsidy or redistribution is contrary to the foundational assumptions of the constitutional compact.

Other states were either expected to join the multi-state lawsuit or are considering filing additional independent suits. Members of several state legislatures are attempting to counteract and prevent elements of the bill within their states. Legislators in 29 states have introduced measures to amend their constitutions to nullify portions of the health care reform law. Thirteen state statutes have been introduced to prohibit portions of the law; two states have already enacted statutory bans. Six legislatures had attempts to enact bans, but the measures were unsuccessful. In August 2010, a ballot initiative passed overwhelmingly in Missouri that would exempt the state from some provisions of the bill. Many Missouri legal analysts expect that the measure will be struck down if challenged in Federal court.

== Reactions from legal experts ==
In February 2011, Alexander Bolton wrote in The Hill that consensus among legal experts largely changed following Judge Roger Vinson's decision in Florida et al v. United States Department of Health and Human Services. Bolton said that prior to the ruling, it was widely felt that the Supreme Court would uphold the law by a comfortable margin, but now legal scholars generally feel it would be a 5–4 decision. Georgetown University Law Center professor Randy Barnett said, "There's been a big change in the conventional wisdom ... the temperature of law professors has changed considerably," and described the Florida decision as "extremely deep in its discussion of principles and constitutional doctrine".

== Lower federal courts (prior to the Supreme Court's decision) ==
=== District Court for the Northern District of Florida and the Court of Appeals for the Eleventh Circuit ===
On January 31, 2011, Judge Roger Vinson in Florida v. United States Department of Health and Human Services declared the law unconstitutional in an action brought by 26 states, on the grounds that the individual mandate to purchase insurance exceeds the authority of Congress to regulate interstate commerce. Vinson further ruled the clause was not severable, which had the effect of striking down the entire law.

On August 12, 2011, a divided three-judge panel of the 11th Circuit Court of Appeals affirmed Judge Vinson's decision in part: the court agreed that the mandate was unconstitutional, but held that it could be severed, allowing the rest of the ACA to remain.

In September 2011, the Department of Justice decided not to ask for an en banc review by the 11th Circuit, and instead asked the U.S. Supreme Court to hear the case. On November 14, 2011, the Supreme Court agreed to hear the case.

=== District Court for the Eastern District of Virginia and the Court of Appeals for the Fourth Circuit ===
Almost immediately after the passage of the ACA, the Virginia state legislature passed a law that purported to nullify the individual mandate provision of the federal Act. Virginia Attorney General Ken Cuccinelli then sued Secretary of Health and Human Services Kathleen Sebelius in the U.S. District Court for the Eastern District of Virginia. Cuccinelli's lawsuit was separate from the states participating in Florida's lawsuit. The case was heard by Judge Henry E. Hudson, who was appointed to the bench by George W. Bush.

On May 24, 2010, the Obama administration filed a motion to dismiss the lawsuit, arguing that states cannot escape federal law simply by passing state laws that contravene federal ones. Cuccinelli filed a counter-motion on June 7, rebutting federal claims and asserting that health insurance was not commerce as intended by the Constitution, and, thus, was not subject to regulation by Congress.

A hearing was held on July 2, 2010, where similar arguments were put forth by both sides. On December 13, 2010, Hudson ruled that the individual mandate portion of the health care bill was unconstitutional. However, Hudson did not block implementation of the law while the case continued working its way through the court system.

The Obama administration appealed the case to the United States Court of Appeals for the Fourth Circuit, which granted a request from both parties for an expedited process. On February 3, 2011, Cuccinelli announced that he intended to file an appeal directly with the Supreme Court, bypassing the Court of Appeals; this request was denied by the Supreme Court on April 25. Hearings were held on May 10, 2011, and May 13, 2011, in Richmond.

On September 8, 2011, the appellate court reversed Hudson's decision, in a decision issued by Judge Diana Gribbon Motz. The Fourth Circuit panel ruled that Virginia lacked subject-matter jurisdiction. The state law that was the basis of Cuccinelli's lawsuit was deemed invalid because Virginia lacks the authority to supersede or override federal law. Simply creating a law to use as a smokescreen for the guise of challenging a federal law did not constitute standing.

On September 30, 2011, Virginia requested that the Supreme Court issue certiorari to hear the case. The petition was denied on June 29, 2012.

=== District Court for the Western District of Virginia ===
On November 30, 2010, U.S. District Court Judge Norman K. Moon, who sits in Virginia, also declared the individual mandate constitutional in Liberty University v. Geithner. He also declared the employer mandate constitutional. He rejected two other arguments that government lawyers have made in cases across the country in defending the new law: first, that no one has legal standing to bring challenges at this point to the 2014 mandates, and second that any such challenge is premature. He rejected the challengers' basic argument that Congress had no authority to order someone to give up their own desire not to buy a commercial product and force them into a market they do not want to enter. He said:

Regardless of whether one relies on an insurance policy, one's savings, or the backstop of free or reduced-cost emergency room services, one has made a choice regarding the method of payment for the health care services one expects to receive. Far from "inactivity", by choosing to forgo insurance, [individuals] are making an economic decision to try to pay for health care services later, out of pocket, rather than now, through the purchase of insurance ... As Congress found, the total incidence of these economic decisions has a substantial impact on the national market for health care by collectively shifting billions of dollars on to other market participants and driving up the prices of insurance policies.

=== District Court for the District of Columbia ===
On February 22, 2011, Judge Gladys Kessler of the U.S. District Court for the District of Columbia, rejected a challenge to the law in Mead v. Holder by five individuals who argued, among other things, that the Patient Protection and Affordable Care Act violated the Religious Freedom Restoration Act, and that the individual mandate exceeded Congress's power under the Interstate Commerce Clause. Kessler rejected as "pure semantics" plaintiffs' argument that failing to acquire insurance was the regulation of inactivity, noting that "those who choose not to purchase health insurance will ultimately get a 'free ride' on the backs of those Americans who have made responsible choices to provide for the illness we all must face at some point in our lives." Kessler ruled that individual mandate was a valid exercise of Congress's power to regulate interstate commerce.

=== District Court for the Eastern District of Michigan and the Court of Appeals for the Sixth Circuit ===
On October 8, 2010, U.S. District Court Judge George Caram Steeh in Thomas More Law Center v. Obama wrote that in his view the ACA, including the individual mandate, was constitutional. He rejected a private suit filed by Michigan's Thomas More Law Center and several state residents that focused on the Commerce Clause, deciding that Congress had the power to pass the law because it affected interstate commerce and was part of a broader regulatory scheme.

On June 29, 2011, a divided three-judge panel of the Sixth Circuit Court of Appeals affirmed the decision. Judge Jeffrey Sutton, a member of the three judge panel appointed by George W. Bush, was the first Republican-appointed judge to rule that the law is constitutional.

=== Court of Appeals for the District of Columbia Circuit ===
In Seven-Sky v. Holder on November 8, 2011, the U.S. Court of Appeals for the District of Columbia upheld the constitutionality of the law. The decision was written by Senior Judge Laurence Silberman, a prominent conservative judge, and joined by Senior Judge Harry T. Edwards, who also filed a concurring opinion. Judge Brett Kavanaugh dissented, stating that the Tax Anti-Injunction Act precluded the court from hearing the case until after the individual mandate took effect. It was reported that the Supreme Court might attempt to follow Kavanaugh's opinion had they wished to hold off on deciding the issue. The Supreme Court indeed heard oral arguments regarding the Tax Anti-Injunction Act, ultimately unanimously ruling (though with differing rationales) that it did not apply to this case.

== U.S. Supreme Court ==
On November 14, 2011, the Supreme Court of the United States issued a writ of certiorari to the United States Appeals Court for the Eleventh Circuit to consider appeals to its rulings in National Federation of Independent Business v. Sebelius and Florida v. United States Department of Health and Human Services. The Court heard oral arguments March 26–28, 2012 and decided the consolidated case on June 28, 2012.

Although the Supreme Court declared that the law could not have been upheld under an argument based on the regulatory power of Congress under the Commerce Clause, the Court declared that the legislatively-declared "penalty" was constitutional as a valid exercise of the Congressional power to tax, thus upholding the individual mandate. The Court also limited the expansion of Medicaid initially proposed under the ACA. All provisions of the ACA continue to be in effect, with some limits on the Medicaid expansion.

== Follow-up litigation ==
As of August 2013, scores of lawsuits were still targeting parts of the ACA.

The Pacific Legal Foundation initiated a lawsuit, Sissel v. U.S. Dept. Health & Human Services, in the U.S. District Court for the District of Columbia arguing that the ACA was still unconstitutional, even in light of the "saving construction" given the law in NFIB v. Sebelius, on the ground that the enactment of the essential coverage mandate violated the Origination Clause. The suit also sought clarification from the District Court as to what extent lower courts were legally bound by the conclusion of Chief Justice Roberts and the four dissenting justices that the Act did not pass constitutional scrutiny by way of the Commerce and Necessary & Proper Clauses. On June 28, 2013, the District Court dismissed the plaintiff's suit, holding (1) that the Commerce Clause challenge to the ACA was foreclosed by the Supreme Court decision in NFIB v. Sebelius, (2) that the Origination Clause challenge failed, as the bill enacting the individual mandate was not a bill for raising revenue, and (3) that even if the bill enacting the individual mandate were a bill for raising revenue, the Origination Clause challenge failed because the bill was an amendment to a bill that had originated in the House of Representatives. On July 29, 2014, that decision was affirmed by the United States Court of Appeals for the District of Columbia Circuit. However, the Court of Appeals concluded that section 5000A of the Internal Revenue Code (sometimes called the "individual mandate") was not a "Bill for raising Revenue", and thus was not subject to the restriction in the Origination Clause of the Constitution. The Court of Appeals stated that, therefore, there was no reason for the Court to determine whether the bill originated in the House of Representatives. The Court also rejected Sissel's contention that the law violated the Commerce Clause of the Constitution, stating that the U.S. Supreme Court's decision in 2012 in the case of National Federation of Independent Business v. Sebelius "necessarily disposes of Sissel's Commerce Clause claim."

The Goldwater Institute challenged the ACA in Coons v. Geithner by targeting the Independent Payment Advisory Board. According to the Goldwater Institute, the board "will be able to dictate how much doctors can charge for medical care, how insurance companies will pay for it, and when patients can get access to cutting-edge treatments." The litigants argued that because these decisions could not be reviewed by Congress or the courts, the health care legislation violated the separation of powers doctrine. The last claims in the lawsuit were dismissed on December 19, 2012.

In August 2013, a U.S. District Court denied the federal government's motion for complete dismissal of a state of Oklahoma lawsuit, Pruitt v. Sebelius, challenging some tax aspects of the ACA, and allowed the lawsuit to proceed. Republican Oklahoma Attorney General Scott Pruitt said: "Oklahoma challenged implementation of the Affordable Care Act after the IRS finalized a rule that would allow the federal government to punish 'large employers' including local government with millions of dollars of tax penalties in states without health care exchanges, which is not allowed under the health care law." AG Pruitt contends that the law as passed allowed these federal penalties to be assessed in states with state insurance exchanges, but did not allow for the same fines to be assessed in states which chose not to set up a state exchange, and thus would be operating under the federal insurance exchanges.

A lawsuit entitled United States House of Representatives v. Price (previously Burwell) was filed in late 2014 concerning the cost-sharing program and implementation of the law. The case was eventually settled before the Court of Appeals in D.C.

In February 2018, 20 states, led by Texas Attorney General Ken Paxton and Wisconsin Attorney General Brad Schimel, filed a lawsuit against the federal government alleging the ACA is now unconstitutional because the individual mandate tax which NFIB v. Sebelius rested on was repealed by the Tax Cuts and Jobs Act of 2017. In December 2018, he declared the entire law to be unconstitutional.

In March 2018, in a suit brought by Texas and other states, Judge Reed O'Connor of the Northern District of Texas ruled against the imposition of a federal tax on states as a condition of continuing to receive Medicaid funds, ruling that while the tax was lawful, the regulation implementing it violated the nondelegation doctrine and the Administrative Procedure Act. As the Trump administration refused to appeal the decision, a coalition of states led by California led the appeal to this ruling to the Fifth Circuit, which upheld it in parts. Both parties sought review by the Supreme Court, which ruled on June 17, 2021 in California v. Texas that Texas and the other plaintiff states did not have standing to challenge the individual mandate provision to begin with.

In September 2022, the same district court judge, Reed O'Connor, ruled that the legal requirements to cover HIV-prevention drugs, as prescribed by section 1001(5) of the Affordable Care Act, violate the Constitution of the United States. The ruling was upheld by the Fifth Circuit in June 2024, which ruled that because members of the United States Preventive Services Task Force body are not confirmed by the Senate, their requirements were unconstitutional. The Supreme Court accepted the case in January 2025 and heard arguments in April under the name Kennedy v. Braidwood Management, Inc.

== See also ==
- King v. Burwell
- Zubik v. Burwell
- United States House of Representatives v. Price
- Efforts to repeal the Patient Protection and Affordable Care Act
