= United States House of Representatives v. Azar =

Lawsuit

United States House of Representatives v. Azar, et al. (previously v. Price, et al.; originally v. Burwell, et al.) was a lawsuit in which the United States House of Representatives sued departments and officials within the executive branch, asserting that President Barack Obama acted illegally in his implementation of the Patient Protection and Affordable Care Act. The lawsuit was touted by House Speaker John Boehner, and asserted that President Obama exceeded his constitutional authority in delaying the implementation of the employer mandate of the Affordable Care Act and also addressed "Republican opposition to an estimated $175 billion in payments to insurance companies over the next 10 years as part of a cost-sharing program under the healthcare law."

U.S. District Judge Rosemary M. Collyer ruled that the cost-sharing program was unconstitutional for spending money that has not been specifically provided by an act of Congress, but concluded that Congress had in fact authorized that program to be created. The judge also found that Congress had provided authority to cover the spending for the tax credits to consumers who use them to help afford health coverage. The judge enjoined further cost-sharing payments, but stayed the order pending appeal, to the United States Court of Appeals for the District of Columbia Circuit. The case ended in a settlement before the Circuit Court.

== History ==
The chief architects of the lawsuit were Florida International University law professor Elizabeth Price Foley and lawyer David B. Rivkin. The lawsuit was authorized to challenge the actions by the President or other executive branch officials inconsistent with their duties under the Constitution, under Article II, section 3 of the Constitution, to "take care that the laws be faithfully executed." Foley testified in February 2014 before the House Judiciary Committee, providing a detailed four-part "roadmap" outlining how she believed the House could obtain "institutional" standing to assert an institutional injury. Her subsequent testimony, in July 2014, before the House Rules Committee, provided further detail about her legal theory on both standing and the merits of a challenge based on the President's asserted failure to faithfully execute the law.

On July 30, 2014, the House by a party-line vote of 225 to 201 approved a simple resolution to move forward with a lawsuit to force the President to impose penalties on companies who failed to provide health care coverage for their employees. All 225 votes in favor of filing the lawsuit were from Republicans, while 5 Republicans voted with 196 Democrats in opposition. The vote authorized the initiation of "litigation for actions by the President or other executive branch officials inconsistent with their duties under the Constitution of the United States". On August 25, the House of Representatives retained the services of David Rivkin at a rate of $500 per hour with a cap of $350,000 for work on the lawsuit until January 2015. It was speculated that because the delay of the employer mandate will end by January 2015, the lawsuit, if filed, will likely become moot by then. It was speculated that the plaintiff would choose to file either in the United States District Court for the District of Columbia (where Congress is physically located), or in a district that is politically hostile to Obama, on the theory that a lawsuit brought on behalf of the House could be brought where any House member lives. It was noted, however, that conservative judges tend to construe standing issues narrowly, and would therefore be more likely to dismiss the case. The case was ultimately filed in the District of Columbia.

After the first two law firms hired to file the suit quit, the House GOP leadership was said to be exploring other options. On November 18, 2014, it was reported that Jonathan Turley, a law professor at the George Washington University Law School had been hired to prosecute the litigation.

The House filed suit on November 21, 2014, one day after President Obama issued executive orders on immigration reform. The named defendants were Secretary of Health and Human Services Sylvia Burwell and Secretary of Treasury Jacob Lew, as well as the departments that they oversaw. Republicans discussed expanding the scope of the lawsuit to include the executive orders that Obama issued on immigration, but the scope of the lawsuit was not expanded (the immigration issue ultimately became a separate case, United States v. Texas).

== Rulings ==
=== Motion to dismiss lawsuit ===
The Obama administration challenged the plaintiff's lawsuit on the issue of standing, and asked that the lawsuit be dismissed. On September 9, 2015, Judge Collyer ruled that the House of Representatives does not have standing to sue secretaries Burwell and Lew for improperly amending the healthcare law. Judge Collyer also ruled that the House of Representatives does have standing to pursue the claims that the secretaries violated the Constitution by spending funds Congress did not appropriate. The Obama Administration vowed to appeal the ruling, calling it "unprecedented", and describing the case as "just another partisan attack".

=== Ruling on the merits ===
On May 12, 2016, Judge Collyer granted summary judgment in favor of the House of Representatives on the merits of the case, saying that the cost-sharing program under the Affordable Care Act, as implemented since January 2014, has been spending money that Congress did not approve. Such spending was unconstitutional because no money can be taken out of the federal treasury if it has not been specifically provided by act of Congress. Judge Collyer criticized the government's arguments in favor of the cost-sharing reimbursements as "most curious and convoluted", adding its "mother was undoubtedly necessity". She did, however, conclude that Congress had in fact authorized that program to be created. The judge also found that Congress had provided authority to cover the spending for the tax credits to consumers who use them to help afford health coverage.

Judge Collyer enjoined reimbursements under the ACA until a valid appropriation was in place, but stayed the injunction. Accordingly, the subsidies were allowed to continue, pending appeal, which was filed on July 16, 2016.

=== Stay of proceedings ===
On December 5, 2016, the United States Court of Appeals for the District of Columbia Circuit stayed further proceedings in the case at the request of the House of Representatives. Motions to govern further proceedings in the case were due February 21, 2017. The case was subsequently stayed further with status updates every three months. On August 1, 2017, the appeals court granted a request from 17 states plus D.C. to intervene in the lawsuit and held the case in abeyance until October 30, 2017.

=== Settlement ===
On December 15, 2017, a settlement was agreed to which dismissed the appeal and dissolved the injunction of the lower court. In effect, it left in place the decision that the House had the standing to bring the suit, but would prevent it from being binding in future such cases, and eliminated the injunction that prohibited the cost-sharing reduction payments so that a future administration could theoretically resume the payments.

The Trump administration had previously decided to voluntarily terminate the cost-sharing reduction payments in October.

== Reactions ==
The action was noted to be "the first time either the House or Senate as an institution has brought a lawsuit against a president over enforcement of the law", and the vote described as "a historic foray in the fight over constitutional checks and balances". Political commentators speculated that the proposal of a lawsuit was designed to supplant efforts to impeach Barack Obama, based on Boehner's experience with the impeachment of Bill Clinton. The commentators also believed that on its merits the lawsuit had many shortcomings, and legal experts said that it was likely to fail.

Observers noted that Republicans had previously pressed for legislation to delay both the employer and individual mandates the previous year, and that the day after voting to sue the President for what he saw as ignoring a law passed by Congress, Boehner called on the President to act on his own (despite inaction by Congress) to deal with the 2014 American immigration crisis. Obama responded to the plan to authorize a lawsuit against him, "Everyone sees this as a political stunt, but it’s worse than that because every vote they’re taking ... means a vote they’re not taking to help people." Some prominent conservatives have ridiculed the lawsuit as being wasteful "political theater" and a "foolish move", while others criticized it for not going far enough, preferring to press for impeachment.

Prior to the filing of the lawsuit, legal experts said that the lawsuit would likely fail for any of several different reasons, including lack of standing, presidential leeway to enforce laws, no easy legal remedy, and "impeachment" being a more applicable action.

== Similar lawsuits ==
Florida orthodontist and Republican political activist Larry Kawa, and conservative legal advocacy group Judicial Watch, filed a similar lawsuit against President Obama in October 2013, claiming that he has "spent time and money to prepare for the Jan. 1, 2014" deadline for the employer mandate. Kawa claimed to have spent "100 hours preparing for the employer mandate", with an estimated "opportunity cost of $1.1 million". The orthodontist's lawsuit was dismissed in January 2014 for "lack of standing", but opening arguments for an appeal in the United States Court of Appeals for the Eleventh Circuit began on October 14, 2014. Kawa and Judicial Watch, like the backers of the House resolution, oppose the Affordable Care Act and have said they believe the law should be vigorously enforced to accelerate its failure. On July 29, 2014 Robert Muise filed a similar case for the American Freedom Law Center against President Obama. In May, 2015, the case was dismissed for lack of standing.

== See also ==
- Authorization bill
- Appropriations bill (United States)
- Constitutional challenges to the Affordable Care Act
