= Bob Jones University v. United States =

- Supreme Court of the United States

Argued October 12, 1982 Decided May 24, 1983
- Full case name: Bob Jones University v. United States
- Citations: 461 U.S. 574 (more) 103 S. Ct. 2017; 76 L. Ed. 2d 157; 1983 U.S. LEXIS 36; 51 U.S.L.W. 4593; 83-1 U.S. Tax Cas. (CCH) ¶ 9366; 52 A.F.T.R.2d (RIA) 5001

Case history
- Prior: Certiorari to the United States Court of Appeals for the Fourth Circuit

Holding
- "Neither petitioner qualifies as a tax-exempt organization...[i]t would be wholly incompatible with the concepts underlying tax exemption to grant tax-exempt status to racially discriminatory private educational entities. Whatever may be the rationale for such private schools' policies, racial discrimination in education is contrary to public policy. Racially discriminatory educational institutions cannot be viewed as conferring a public benefit within the above 'charitable' concept or within the congressional intent underlying 501(c)(3)."

Court membership
- Chief Justice Warren E. Burger Associate Justices William J. Brennan Jr. · Byron White; Thurgood Marshall · Harry Blackmun; Lewis F. Powell Jr. · William Rehnquist; John P. Stevens · Sandra Day O'Connor

Case opinions
- Majority: Burger, joined by Brennan, White, Marshall, Blackmun, Stevens, O'Connor; Powell (Part III)
- Concurrence: Powell (in part)
- Dissent: Rehnquist

Laws applied
- 26 U.S.C. § 170, § 501(c)(3)
- This case overturned a previous ruling or rulings
- Plessy v. Ferguson (1896) (Note: Plessy has never been explicitly and specifically overruled, and though while many consider Brown v. Board of Education (1954) to be the most major "overruling" of Plessy, the United States Congress considers Bob Jones University to overrule Plessy.)

Bob Jones University v. United States, 461 U.S. 574 (1983), was a decision by the United States Supreme Court holding that the religion clauses of the First Amendment did not prohibit the Internal Revenue Service from revoking the tax exempt status of a religious university whose practices are contrary to a compelling government public policy, such as eradicating racial discrimination.

== Background ==
Bob Jones University is a large, private Christian educational institution in South Carolina, serving students from kindergarten through graduate school. It is a nonprofit corporation with a core mission to provide education rooted in its specific fundamentalist interpretation of the Bible. It requires its teachers to be devout Christians, teaches all subjects from a biblical perspective, carefully screens applicants' religious beliefs, and strictly regulates student behavior according to its religious standards.

Because of its interpretation of Biblical principles regarding interracial dating, Bob Jones University completely excluded black applicants until 1971, and from 1971 until 1975, admitted black students only if they were married. After 1975, the university began to admit unmarried black applicants, but continued to deny "admission to applicants engaged in an interracial marriage or known to advocate interracial marriage or dating." The university also imposed a disciplinary rule that prohibited interracial dating.

Under pre-1970 IRS regulations, tax exemptions were awarded to private schools regardless of their racial admissions policies, and Bob Jones University was approved for a tax exemption under that policy. Pursuant to a 1970 revision to IRS regulations that limited tax-exempt status to private schools without racially discriminatory admissions policies, the IRS informed the University on November 30, 1970, that the IRS was planning to revoke its tax-exempt status as a "religious, charitable . . . or educational" institution. In response, the university filed suit in 1971 in Bob Jones University v. Schultz.

The United States District Court for the District of South Carolina granted a preliminary injunction, but the United States Court of Appeals for the Fourth Circuit reversed in 1973, citing the Anti-Injunction Act.

The university petitioned for a rehearing in the Appeals Court in Bob Jones University v. Connally. The Appeals Court ruled March 21, 1973, stating that Americans United v. Walters did not conflict with the decision in 1973.

The Supreme Court affirmed the Court of Appeals decision in Bob Jones University v. Simon (416 US 725). The case was decided May 15, 1974, in an 8–0 decision (Douglas not participating). They stated that there was a lack of proof of "irreparable injury." Justice Powell wrote the decision.

The IRS again notified the University on April 16, 1975, of the proposed revocation. Officially, the IRS revoked the university's tax exempt status on January 19, 1976. The university paid $21 in unemployment taxes for one employee for tax year 1975 and then filed for a refund in the United States District Court for the District of South Carolina. The Government counterclaimed for unpaid federal unemployment taxes for the taxable years 1971 through 1975, in the amount of $489,675.59, plus interest.

The District Court ruled December 26, 1978, that the IRS had violated the university's First Amendment rights, and ordered the IRS to refund the university the $21 of taxes that it had paid.

The United States Court of Appeals of the Fourth Circuit ruled that the case be sent back to the District Court.

== Supreme Court decision ==
Bob Jones University v. United States was decided May 24, 1983, in an 8–1 decision with the majority opinion written by Warren E. Burger, and joined by William J. Brennan, Byron R. White, Thurgood Marshall, Harry A. Blackmun, John Paul Stevens, and Sandra Day O'Connor. The Court, speaking through Burger, read a "common law" public interest requirement into the statute governing tax-exempt charitable status based on IRS Revenue Ruling 71-447, and cited Congress' refusal to intervene as proof that they approved of the IRS's construction of the statute.

In an 1861 decision Perin v. Carey the Supreme Court said public charitable uses must be consistent with public policy. An organization whose purpose clashes with the public conscience cannot be said to confer a true public benefit, and thus does not deserve the tax-exempt status. An organization qualified for a tax exemption under section 501(c)(3) only if:

1. It provided a public benefit that society needs or that complements public services.
2. Its purpose aligned with the public interest and is not fundamentally at odds with the community's shared values.

The government's position was that racially discriminatory private schools do not qualify for the special benefit of tax-exempt status. There is a long and unwavering national policy, affirmed by successive presidential administrations, dedicated to the eradication of racial discrimination in American life. As the Supreme Court established in Walz v. Tax Commission, the tax-exempt privilege is reserved for entities that act as “beneficial and stabilizing influences in community life.” An institution that practices racial discrimination, particularly given the nation's painful history with segregation, operates in direct opposition to the community's conscience and cannot meet this standard. Granting such an institution tax-exempt status would force all taxpayers to subsidize conduct that is contrary to public policy.

BJU argued that only Congress can change the tax law's application. The Court ruled that while Congress retains ultimate oversight, the primary responsibility for interpreting the tax code falls to the IRS. By 1970, a firm national policy against racial discrimination had been definitively established by all three branches of the United States government. It would have been illogical and contradictory for the IRS—an arm of the Executive Branch—to grant the "charitable" tax exemption to private schools whose racially discriminatory practices directly defied this firm public policy. Such schools cannot be considered "charitable" organizations that provide a "beneficial and stabilizing influence in community life," as required by the tax code.

BJU raised a final, distinct constitutional claim: even if the IRS policy was valid for secular private schools, it cannot be applied to religious schools whose racial discrimination is based on sincere religious belief. BJU argued that denying it tax exemption for practicing its faith in this manner violated its First Amendment right to free exercise of religion. This presented a novel claim for the Court to consider.

The Court applied a strict scrutiny analysis and found that the "Government has a fundamental, overriding interest in eradicating racial discrimination in education . . . which substantially outweighs whatever burden denial of tax benefits places on [the University's] exercise of their religious beliefs." The Court made clear, however, that its holding dealt "only with religious schools—not with churches or other purely religious institutions."

Lewis F. Powell wrote a separate concurring opinion, emphasizing the importance of Congressional approval for administrative policy changes. William H. Rehnquist was the sole dissenter, arguing that the literal terms of the governing statute could not be read to exclude Bob Jones University from charitable status.

== Aftermath ==
The case has been cited in many subsequent decisions as well as by commentators, due to the significance of the precedent it established.

In 2000, BJU president Bob Jones III announced on Larry King Live that the school had dropped its ban on interracial dating. The change was prompted by a media uproar after a visit to the school by then-presidential candidate George W. Bush. In February 2017, BJU president Steve Pettit announced that the school had regained its tax-exempt status.

== See also ==
- List of United States Supreme Court cases, volume 461
- Coit v. Green (1971)
