= George C. Pratt =

American judge (1928–2025)

George Pratt

Senior Judge of the United States Court of Appeals for the Second Circuit
- In office May 22, 1993 – January 31, 1995

Judge of the United States Court of Appeals for the Second Circuit
- In office June 21, 1982 – May 22, 1993
- Appointed by: Ronald Reagan
- Preceded by: William H. Timbers
- Succeeded by: Pierre N. Leval

Judge of the United States District Court for the Eastern District of New York
- In office May 7, 1976 – June 29, 1982
- Appointed by: Gerald Ford
- Preceded by: Anthony J. Travia
- Succeeded by: Leonard D. Wexler

Personal details
- Born: George Cheney Pratt; May 22, 1928 Corning, New York, U.S.
- Died: December 8, 2025 (aged 97) Syosset, New York, U.S.
- Education: Yale University (BA, JD)

George Cheney Pratt (May 22, 1928 – December 8, 2025) was a United States federal judge who served on the District Court for the Eastern District of New York and on the Court of Appeals for the Second Circuit. In 2013, he was listed as a NAFTA adjudicator.

== Education and career ==
Pratt was born in Corning, New York, to a judicial family—his father, grandfather and great-grandfather were all state court judges in Steuben County.

He received a Bachelor of Arts degree from Yale University in 1950. He received a Juris Doctor from Yale Law School in 1953. He was a law clerk for Judge Charles W. Froessel of the New York State Court of Appeals from 1953 to 1955. He was in private practice of law in Nassau County, New York from 1955 to 1976. He was an adjunct professor at St. John's University School of Law from 1978 to 1992. He was a distinguished visiting professor of law at Hofstra University from 1979 to 1993. He was an adjunct professor at Touro Law Center from 1985 to 1993. He was a Professor of Law at Touro Law Center from 1993 to 2003.

== Federal judicial service ==
Pratt was nominated by President Gerald Ford on April 13, 1976, to a seat on the United States District Court for the Eastern District of New York vacated by Judge Anthony J. Travia. He was confirmed by the United States Senate on May 6, 1976, and received commission on May 7, 1976. His service was terminated on June 29, 1982, due to elevation to the Second Circuit.

Pratt was a federal judge on the United States Court of Appeals for the Second Circuit. Pratt was nominated by President Ronald Reagan on April 26, 1982, to a seat on the United States Court of Appeals for the Second Circuit vacated by Judge William H. Timbers. He was confirmed by the Senate on June 18, 1982, and received commission on June 21, 1982. He assumed senior status on May 22, 1993. His service was terminated on January 31, 1995, due to retirement.

== Post-judicial service ==
From 2001, Pratt engaged in the private practice of law in Uniondale, New York. From 2013, he served as a NAFTA adjudicator. Pratt died in Syosset, New York, on December 8, 2025, at the age of 97.

Legal offices
Preceded by Anthony J. Travia	Judge of the United States District Court for the Eastern District of New York; 1976–1982	Succeeded by Leonard D. Wexler
Preceded by William H. Timbers	Judge of the United States Court of Appeals for the Second Circuit; 1982–1993	Succeeded by Pierre N. Leval
