= Orelia Merchant =

American judge (born 1971)

Orelia E. Merchant
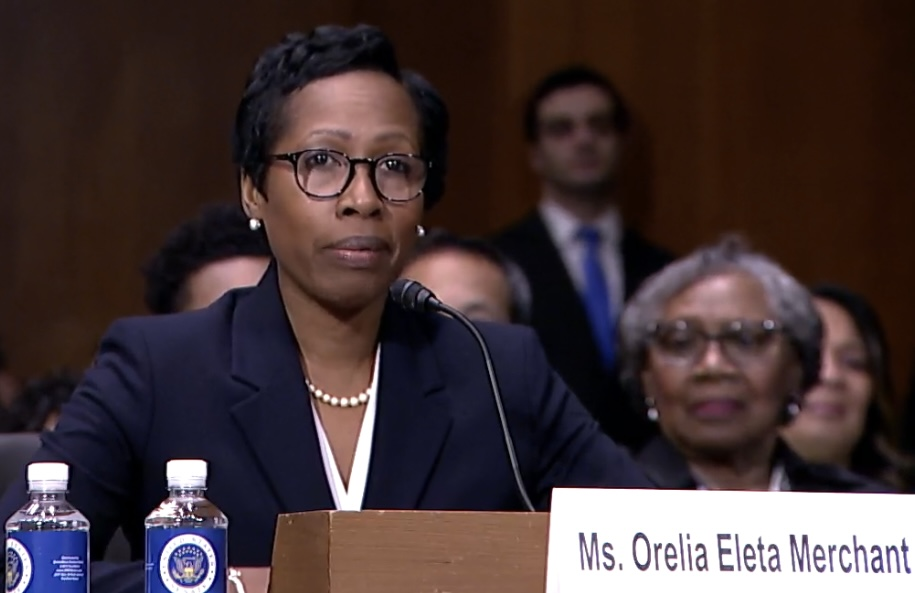

Judge of the United States District Court for the Eastern District of New York
- Incumbent
- Assumed office May 12, 2023
- Appointed by: Joe Biden
- Preceded by: William F. Kuntz II

Personal details
- Born: 1971 (age 54–55) The Bronx, New York, U.S.
- Spouse: Karim Camara
- Education: Dillard University (BS); College of William & Mary (MA); Tulane University (JD)

Orelia Eleta Merchant (born 1971) is an American lawyer who serves as a United States district judge of the United States District Court for the Eastern District of New York. She previously served as chief deputy attorney general for state counsel in the New York Attorney General's Office.

== Education ==
Merchant earned a Bachelor of Science degree in physics and mathematics from Dillard University in 1992, a Master of Arts in marine science from the College of William & Mary in 1995, and a Juris Doctor from the Tulane University Law School in 1998.

== Career ==
From 1998 to 2002, Merchant served as Assistant Regional Counsel in the United States Environmental Protection Agency. In 2000 and 2001, Merchant served as a special assistant United States attorney in the United States Attorney's Office for the Eastern District of Louisiana. Merchant served as an assistant United States attorney in the United States Attorney's Office for the Eastern District of New York from 2002 to 2016 and executive assistant United States attorney from 2016 to 2019. She joined the New York Attorney General's Office in 2019 and left in 2023 when she became a district court judge.

=== Federal judicial service ===
Merchant was recommended to President Joe Biden by Senator Chuck Schumer. On September 2, 2022, President Biden announced his intent to nominate Merchant to serve as a United States district judge of the United States District Court for the Eastern District of New York. On September 6, 2022, her nomination was sent to the Senate. President Biden nominated Merchant to the seat vacated by Judge William F. Kuntz II, who assumed senior status on January 1, 2022. On January 3, 2023, her nomination was returned to the President under Rule XXXI, Paragraph 6 of the United States Senate. She was renominated on January 23, 2023. On January 25, 2023, a hearing on her nomination was held before the Senate Judiciary Committee. On April 20, 2023, her nomination was reported out of committee by a 12–9 vote. On May 2, 2023, the Senate invoked cloture on her nomination by a 51–48 vote. On May 3, 2023, her nomination was confirmed by a 51–48 vote. She received her judicial commission on May 12, 2023.

== See also ==
- List of African-American federal judges
- List of African-American jurists

Legal offices
Preceded by William F. Kuntz II	Judge of the United States District Court for the Eastern District of New York; 2023–present	Incumbent
