= Nina Gershon =

American judge (born 1940)

Senior Judge of the United States District Court for the Eastern District of New York
- Incumbent
- Assumed office October 16, 2008

Judge of the United States District Court for the Eastern District of New York
- In office August 1, 1996 – October 16, 2008
- Appointed by: Bill Clinton
- Preceded by: Leonard D. Wexler
- Succeeded by: William F. Kuntz II

Magistrate Judge of the United States District Court for the Southern District of New York
- In office 1976–1996

Personal details
- Born: October 16, 1940 (age 85) Chicago, Illinois, U.S.
- Education: Cornell University (BA); Yale University (LLB)

Nina Gershon (born October 16, 1940) is a United States district judge of the United States District Court for the Eastern District of New York. She was appointed by President Bill Clinton in 1996 at the recommendation of Senator Daniel Patrick Moynihan. She assumed senior status on October 16, 2008.

== Education and career ==
Born in Chicago, Illinois, Gershon received a Bachelor of Arts degree in English with honors from Cornell University in 1962 and a Bachelor of Laws from Yale Law School in 1965. In 1965 and 1966, she was a Fulbright Scholar at the London School of Economics' Hampstead Clinic. She was a Staff attorney of the Appellate Division of the Supreme Court of the State of New York, Mental Health Information Service from 1966 to 1968, and was then assistant corporation counsel with the Appeals Division of the New York City Law Department from 1968 to 1969, and from 1970 to 1972. She was a professor of law and political science at the University of California, San Diego from 1969 to 1970. She was an attorney for the New York City Law Department from 1972 to 1976, serving as Chief of the Federal Appeals Division from 1972 to 1975 and Chief of the Consumer Protection Division from 1975 to 1976.

== Federal judicial service ==
In 1976, Gershon became a United States magistrate judge of the Southern District of New York, an office she would hold for twenty years. She was also an adjunct professor of law at the Cardozo School of Law from 1986 to 1988. On October 18, 1995, Gershon was nominated by President Bill Clinton to a seat on the United States District Court for the Eastern District of New York vacated by Leonard D. Wexler. She was confirmed by the United States Senate on July 30, 1996, and received her commission on August 1, 1996. She assumed senior status on October 16, 2008.

=== Notable cases ===
- In the 1970s, working as a lawyer for New York City, Gershon won a court ruling that rejected the building of Grand Central Tower on top of Grand Central Terminal, which would have ruined the historical site. The ruling was later upheld in Penn Central Transportation Co. v. New York City.
- In 1999, Gershon ruled that New York City mayor Rudolph Giuliani could not cut the Brooklyn Museum of Art's funding after it mounted an exhibit entitled "Sensation". Giuliani described the works in the exhibit as "sick" and "disgusting."
- In 2000, Gershon ruled that New York's century-old kosher food laws violated the First Amendment.
- In the spring of 2006, Gershon presided over the trial of Shahawar Matin Siraj, a Pakistani immigrant who was accused of plotting to blow up New York's Herald Square subway station. After a four-week trial, a jury found Siraj guilty of four crimes, including plotting to bomb a public transportation system. On January 8, 2007, Gershon sentenced Siraj to 30 years imprisonment for his role in the plot.
- On December 11, 2009, Judge Gershon issued a preliminary injunction against the United States Government preventing the implementation of a law barring the Association of Community Organizations for Reform Now (ACORN) from receiving federal funds. Judge Gerson found that the law, passed as part of an Appropriation bill, was an unconstitutional Bill of attainder. The Second Circuit Court of Appeals overturned this decision on August 13, 2010.

== See also ==
- List of Jewish American jurists

Legal offices
Preceded by Leonard D. Wexler	Judge of the United States District Court for the Eastern District of New York; 1996–2008	Succeeded by William F. Kuntz II
