= Sissel v. United States Department of Health & Human Services =

US Court of Appeals case

- No. 13-5202
- Court: United States Court of Appeals for the District of Columbia Circuit
- Full case name: Matt Sissel, Appellant v. United States Department of Health & Human Services
- Argued: May 8, 2014
- Decided: July 29, 2014
- Citation: 760 F.3d 1 (D.C. Cir. 2014)

Case history
- Prior actions: Petitioner's claim dismissed, 951 F. Supp. 2d 159 (D.D.C. 2013)
- Subsequent action: Rehearing en banc denied (D.C. Cir. August 7, 2015).

Court membership
- Judges sitting: Judith W. Rogers, Nina Pillard, Robert L. Wilkins

Case opinions
- Rogers

Keywords
- Origination Clause, Affordable Care Act

Sissel v. United States Department of Health & Human Services was a lawsuit filed by the Pacific Legal Foundation as a constitutional challenge to the Patient Protection and Affordable Care Act (ACA). The plaintiffs claimed that the ACA's enactment violated the Origination Clause of the Constitution. The suit was dismissed by the U.S. District Court for the District of Columbia, and the dismissal was affirmed by the U.S. Court of Appeals for the District of Columbia Circuit. The plaintiffs sought review by the U.S. Supreme Court, which declined to hear an appeal.

== Background of the case ==
The plaintiffs filed suit in the U.S. District Court for the District of Columbia, arguing that the ACA was unconstitutional, even in light of the "saving construction" given the law in National Federation of Independent Business v. Sebelius. on the ground that the enactment of the essential coverage mandate violated the Origination Clause. The suit also sought clarification from the District Court as to what extent lower courts were legally bound by the conclusion of Chief Justice Roberts and the four dissenting justices that the Act did not pass constitutional scrutiny by way of the Commerce Clause and Necessary and Proper Clause.

== District court ==
On June 28, 2013, U.S. District Judge Beryl A. Howell dismissed the plaintiff's suit, holding (1) that the Commerce Clause challenge to the ACA was foreclosed by the Supreme Court decision in NFIB v. Sebelius, (2) that the Origination Clause challenge failed, as the bill enacting the individual mandate was not a bill for raising revenue, and (3) that even if the bill enacting the individual mandate were a bill for raising revenue, the Origination Clause challenge failed because the bill was an amendment to a bill that had originated in the House of Representatives.

== Court of appeals ruling ==
On July 29, 2014, the district court's decision was affirmed by the United States Court of Appeals for the District of Columbia Circuit. The Court of Appeals concluded that section 5000A of the Internal Revenue Code (sometimes called the "individual mandate") was not a "Bill for raising Revenue" and thus was not subject to the restriction in the Origination Clause of the Constitution. The Court of Appeals stated that it was therefore unnecessary for the Court to determine whether the bill originated in the House of Representatives. The Court also rejected Sissel's contention that the law violated the Commerce Clause of the Constitution, stating that the U.S. Supreme Court's decision in 2012 in the case of NFIB v. Sebelius "necessarily disposes of Sissel's Commerce Clause claim."

== Subsequent actions ==
Plaintiffs filed a petition for rehearing en banc. In August 2015, the petition was denied. Four judges dissented from the denial of rehearing. The judges wrote an opinion dissenting from the denial of rehearing and on the merits of Sissel's claim. They agreed with the three-judge panel's rejection of the petitioner's claim, but offered a different rationale.

On January 19, 2016, the Supreme Court denied a writ of certiorari.
