= William F. Kuntz II =

American judge (born 1950)

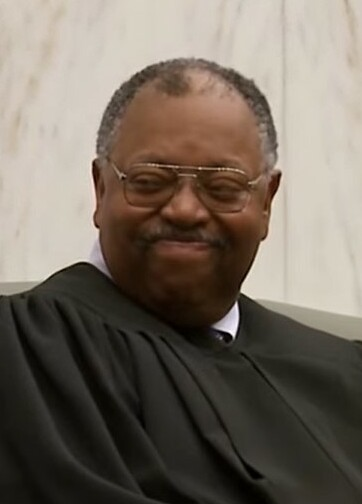
- Kuntz in 2015

Senior Judge of the United States District Court for the Eastern District of New York
- Incumbent
- Assumed office January 1, 2022

Judge of the United States District Court for the Eastern District of New York
- In office October 4, 2011 – January 1, 2022
- Appointed by: Barack Obama
- Preceded by: Nina Gershon
- Succeeded by: Orelia Merchant

Personal details
- Born: William Francis Kuntz II; June 24, 1950 (age 75) New York City, New York, U.S.
- Education: Harvard University (AB, AM, PhD, JD)

William Francis Kuntz II (born June 24, 1950) is a senior United States district judge of the United States District Court for the Eastern District of New York.

== Early life and education ==
Born in New York City, Kuntz graduated from Fordham Preparatory School in 1968, and earned an Artium Baccalaureus in 1972 from Harvard College. He then earned an Artium Magister in 1974 and a Doctor of Philosophy in 1979 from Harvard University and a Juris Doctor in 1977 from Harvard Law School.

== Career ==
From 1978 until 1986, Kuntz was an associate in the New York law firm Shearman & Sterling. From 1986 until 1994, Kuntz was a partner in the New York law firm Milgrim Thomajan Jacobs & Lee, and from 1994 until 2001, Kuntz was a partner in the New York law firm Seward & Kissel. From 2001 until 2004, he was a partner in the New York office of the Canadian law firm Torys LLP, and from 2004 until 2005, he was counsel at the New York law firm Constantine & Cannon. From 2005 until becoming a federal judge, Kuntz was a partner in the New York office of the law firm Baker Hostetler. His specialty is commercial and labor litigation. Prior to his appointment to the EDNY, Kuntz was the New York City Council's designee from Kings County to the Civilian Complaint Review Board from October 1993 through 2010.

=== Federal judicial service ===
On March 9, 2011, President Barack Obama nominated Kuntz to fill a seat on the United States District Court for the Eastern District of New York that became vacant when Judge Nina Gershon took senior status on October 16, 2008. The United States Senate confirmed Kuntz by unanimous consent on October 3, 2011. He received his judicial commission the following day. Kuntz assumed senior status on January 1, 2022.

== Personal ==
Kuntz's wife, Dr. Alice Beal, is the director of palliative care for the New York Harbor Healthcare System Veterans Administration. They live in Brooklyn, New York, where they are members of the parish of the Brooklyn Oratory of St. Boniface. Their son Will is the General Manager of the LA Galaxy, and one daughter, Katharine Meleney is a physician, trained in infectious diseases, and another daughter, Elizabeth, is a librarian.

== See also ==
- List of African-American federal judges
- List of African-American jurists

Legal offices
Preceded by Nina Gershon	Judge of the United States District Court for the Eastern District of New York; 2011–2022	Succeeded by Orelia Merchant
