= Leonard D. Wexler =

American judge (1924–2018)

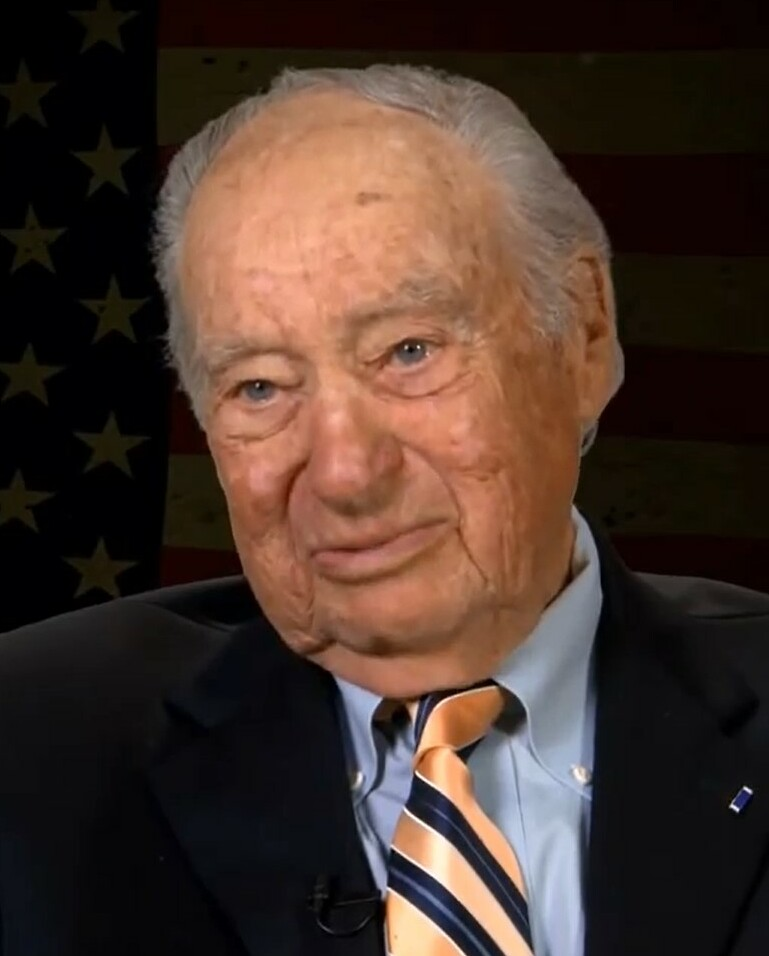
- Wexler in 2014

Senior Judge of the United States District Court for the Eastern District of New York
- In office June 30, 1994 – March 31, 2018

Judge of the United States District Court for the Eastern District of New York
- In office June 22, 1983 – June 30, 1994
- Appointed by: Ronald Reagan
- Preceded by: George C. Pratt
- Succeeded by: Nina Gershon

Personal details
- Born: November 11, 1924 Brooklyn, New York, U.S.
- Died: March 31, 2018 (aged 93)
- Education: Indiana University Bloomington (B.S.); New York University School of Law (J.D.)

Leonard D. Wexler (November 11, 1924 – March 31, 2018) was a United States district judge of the United States District Court for the Eastern District of New York.

== Education and career ==
Born in Brooklyn, New York, Wexler served in the United States Army during World War II from 1943 to 1945, landing in France in August 1944. He served with an anti tank unit and was wounded by shrapnel a few days prior to the Battle of the Bulge. For his service he was awarded two Bronze Stars and a Purple Heart. He received a Bachelor of Science degree from Indiana University Bloomington in 1947. He received a Juris Doctor from New York University School of Law in 1950. He was in private practice of law in Bay Shore, New York, from 1950 to 1956. He was in private practice of law in Smithtown, New York, from 1956 to 1983. He was the administrator of the New York State Assigned Counsel Plan from 1966 to 1983.

== Federal judicial service ==
Wexler was nominated by President Ronald Reagan on May 11, 1983, to a seat on the United States District Court for the Eastern District of New York vacated by Judge George C. Pratt. He was confirmed by the United States Senate on June 22, 1983, and received his commission the same day. He assumed senior status on June 30, 1994, serving in that status until his death on March 31, 2018.

== In his own words ==
In an interview conducted in 2014 and published online on a federal courts website, Wexler described his wartime injury as follows: "I was in a foxhole and bombs were bursting around, but that was usual. There was snow all around, and all of a sudden, one foot feels nice and warm. It was delightful! Of course, I looked down and I’m standing in a puddle of blood. I’d just been hit with shrapnel in my legs, in my left leg. I don’t even know how I ended up in a hospital that we captured in Germany. I guess I collapsed or was unconscious because I don’t know how I got there." When asked why he considered himself lucky to have been wounded, Wexler responded: "Because we were right in the middle of the area of the German breakthrough, the Battle of the Bulge. We lost more men in that offensive than we did in D-Day. The Battle of the Bulge occurred on December 15th. I was hit on December 12th. … Why was I lucky? Imagine being entrenched in an unmovable position with German tanks coming at you and nowhere to get the hell out. I think almost my whole outfit was wiped out. So I was very lucky and thankful that I got hit. It saved my life."

When asked if he liked the phrase "the Greatest generation," Wexler responded: "Yes, I like it. I think it fits. We were the greatest generation. I mean, everybody was united. Everybody stood together. I’ll give you an example. When I got home and I would take the train, a Brooklyn kid, I had a cane, everybody would stand up to give me a seat. Everybody was so nice. I really felt good that we were a great country at one time, united."

Legal offices
Preceded by George C. Pratt	Judge or Senior Judge of the United States District Court for the Eastern District of New York; 1983–2018	Succeeded by Nina Gershon
