= Gregory Paw =

American state official

Gregory Paw served as the Director of the New Jersey Division of Criminal Justice from February 21, 2006 to June 20, 2008. Paw succeeded Vaughn McCoy as Director, and was succeeded as Director by Deborah Gramiccioni, with whom he had worked closely while she was a special assistant to the New Jersey Attorney General. Paw is now a partner in the law firm of Pepper Hamilton, practicing white collar criminal defense and corporate compliance in the firm's Princeton and Philadelphia offices.

== Career ==
While Director Paw oversaw enforcement of New Jersey's criminal laws and was the main link between the department and New Jersey’s law enforcement community. During his term, the Division brought numerous significant cases, including the conviction of the "suitcase killer" (Melanie McGuire), who was sentenced to life imprisonment following her conviction for killing her husband and placing his remains into three suitcases that were thrown into the Chesapeake Bay, and the conviction of a former New Jersey state trooper and a former NHL player in a multimillion-dollar gambling ring. The Division also brought significant corruption cases, including against former state assemblyman and Orange, New Jersey mayor Mims Hackett, and the trial and conviction of the former chief of staff of the New Jersey Commerce Department for official misconduct. Working closely with federal officials, the Division also tried and convicted former state senator and Newark mayor Sharpe James.

Previously, Paw served as the Deputy United States Attorney for the Eastern District of Pennsylvania in Philadelphia. Paw was also deputy chief counsel of the regime crimes liaison office in Baghdad, which advised the new Iraqi government in preparing war crimes cases against deposed Iraqi dictator Saddam Hussein.

Paw was a federal prosecutor for more than ten years, beginning in the Justice Department in Washington, D.C. in 1995; in 1997 Paw moved to Philadelphia. Paw prosecuted political corruption and narcotics cases, including the prosecution of the Majority Leader of the Pennsylvania Senate who hid payments from a business while sponsoring legislation to benefit that business. Paw also prosecuted a Philadelphia Police Department officer who warned a large drug group of pending police raids, and as well as prosecuted a probation officer who extorted bribes from probationers. In 2003, Paw was named by American Lawyer magazine as one of eleven rising stars among federal prosecutors nationwide. In 2005, Paw was named Deputy United States Attorney for the Eastern District of Pennsylvania, the number three post in the office.

Paw served for eleven months, from May 2004 through March 2005, with a team of lawyers sent to Iraq by the Justice Department to help prepare the Iraqi Special Tribunal for the prosecution of Saddam Hussein and other high-ranking members of the former Iraqi regime. Paw supervised a team of American lawyers and investigators reviewing evidence of crimes against humanity and war crimes spanning a 35-year period, and oversaw a $75 million budget. For Paw's work, he received the United States Attorney General’s Special Commendation Award.

Paw graduated from the University of Illinois in 1985 with a degree in news-editorial journalism. He received his law degree from the College of William and Mary in 1988. Paw clerked for United States District Court Judge Walter E. Hoffman in Norfolk, Virginia before joining the Washington, D.C. law firm of Baker and Hostetler in 1989. Paw also served as counsel to a Congressional committee from 1992 to 1993, as well as counsel on an independent counsel investigation from 1993 to 1995.
