= BakerHostetler =

American law firm

- Headquarters: Cleveland, Ohio, U.S.
- No. of offices: 17
- No. of attorneys: 1,000
- Key people: Paul M. Schmidt; Chairman
- Revenue: $732 million (2020)
- Date founded: 1916; 110 years ago
- Founder: Newton D. Baker, Joseph C. Hostetler, Thomas L. Sidlo
- Company type: Limited liability partnership
- Website: www.bakerlaw.com

BakerHostetler is an American law firm founded in 1916. One of the firm's founders, Newton D. Baker, was U.S. Secretary of War during World War I, and former Mayor of Cleveland, Ohio.

== History ==
In 2019, the firm was ranked the 73rd-largest law firm in the world. BakerHostetler is a multidisciplinary firm with six practice groups—Business, Digital Assets and Data Management, Intellectual Property, Labor and Employment, Litigation, and Tax. In a 2020 survey by BTI Consulting Group, BakerHostetler was ranked among the top 30 firms considered to be the “Elite Member of the Client Service A-Team”, in terms of providing superior client satisfaction.

In 2010, BakerHostetler represented Denbury Resources (NYSE: DNR), a member of the S&P 500, in a merger valued at $4.5 billion with Encore Acquisition Co. (NYSE: EAC). The transaction created one of the largest oil-focused independent exploration and production companies in North America. As a result of this and other similar deals, BakerHostetler was ranked among the top 10 U.S. law firms for merger and acquisition deals in the oil, gas, and oilfield service industries for the period January 2009-First Quarter 2010 per The Deal magazine. The firm is generally known for counseling and representing clients in the hospitality, healthcare, financial services, media, energy, sports, and technology fields.

In 2014, intellectual property law firm Woodcock Washburn LLP merged with BakerHostetler, adding three offices in Philadelphia, Atlanta, and Seattle.

In 2016, the firm announced it was using IBM's Watson, named "ROSS", to assist attorneys in their bankruptcy practice. Other law firms had signed agreements with ROSS, but BakerHostetler was the first to announce the use of the artificial intelligence-based service.

In 2020, the firm formed its sixth practice group, the Digital Assets and Data Management Practice group, to address the lifecycle of data. The practice group's formation signaled the importance of "data" to the practice of law and the clients the firm represents.

== Major clients ==
BakerHostetler, through partner Irving Picard and his team, has been overseeing the liquidation of Bernard Madoff’s firm in bankruptcy court, and has so far recovered over $14 billion—about 70 percent of approved claims—by suing those who profited from the scheme, whether they knew of the scheme or not. Kathy Bazoian Phelps, a bankruptcy lawyer at Diamond McCarthy, said "That kind of recovery is extraordinary and atypical," as clawbacks in such schemes range from 5 percent to 30 percent, and many victims receive nothing. Picard has successfully pursued not only investors, but spouses and estates of those who profited, such as the wife of Bernard Madoff (Ruth Madoff), the widow and estate of the deceased Stanley Chais, and the estate of the deceased Jeffry Picower and Picower's widow Barbara, with whom he reached a $7.2 billion settlement (the largest civil forfeiture payment in US history).

BakerHostetler represents the Official Committee of Tort Claimants, the official committee representing the interests of over 70,000 victims of Northern California wildfires in the chapter 11 reorganization of Pacific Gas and Electric Company and PG&E Corporation. PG&E is the largest bankruptcy case ever filed in California and the sixth largest case ever filed in the United States.

Major League Baseball has been a longstanding client of BakerHostetler.

On August 25, 2014, House Republicans hired BakerHostetler's David Rivkin to provide legal representation to sue President Obama over the Affordable Care Act.

BakerHostetler represented Switzerland-based oil trading firm Paramount Energy & Commodities SA. Paramount fired BakerHostetler in May 2023 and subsequently sued the law firm, alleging that partner Jeffrey Berg committed legal malpractice by vouching for Gaurav Srivastava, an Indian businessman who claimed to be a CIA operative. BakerHostetler is then alleged to have committed professional misconduct by refusing to return confidential client files to Paramount.

In 2015, lawyers of the firm acted on behalf of Prevezon, a company linked with relatives of senior Russian officials, and attempted to subpoena Bill Browder into revealing extensive information on his attempts to advance the Magnitsky act.

== Lawyers and locations ==
In 2020, the law firm employed nearly 1000 attorneys and had offices in 17 different markets including: New York City, Washington, D.C., California (Los Angeles, San Francisco, Costa Mesa), Colorado (Denver), Delaware (Wilmington), Florida (Orlando), Georgia (Atlanta), Illinois (Chicago), Pennsylvania (Philadelphia), Texas (Dallas, Houston), Ohio (Columbus, Cleveland, Cincinnati), and Washington (Seattle).

== Notable attorneys ==
- Newton D. Baker
- Steve Dettelbach
- Dennis E. Eckart
- Jack Evans
- Mike Ferguson
- James Halpern
- Jeff Jacoby
- Guy Vander Jagt
- Barbara B. Kennelly
- William Francis Kuntz
- Richard J. Leon
- Betty S. Murphy
- Charles S. Murphy
- Mike Oxley
- Gregory Paw
- Hector Perez
- Irving Picard
- David B. Rivkin
- Peter Shapiro
- Drew B. Tipton
- Mark Tuohey
