= David B. Rivkin =

American lawyer and writer (1956–2024)

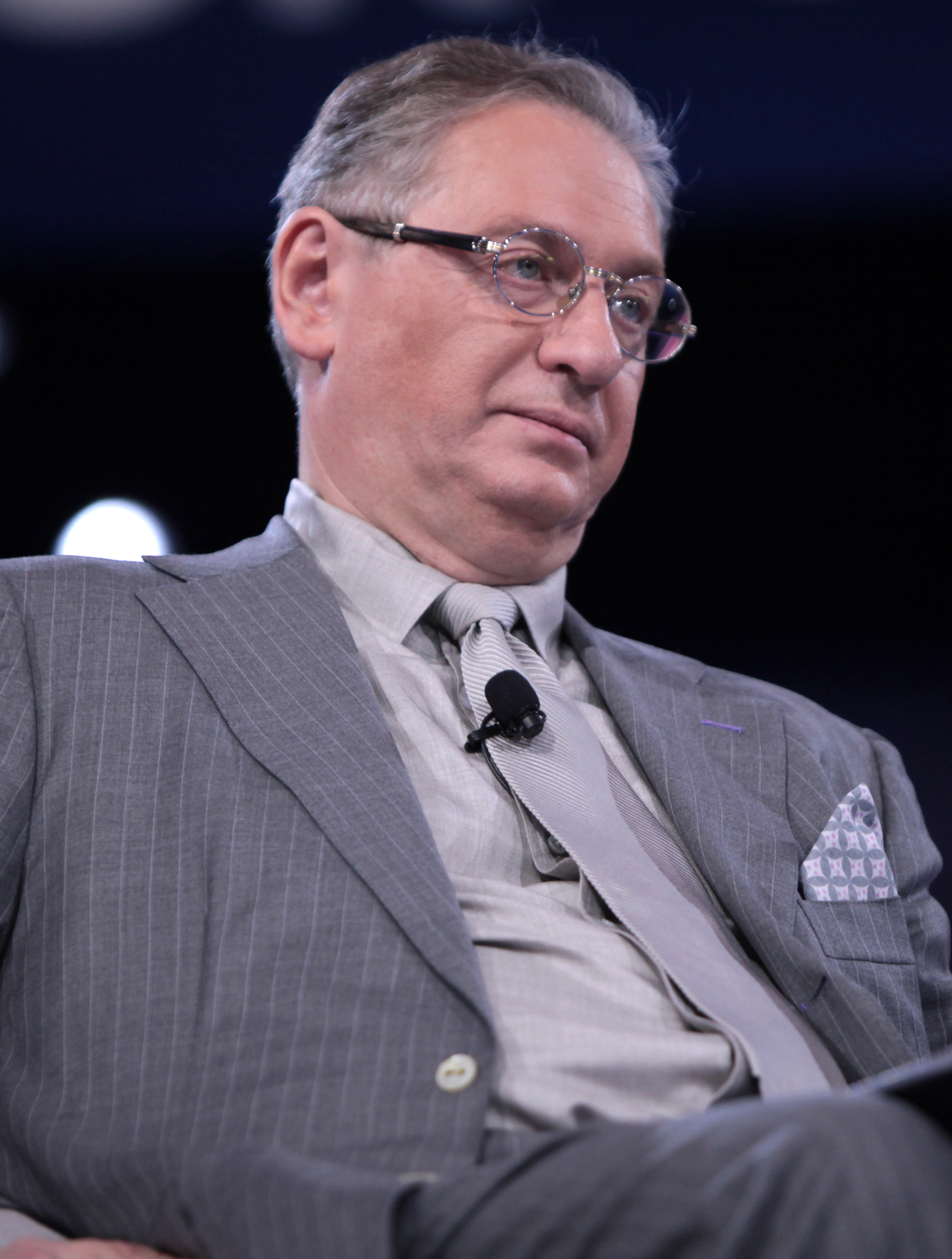
- Rivkin in 2016
- Born: David Borisovich Rivkin; December 15, 1956; Leningrad, Russian SFSR, USSR
- Died: December 27, 2024 (aged 68)
- Citizenship: United States
- Education: Georgetown University (BS, MA); Columbia University (JD)
- Occupations: Lawyer; writer; political analyst
- Employer: Baker Hostetler
- Known for: Conservative viewpoint, constitutional and international law expertise
- Political party: Republican
- Board member of: Co-chair Center for Law and Counterterrorism at the Foundation for Defense of Democracies
- Awards: 2011 Burton Awards: 2011 Legal Writing Award Winner
- Website: http://www.davidbrivkin.com

David Boris Rivkin Jr. (December 15, 1956 – December 27, 2024) was an American attorney, political writer, and conservative media commentator on matters of constitutional and international law, as well as foreign and defense policy. Rivkin gained national recognition as a representative of conservative viewpoints, frequently testifying before congressional committees, and appearing as an analyst and commentator on a variety of television and radio stations. He was a visiting fellow at the Center for the National Interest, and a recipient of the U.S. Naval Proceedings Annual Alfred Thayer Mahan Award for the best maritime affairs article. He was a fellow at the Foundation for Defense of Democracies, and was a member of the Sub-Commission on the Promotion and Protection of Human Rights of the United Nations Commission on Human Rights.

Rivkin was a U.S. government official, having served under Presidents Ronald Reagan and George H. W. Bush. In 2010, Rivkin took on his highest-profile case to date when he agreed to represent a multi-state lawsuit, consisting of 26 state attorneys general against health care reform legislation signed into law by President Barack Obama in March. The lawsuit, filed in the Federal Court's Northern District of Florida, argued the legislation was an "illegal expansion of Congress' regulation of interstate commerce and unfairly penalizes uninsured people who refuse to buy into the program". Rivkin represented former Defense Secretary Donald Rumsfeld in a lawsuit by José Padilla, who said he was tortured while in custody; he also helped "craft legal strategy for the State of Texas as it fights federal proposals on health care and environmental regulation".

In May 2011, Rivkin was awarded a Burton Award for Legal Achievement for a Washington Post article he wrote with Lee A. Casey in February 2010 titled "Why the 'Don't ask, don't tell' policy is doomed".

== Early life and education ==
Rivkin was born in a Jewish family in the former Soviet Union, and lived there during the first decade of his life. In 2004, he stated that he knew what it must have been like to live under the rule of Saddam Hussein in Iraq:

I grew up in the Soviet Union, where the individual's interests were always subordinated to the whims of the state, and where the government was the law. Even so, my parents and grandparents endured much worse. They lived in Stalin's Russia, and they knew real fear—not just occasionally, but every day—fear of the state and its agents. Indeed, many people during that era did not sleep well at night, waiting for the knock at the door, announcing that the security police had come to pick them up and cart them off to the Gulag, or be shot.

After moving to the United States with his family, Rivkin earned a Bachelor of Science degree from the Edmund A. Walsh School of Foreign Service at Georgetown University, and a Master of Arts degree in Soviet Affairs with high honors also from Georgetown University. In 1985, he received a Juris Doctor degree from Columbia Law School.

== Career ==
=== U.S. federal government ===
Rivkin held a variety of legal and policy positions throughout the administrations of Republican Presidents Ronald Reagan and George H. W. Bush. He served as Legal Advisor to the Counsel to then President Reagan and as deputy director of the Office of Policy Development (OPD) for the United States Department of Justice. While at OPD, he worked on a wide variety of constitutional, domestic, and international issues, including judicial selection, legal policy, immigration and asylum matters, and intelligence oversight. He also handled the development and implementation of President Bush's de-regulatory initiatives, carried out from 1991 to 1992, which focused on a review of existing federal structures in an attempt to make them more cost-effective.

From 1990 to 1991, Rivkin was the Associate General Counsel of the United States Department of Energy. In this post he was responsible for developing and implementing national and international environmental and energy strategies. He also helped in the passing of the Clean Air Act (1990) and FERC Order 636, known as the Restructuring Rule, designed to allow more efficient use of the interstate natural gas transmission system by fundamentally changing the way pipeline companies conduct business. During his term, national energy markets were deregulated.

=== Legal career ===
After serving as a legal clerk and associate for several law firms, Rivkin joined Hunton & Williams and was promoted to partner. There his practice concentrated on international public law and litigation before the International Court of Justice and on policy advocacy on a wide range of international and domestic issues, including treaty implementation, multilateral and unilateral sanctions, corporate law, environmental policy, and energy issues. Rivkin left the firm in December 1999 to join Baker Hostetler, where he was a partner in the Washington, D.C. office. Rivkin represented foreign governments and corporate entities on legal, political, economic, military, and public relations matters and worked on bilateral and multilateral foreign policy issues with Congress and various Executive Branch entities. Rivkin was also a member of the District of Columbia Bar and the Council on Foreign Relations.

==== Florida v. U.S. Department of Health and Human Services ====
Rivkin became lead outside counsel in the lawsuit filed by multiple state attorneys general seeking to nullify the Patient Protection and Affordable Care Act. The lawsuit was filed on March 23, 2010, hours after the law was signed by President Barack Obama, in United States District Court for the Northern District of Florida in Pensacola. In a Wall Street Journal opinion article, Rivkin called the law "in its design, the most profoundly unconstitutional statute in American history; in its execution, one of the most incompetent ones".

On January 31, 2011, Federal Judge Roger Vinson ruled in favor of the 26 state plaintiffs in the case and found the individual mandate unconstitutional. But, unlike the December ruling from a federal judge in Virginia, Vinson ruled that because there was no severability clause in the original legislation, the entire law must be declared void; "The act, like a defectively designed watch, needs to be redesigned and reconstructed by the watchmaker", he wrote in the decision.

Rivkin immediately told media that the ruling meant the 26 states challenging the law must halt implementation of pieces that apply to the state plaintiffs and certain small businesses, since the National Federation of Independent Businesses was also involved in the suit; but the federal government said it would continue to implement the law and appeal the case. This ruling was later overturned by the U.S. Supreme Court in National Federation of Independent Business v. Sebelius.

Following this success, Rivkin's representation sent out a press release claiming to be the victim of a denial of service "cyberattack".

=== Congressional hearings ===
Rivkin testified numerous times before the U.S. Congress on such matters as the judicial nomination of Justice Sotomayor, the consequences of prolonged detention at Guantanamo Bay detention camp, and the clemency controversy surrounding Lewis ("Scooter") Libby's 2007 conviction on obstruction of justice.

=== Media appearances ===
Rivkin appeared as a guest analyst on TV and radio programs, including CNN, MSNBC, NBC, ABC, CBS, FOX News, NPR, PBS, The Laura Ingraham Show, Al Jazeera, the BBC, and others.

=== Writing and publications ===
Rivkin authored or co-authored more than 360 papers, articles, op-eds, book reviews, and book chapters on issues such as international relations, legal matters, constitutional debates, national defense, foreign policy, and environmental and energy policy. During the late 1980s, he addressed the Iran–Contra affair. After the election of Bill Clinton, Rivkin wrote concerning healthcare reform and the Constitution.

Media and periodicals that have published Rivkin's works include The Wall Street Journal, the National Review, The Washington Post, The New York Times, The Washington Times, The Heritage Foundation, and the Harvard Journal of Law and Public Policy.

During the war on terrorism, which began after the September 11, 2001 attacks, Rivkin wrote articles on the international law of armed conflict with which the issues of jus ad bellum, also known as the accepted laws of war for which the Geneva Convention are often associated. Other recent topics include the use of military commissions, presidential powers during wartime, civil litigation for Guantánamo Bay detainees, and global warming.

Rivkin and his frequent coauthor, Lee Casey, questioned the constitutionality of government-run healthcare. First raising the issue of privacy, Rivkin went on to question the constitutionality of Congressional legislation requiring all U.S. citizens to purchase health insurance. In December 2009, Rivkin and Casey raised the issues of federal aggrandizement and judicial aggrandizement as dangers to the vertical separation of powers in the U.S. Constitution, and suggested a limited constitutional convention to limit the incursion of federal and judicial powers into the powers of the states.

In a May 12, 2011, editorial in The Wall Street Journal, Rivkin addressed the runaway national debt problem by calling on Congress to reclaim its responsibility for issuing new U.S. debt: "Congress should promptly increase the debt ceiling, but with one key caveat: The increase can be used only for borrowing to service existing obligations".

=== International law and terrorism ===
Rivkin spoke out frequently against Attorney General Eric Holder and the Justice Department's handling of terrorist suspects such as José Padilla, arguing that "trying them in federal civilian court is a mistake on many levels" and that "if the 'law of war' architecture is undermined here, U.S. forces and civilian officials will be exposed to criminal liability for their use of force [in other countries]".

In March 2011, Rivkin wrote in several editorials that, according to the U.S. Constitution, President Barack Obama did not need approval from Congress to launch attacks in Libya, writing that these "essentially punitive operations now underway against Muammar Gaddafi would not have required a declaration of war at the time the Constitution was adopted, and do not require such action today".

Rivkin represented Colombian businessman Alex Saab, detained in 2020 during a fuel stop in Cape Verde and extradited to the United States, where he was charged with money laundering of hundreds of millions of US dollars.

== Death ==
Rivkin died on December 27, 2024, at the age of 68.
