= Tax Anti-Injunction Act =

United States law

The Tax Anti-Injunction Act, currently codified at 26 U.S.C. § 7421, is a United States federal law originally enacted in 1867. The statute provides that with 14 specified exceptions, "no suit for the purpose of restraining the assessment or collection of any tax shall be maintained in any court by any person, whether or not such person is the person against whom such tax was assessed".

== History ==
The Anti-Injunction Act was originally enacted as Pub. L. 39–169, 14 Stat. 475, enacted March 2, 1867, § 10. The modern equivalent was enacted on August 16, 1954, as section 7421(a) of the Internal Revenue Code of 1954 (now the 1986 Code).

== Analysis ==
This rule is related to the Flora full payment rule, based in part on the United States Supreme Court decision in Flora v. United States, essentially requiring that in most cases a person resisting the assessment of a U.S. federal tax must first pay the full amount of tax asserted by the Internal Revenue Service (IRS) and then file a formal administrative claim for refund with the IRS.

As a general rule, the courts will not entertain a suit to enjoin (or stop) the government from assessing the tax but will entertain a suit for a tax refund after the IRS has denied the refund claim, or 6 months have elapsed (120 days in bankruptcy cases) since the filing of the claim, whichever is earlier.

For the exception allowing litigation without first paying the tax in bankruptcy cases, see 11 U.S.C. § 505. For income taxes and certain other taxes, the taxpayer may also litigate the tax in the United States Tax Court prior to assessment without first paying the tax.

== Impact ==
In the case of National Federation of Independent Business v. Sebelius, in which the constitutionality of the Patient Protection and Affordable Care Act was at issue, the U.S. Supreme Court upheld the constitutionality of the mandate imposed under that law. The Court also determined the applicability of the Tax Anti-Injunction Act to the litigation over the law. The Court held that the individual mandate in that statute (codified in Internal Revenue Code section 5000A as a "penalty") does not fall under the Tax Anti-Injunction Act, on the rationale that Congress specifically labeled consequences of the mandate as a "penalty" rather than a "tax", whereas other portions of the Act were labeled as a "tax". The Court also ruled that the nature of the mandate does not preclude the federal courts from hearing the case before a prospective plaintiff has paid such a penalty to the Internal Revenue Service in the year 2015. In this case, the mandate was ruled to be constitutional as a valid exercise of the congressional taxing power.
