= National Federation of Independent Business v. Sebelius =

- Supreme Court of the United States

Argued March 26–28, 2012 Decided June 28, 2012
- Full case name: National Federation of Independent Business, et al. v. Kathleen Sebelius, Secretary of Health and Human Services, et al.; Department of Health and Human Services, et al. v. Florida, et al.; Florida, et al. v. United States Department of Health and Human Services, et al.
- Docket nos.: 11-393; 11-398; 11-400
- Citations: 567 U.S. 519 (more) 132 S. Ct. 2566; 183 L. Ed. 2d 450; 2012 U.S. LEXIS 4876; 80 U.S.L.W. 4579; 2012-2 U.S. Tax Cas. (CCH) ¶ 50,423; 109 A.F.T.R.2d (RIA) 2563; 53 Employee Benefits Cas. (BNA) 1513; 23 Fla. L. Weekly Fed. S 480
- Argument: Anti-Injunction Act; Individual Mandate; Severability; Medicaid Expansion
- Decision: Opinion

Case history
- Prior: Act declared unconstitutional sub. nom. Florida ex rel. Bondi v. US Dept. of Health and Human Services, 780 F. Supp. 2d 1256 (N.D. Fla. 2011); affirmed and reversed in parts, 648 F.3d 1235 (11th Cir. 2011); cert. granted, 565 U.S. 1033 (2011), 565 U.S. 1034 (2011).

Holding
- (1) The Tax Anti-Injunction Act does not apply because the Patient Protection and Affordable Care Act (ACA)'s labeling of the individual mandate as a "penalty" instead of a "tax" precludes it from being treated as a tax under the Anti-Injunction Act. (2) The individual mandate constitutionally functions as a tax, so it is valid exercise of Congress's taxing power. (3) Congress exceeded its Spending Clause authority by coercing states into expanding Medicaid by threatening to revoke all federal Medicaid funding.

Court membership
- Chief Justice John Roberts Associate Justices Antonin Scalia · Anthony Kennedy; Clarence Thomas · Ruth Bader Ginsburg; Stephen Breyer · Samuel Alito; Sonia Sotomayor · Elena Kagan

Case opinions
- Majority: Roberts (Parts I, II, and III–C), joined by Ginsburg, Breyer, Sotomayor, Kagan
- Plurality: Roberts (Part IV), joined by Breyer, Kagan
- Plurality: Roberts (Parts III–A, III–B, and III–D)
- Concur/dissent: Ginsburg, joined by Sotomayor; Breyer, Kagan (Parts I, II, III, and IV)
- Dissent: Scalia, Kennedy, Thomas, Alito
- Dissent: Thomas

Laws applied
- U.S. Const. art. I; 124 Stat. 119–1025 (Affordable Care Act), Tax Anti-Injunction Act

National Federation of Independent Business v. Sebelius, 567 U.S. 519 (2012), is a landmark United States Supreme Court decision in which the Court upheld Congress's power to enact most provisions of the Affordable Care Act (ACA), commonly called Obamacare, and the Health Care and Education Reconciliation Act of 2010 (HCERA), including a requirement for most Americans to pay a penalty for forgoing health insurance by 2014. The Acts represented a major set of changes to the American health care system that had been the subject of highly contentious debate, largely divided on political party lines.

The Supreme Court, in an opinion written by Chief Justice John Roberts, upheld by a vote of 5–4 the individual mandate to buy health insurance as a constitutional exercise of Congress's power under the Taxing and Spending Clause (taxing power).

A majority of the justices, including Roberts, agreed that the individual mandate was not a proper use of Congress's Commerce Clause or Necessary and Proper Clause powers, although they did not join in a single opinion.

A majority of the justices also agreed that another challenged provision of the Act, a significant expansion of Medicaid, was not a valid exercise of Congress's spending power, as it would coerce states to either accept the expansion or risk losing existing Medicaid funding.

== Background ==
In March 2010, President Barack Obama signed the Patient Protection and Affordable Care Act into law. A number of parties sued, including the National Federation of Independent Business, claiming that the sweeping reform law was unconstitutional for various reasons. The Supreme Court granted certiorari to three cases, totaling 5½ hours of oral arguments: National Federation of Independent Business v. Sebelius (which consolidated a part of Florida v. Dept. of Health and Human Services) on the issues of the constitutionality of the individual mandate and the severability of any unconstitutional provisions, Dept. of Health and Human Services v. Florida on the issue of whether review was barred by the Anti-Injunction Act, and Florida v. Dept. of Health and Human Services on the matter of the constitutionality of the Medicaid expansion.

=== District Court proceedings ===
On behalf of the state of Florida, Florida Attorney General Pam Bondi sued the United States Department of Health and Human Services, challenging the law's constitutionality. On January 31, 2011, Judge Roger Vinson ruled that the mandatory health insurance "individual mandate"—the provision of Internal Revenue Code section 5000A imposing a "shared responsibility penalty" on nearly all Americans who fail to purchase health insurance—was outside the power of Congress. Vinson also held that the mandate could not be severed from the rest of the Affordable Care Act and struck down the entire act.

=== Eleventh Circuit appeal ===
Lawsuits Original litigants (March 2010) Joined January 2011 Virginia and Oklahoma, also highlighted, were involved in similar lawsuits.

The Department of Health and Human Services appealed to the 11th Circuit Court of Appeals. A three-judge panel issued a 2–1 ruling affirming Vinson's findings in part and reversing in part. The court affirmed the District Court's holding that the individual mandate was unconstitutional, but, contrary to the District Court's view, it held that the individual mandate could be severed, leaving the rest of the law intact. The government decided to not seek en banc review from the full Circuit and instead petitioned the United States Supreme Court to review the Eleventh Circuit's rulings.

=== Related cases ===
Other federal courts heard cases related to the Affordable Care Act that were not directly reviewed by the Supreme Court, but caused a divide regarding the law's constitutionality. Two federal judges appointed by President Bill Clinton upheld the individual mandate in 2010. Judge Jeffrey Sutton, a member of the Sixth Circuit Court of Appeals appointed by George W. Bush, was the first Republican-appointed judge to rule that the law is constitutional in June 2011, as part of a divided three-judge panel that upheld the law.

== Briefings and oral arguments ==
On November 14, 2011, the Supreme Court granted certiorari to portions of three cross-appeals of the Eleventh Circuit's opinion: one by the states (Florida v. U.S. Dept. of Health and Human Svcs.), one by the federal government (U.S. Dept. of Health and Human Svcs. v. Florida), and one by the National Federation of Independent Business (Nat'l Fed. of Independent Bus. v. Sebelius).

=== Oral arguments ===
The Court announced in December 2011 that it would hear approximately six hours of oral argumentation over a three-day period, from March 26 to March 28, 2012, covering the various aspects being questioned by the principal parties involved in this and other related cases concerning the ACA.

The court first heard argument on whether the Anti-Injunction Act, which limits suits "for the purpose of restraining the assessment or collection of any tax", barred a decision before the ACA fully entered into force in 2014. Since neither the government, represented by Solicitor General Donald Verrilli, nor the states, represented that day by Gregory G. Katsas of the law firm Jones Day, were willing to defend that position (which had been accepted by three of the 12 appellate court judges who heard the cases), the Court appointed Robert Long of the law firm Covington & Burling as amicus curiae to defend that position.

On the second day, the court heard arguments over whether the ACA's "individual mandate" fell under the constitutional powers of Congress. The states (Florida et al.) were represented during the hearings by former Bush administration Solicitor General Paul Clement while the government was represented by current Solicitor General Donald Verrilli. Tom Goldstein of SCOTUSblog, while acknowledging that Verrilli had an initial stumble, called Verrilli's performance "tremendous", but also said that Clement's performance was "the best argument I've ever heard".

On the morning of the third day, the Court considered the issue of severability—whether the ACA could survive if the Court struck down the individual mandate. Paul Clement, Deputy Solicitor General Edwin Kneedler, and Court-appointed amicus curiae H. Bartow Farr, III of the law firm Farr & Taranto argued their various positions before the Court.

On the afternoon of the third day, the Court considered whether the Medicaid expansion the ACA instituted was coercive. Both Clement and Verrilli again argued before the Court. Chief Justice Roberts extended the time limit for both parties by 15 minutes during the arguments.

Verrilli's performance during the hearings was widely criticized by analysts.

== Outcome ==
Question	Ginsburg	Sotomayor	Kagan	Breyer	Roberts	Kennedy	Alito	Scalia	Thomas
The Commerce Clause does not empower Congress to legislate the individual mandate.	No	No	No	No	Yes	Yes	Yes	Yes	Yes
The ACA's threat to withdraw all Medicaid support to the states is unconstitutionally coercive.	No	No	Yes	Yes	Yes	Yes	Yes	Yes	Yes
The Tax Anti-Injunction Act does not apply to the ACA.	Yes	Yes	Yes	Yes	Yes	Yes	Yes	Yes	Yes
Absent the threat to withdraw Medicaid support, the Medicaid expansion remains permissible.	Yes	Yes	Yes	Yes	Yes	No	No	No	No
The Taxing and Spending Clause empowers Congress to legislate the individual mandate.	Yes	Yes	Yes	Yes	Yes	No	No	No	No

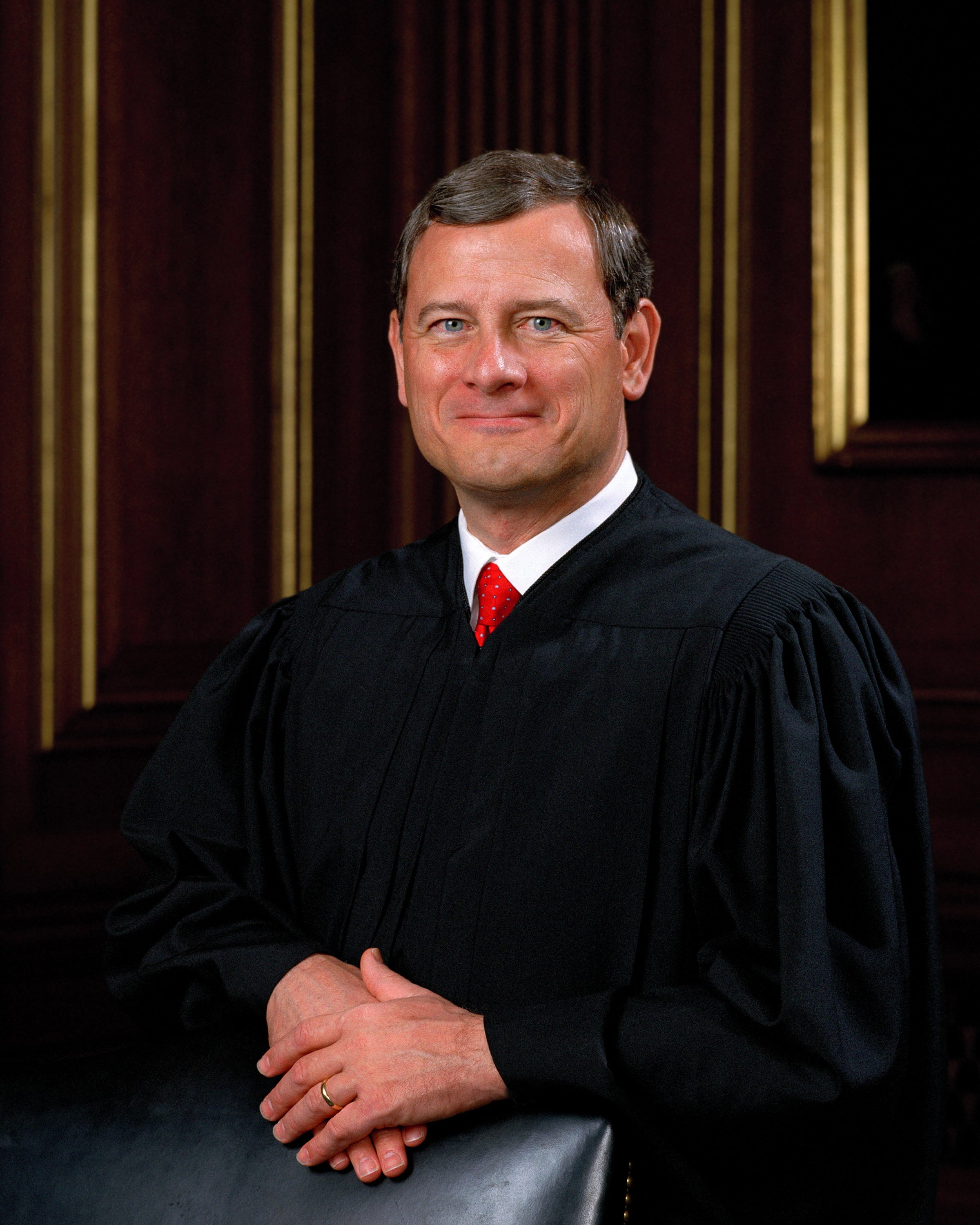
Chief Justice John Roberts wrote the majority opinion upholding the Affordable Care Act but overturning one section as exceeding Congress's spending authority.

The case generated a complex division on the bench. With respect to the Tax Anti-Injunction Act and individual mandate penalty, judgment was for the U.S. Secretary of Health and Human Services. With respect to the Medicaid expansion, judgment was for the challenging states.

All the justices were in rough agreement that the Anti-Injunction Act did not apply. Five justices (Roberts, Ginsburg, Breyer, Sotomayor, and Kagan) joined an opinion as to this.

One combination of five justices (Roberts, Scalia, Kennedy, Thomas, and Alito) were of the opinion that the individual mandate was not within the scope of Congress's Commerce Clause or its Necessary and Proper Clause powers. As four of them did not concur in the judgment, their votes could not count toward a controlling opinion.

A separate combination of five justices (Roberts, Ginsburg, Breyer, Sotomayor, and Kagan) held the individual mandate was a valid exercise of Congress's taxing power. As these five justices concurred in judgment and agreed to the same parts of Roberts's opinion, this was the binding and controlling majority as to this aspect of the case. As the individual mandate was upheld, the issue of its severability from the rest of the Affordable Care Act was not reached.

A final combination of seven justices (Roberts, Scalia, Kennedy, Thomas, Breyer, Alito, and Kagan) concurred in judgment that the Medicaid expansion of the Affordable Care Act, in combination with existing statutes, amounted to an unconstitutionally coercive use of Congress's spending power; however, those seven justices were divided as to the appropriate legal remedy.

=== Opinion of the Court ===
Roberts authored an opinion, of which three parts gained the assent of five justices (Roberts, Ginsburg, Breyer, Sotomayor, and Kagan) and became the opinion of the Court, and one part gained the assent of a plurality (Roberts, Breyer, and Kagan) and became part of the holding. Those parts of Roberts's opinion that gained the assent of five justices were Parts I, II, and III-C. Part I recounted the facts and procedural history of the cases. Part II concerned the applicability of the Anti-Injunction Act to the individual mandate penalty. Part III-C held that, for constitutional purposes, the individual mandate penalty was a valid exercise of Congress's taxing power.

==== Tax Anti-Injunction Act ====
The Anti-Injunction Act prohibits federal courts from enjoining agencies of the federal government from collecting a tax while a challenge to the tax is pending. Congress's motivation in passing the act was to prevent the starvation of the federal treasury while tax issues are being litigated before the courts. Instead, Congress requires a taxpayer who challenges any tax to first pay that tax, and only afterwards is the taxpayer allowed to bring suit and seek a refund. Challengers of the Affordable Care Act maintained that the individual mandate's enforcement mechanism was not a tax. The Court agreed. Because the ACA calls the individual mandate's shared responsibility payment a "penalty" instead of a "tax", it prevents the penalty from being treated as a tax under the Anti-Injunction Act.

==== Congress's taxing power ====
Taking a functional view to the individual mandate penalty, the Court held that it was a tax for constitutional purposes. The Court noted that the label of the individual mandate shared responsibility payment as a penalty for the purposes of the Anti-Injunction Act did not control whether it was a tax for purposes of constitutional analysis. The Court asserted that the individual mandate penalty, in practical operation, exhibited all the characteristics of a tax—the penalty "looks like a tax in many respects." That is, the individual mandate penalty had all of the following features of a tax:

1. payment went to the U.S. Treasury when taxpayers filed their tax returns;
2. the amount of the penalty was determined by factors such as the individual's taxable income, number of dependents, and joint filing status;
3. the penalty was found in the Internal Revenue Code, and enforced by the Internal Revenue Service in the same manner as taxes are collected; and
4. the penalty produced "some revenue" for the government.

Neither did the penalty's operation as a tax run afoul of even "our narrowest interpretations of the taxing power", which disallows punitive taxation:

1. the upper limit of the penalty was not so high as to become coercive since it was capped by statute to never be more than the cost of obtaining insurance;
2. the penalty had no scienter element typical of punitive statutes; and
3. while the penalty was collected by the IRS, any failure to pay the penalty would not result in criminal prosecution.

Moreover, adhering to prior precedent, the Court reasoned the tax imposed by the individual mandate penalty is not a direct tax (i.e., it is not a capitation or poll tax, nor a tax on real estate) and consequently does not require apportionment: "[a] tax on going without health insurance does not fall within any recognized category of direct tax. ... The shared responsibility payment is thus not a direct tax that must be apportioned among the several States." Even where one views an individual's decision to self-insure as economic inactivity, the safety that such an omission to act provides from Congress's commerce power does not similarly apply to taxation. The Court provided three reasons that Congress's use of its taxing power in this manner was not troubling:

1. the Constitution makes no promise of avoiding taxation via inactivity;
2. Congress's use of the taxing power to influence conduct is not unlimited; and,
3. while Congress's taxing power is broader in scope than its commerce power, the authority the taxing power grants Congress over individual behavior is not as extensive.

As Roberts concluded for the Court:

The Affordable Care Act's requirement that certain individuals pay a financial penalty for not obtaining health insurance may reasonably be characterized as a tax. Because the Constitution permits such a tax, it is not our role to forbid it, or to pass upon its wisdom or fairness.

=== Plurality holding ===
As stated above, seven justices agreed in judgment for the states against the Department of Health and Human Services on the issue of the Medicaid expansion, but no opinion among them obtained the assent of five justices. At issue were amendments to the Social Security Act contained in Title X of the Affordable Care Act. These amendments, in expanding Medicaid coverage, made changes to the plan requirements states must meet in their Medicaid plans. The 1965 amendments to the Social Security Act that created Medicaid authorized the Secretary of Health and Human Services to withhold federal payments to state Medicaid plans that were not in compliance with statutory requirements.

The seven justices were in agreement that the Secretary's existing ability to withhold all funds from noncompliant plans, coupled with the substantial coverage changes enacted by the Title X amendments, amounted to an unconstitutionally coercive use of Congress's spending power, given that Congress was not going to cover the full cost of the Medicaid expansion after 2016. Where the justices differed was in what they thought constituted the appropriate remedy.

Four (Scalia, Kennedy, Thomas, and Alito) believed the Title X amendments should be struck down due to their impermissibly coercive nature. The remaining three (Roberts, Breyer, and Kagan) instead opted to exercise the existing severability clause (codified at 42 USC §1303) in the Social Security Act, as amended, holding that the ability given to the Secretary by statute to withhold federal payments could not be applied to the Title X amendments for those states refusing to participate in the Medicaid expansion.

Since this latter opinion concurred in the judgment on the narrowest ground (i.e., severing only part of the application of the law instead of striking all of the amendments), the three-justice plurality became the controlling opinion under the rule set out by Marks v. United States (1977).

== Other opinions ==
=== Roberts's opinion ===
Writing only for himself, Roberts would hold that the individual mandate penalty exceeded both Congress's commerce power and its Necessary and Proper Clause power. In part III-A of his opinion, he argued that Congress's authority under the Commerce Clause necessarily presupposes activity already exists for Congress to regulate, but the individual mandate seeks to compel activity in order to then regulate it. Such compulsion represents a "new and potentially vast domain to congressional authority" well beyond even the "most far reaching" extent of authority allowed under the precedent of Wickard v. Filburn. In Roberts's view, such a view of the commerce power would fundamentally change the relationship between the federal government and the individual; while Congress may anticipate the effects of activity on commerce, it has never been allowed to anticipate economic activity by those not engaging in commercial acts. "The Commerce Clause is not a general license to regulate an individual from cradle to grave, simply because he will predictably engage in particular transactions."

Nor could the Necessary and Proper Clause, in Roberts's view, support the individual mandate penalty. While authorizing Congress to enact laws incidental to powers enumerated in the Constitution, its authority is not a grant of any substantive and independent power. The individual mandate penalty represented an attempt by Congress to reach and draw in individuals beyond the scope of its authority; while the penalty may be necessary to Congress's ends, it is not a proper means of reaching it.

In part III-B of his opinion, Roberts argued that the failure to uphold the individual mandate penalty under those two clauses did not end the inquiry. He referred to canons of judicial interpretation, particularly the canon of beneficial interpretation: where a law "has two possible meanings, one of which violates the Constitution, courts should adopt the meaning that does not do so." Thus, if the individual mandate penalty payment can be read as a tax, then it may fall within Congress's taxing authority.

=== Justice Ginsburg's concurrence/dissent ===
Justice Ginsburg concurred in the judgment in part and dissented in part. Joined by Breyer, Sotomayor, and Kagan, she would have upheld the individual mandate under the Commerce Clause and Necessary and Proper Clause:

Congress had a rational basis for concluding that the uninsured, as a class, substantially affect interstate commerce. Those without insurance consume billions of dollars of health-care products and services each year. Those goods are produced, sold, and delivered largely by national and regional companies who routinely transact business across state lines. The uninsured also cross state lines to receive care.

Further, joined only by Sotomayor, she dissented on striking down the Medicaid expansion penalty, arguing that it was within Congress's power under the Spending Clause:

At bottom, my colleagues' position is that the States' reliance on federal funds limits Congress's authority to alter its spending programs. This gets things backwards: Congress, not the States, is tasked with spending federal money in service of the general welfare. And each successive Congress is empowered to appropriate funds as it sees fit. When the 110th Congress reached a conclusion about Medicaid funds that differed from its predecessors' view, it abridged no State's right to "existing", or "pre-existing", funds. ... For, in fact, there are no such funds. There is only money States anticipate receiving from future Congresses.

Ginsburg's dissent went on to highlight the implications of the majority's finding that the federal government's threat of taking away existing funding from states unwilling to implement Medicaid expansion left states with no "legitimate choice".

When future Spending Clause challenges arrive, as they likely will in the wake of today's decision, how will litigants and judges assess whether "a State has a legitimate choice whether to accept the federal conditions in exchange for federal funds"? Are courts to measure the number of dollars the Federal Government might withhold for noncompliance? The portion of the State's budget at stake? And which State's—or States'—budget is determinative: the lead plaintiff, all challenging States (26 in this case, many with quite different fiscal situations), or some national median?

=== Joint dissent ===
Justices Scalia, Kennedy, Thomas, and Alito joined an unsigned dissent that argued the individual mandate was unconstitutional because it represented an attempt by Congress to regulate beyond its power under the Commerce Clause. Further, they argued that reclassifying the individual mandate as a tax rather than a penalty in order to sustain its constitutionality was not to interpret the statute but to rewrite it, which they deemed a troubling exercise of judicial power:

In answering that question [whether the individual mandate is independently authorized by Congress's taxing power] we must, if "fairly possible", Crowell v. Benson, 285 U. S. 22, 62 (1932), construe the provision to be a tax rather than a mandate-with-penalty, since that would render it constitutional rather than unconstitutional (ut res magis valeat quam pereat). But we cannot rewrite the statute to be what it is not. "'[A]lthough this Court will often strain to construe legislation so as to save it against constitutional attack, it must not and will not carry this to the point of perverting the purpose of a statute ... ' or judicially rewriting it." Commodity Futures Trading Comm'n v. Schor, 478 U. S. 833, 841 (1986) (quoting Aptheker v. Secretary of State, 378 U. S. 500, 515 (1964), in turn quoting Scales v. United States, 367 U. S. 203, 211 (1961)). In this case, there is simply no way, "without doing violence to the fair meaning of the words used", Grenada County Supervisors v. Brogden, 112 U. S. 261, 269 (1884), to escape what Congress enacted: a mandate that individuals maintain minimum essential coverage, enforced by a penalty.

The dissent also disputed Ginsburg's claim that the court's opinion failed "to explain why the individual mandate threatens our constitutional order":

[The individual mandate] threatens that order because it gives such an expansive meaning to the Commerce Clause that all private conduct (including failure to act) becomes subject to federal control, effectively destroying the Constitution's division of governmental powers. Thus the dissent, on the theories proposed for the validity of the Mandate, would alter the accepted constitutional relation between the individual and the National Government. The dissent protests that the Necessary and Proper Clause has been held to include "the power to enact criminal laws, ... the power to imprison, ... and the power to create a national bank", ante, at 34–35. Is not the power to compel purchase of health insurance much lesser? No, not if (unlike those other dispositions) its application rests upon a theory that everything is within federal control simply because it exists.

Finally, the joint dissent argued that since the ACA exceeded its constitutional powers in both compelling the purchase of health insurance and in denying non-consenting States Medicaid funding, the whole statute should have been deemed inoperative because the two parts were central to the statute's design and operation. The joint dissent mentioned that "the Constitution requires tax increases to originate in the House of Representatives" per the Origination Clause, though that issue was not addressed by the majority opinion.

=== Justice Thomas's dissent ===
In a one-paragraph dissent, Justice Thomas emphasized his long-held belief that the Supreme Court's precedents have broadened Congress's powers under the Commerce Clause in a manner "inconsistent with the original understanding of Congress's powers and with this Court's early Commerce Clause cases". Thomas wrote that he agreed with Roberts's interpretation of precedents allowing Congress to use the Commerce Clause to regulate "the channels of interstate commerce" and the "persons or things in interstate commerce" and disallowing the regulation of commercial inactivity. But he disagreed with the court's third, "substantial effects" test as established by Wickard v. Filburn, articulated within United States v. Morrison, and strengthened by Gonzales v. Raich.

== Reaction and commentary ==
=== Media coverage ===
The Court convened on the morning of June 28, 2012, to announce its decisions on the ACA and two other cases; it announced its ruling on the ACA shortly after 10:00 am EDT. CNN and Fox News initially reported that the individual mandate was found unconstitutional, but corrected themselves within minutes. President Obama initially heard from CNN and Fox News that the mandate had been found unconstitutional, but then heard the correct information shortly thereafter.

=== Speculation over Roberts's vote ===
Immediately after the decision, there was speculation that the joint dissent was the original internal majority opinion, and that Roberts's vote changed sometime between March and the public issuance of the decision.

On July 1, 2012, CBS News, citing unnamed sources within the Court, said that over the course of internal deliberations Roberts changed his position from striking down the mandate to upholding it. The article, by journalist Jan Crawford, reported that during the Court's private conference immediately after the oral arguments, Roberts was inclined to strike down the mandate but, in disagreement with the other four conservative justices, was not certain this required striking down the law in its entirety. News articles in May 2012 that warned of potential "damage to the court—and to Roberts' reputation—if the court were to strike down the mandate" reportedly increased the external pressure on Roberts, who "is keenly aware of his leadership role on the court [and] is sensitive to how the court is perceived by the public", and pays more attention to media coverage of the Court than some of his colleagues. It was around this time that Roberts decided to uphold the law. One of the conservative justices reportedly pressed Roberts to explain why he had changed his view on the mandate, but was "unsatisfied with the response".

On July 2, Adam Liptak of The New York Times insinuated that the leak could have come from Justice Thomas, as Liptak pointed out that Crawford has long had a relationship with Thomas, who had granted her rare interviews and singled her out as his favorite reporter, saying, "There are wonderful people out here who do a good job—do a fantastic job—like Jan [Crawford]."

Some observers have suggested Roberts's philosophy of judicial restraint or the lack of Supreme Court precedents available "to say the individual mandate crossed a constitutional line" played a part in his decision. The article reported that after Roberts "withstood a month-long, desperate campaign to bring him back to his original position", with Kennedy, who was typically the swing vote in 5–4 decisions, leading the effort, the conservatives essentially told him, "You're on your own." The conservative dissent was unsigned and did not, despite efforts by Roberts to convince them to do so, make any attempt to join the Court's opinion, an unusual situation in which the four justices "deliberately ignored Roberts' decision, the sources said, as if they were no longer even willing to engage with him in debate".

In 2019 it was reported that Roberts had originally voted to invalidate the individual mandate and uphold the Medicaid expansion requirement. He believed that the Constitution's commerce clause never was intended to cover inactivity, such as the refusal to buy insurance. But he was uneasy with the political division in the vote tally and also did not want to invalidate the entire law because he thought the individual mandate was only inseverable from "community rating" and "guarantee issue" provisions of the law. Due to this impasse he explored the argument that the individual mandate could be upheld as a tax and invalidating the Medicaid expansion. Breyer and Kagan had previously voted to uphold the Medicaid expansion, but decided to switch and join Roberts's opinion on that section.

=== Political reactions ===
President Obama's comments on the Supreme Court's ruling

President Obama praised the decision in a series of remarks, while discussing the benefits of the legislation in a statement shortly after the decision. House Minority Leader Nancy Pelosi, who as Speaker of the House had been instrumental in the passage of the ACA, said that Senator Edward Kennedy of Massachusetts, a longtime proponent of health care reform who died before the bill became law, could now "rest."

The ruling quickly became a rallying cry for Republicans, who criticized the Court's reasoning and vowed to repeal the ACA. Though they had already repeatedly attempted to do so starting in January 2011, they were unsuccessful in enacting a repeal. Conservatives quickly seized on the fact that Obama and the bill's proponents insisted repeatedly throughout the protracted political debate 2009 and 2010 that the mandate was not a tax, but the Court upheld it on the grounds that it was. Republican presidential candidate Mitt Romney said he would repeal the law, as did Speaker of the House John Boehner and Senate Minority Leader Mitch McConnell. Several state attorneys general who challenged the law said they were disappointed with the Court's decision but happy that in doing so, the Court limited Congress's powers under the commerce clause. Several state Republican officials indicated their desire to take the option the Court granted them to not further expand Medicaid.

The American Medical Association, the National Physicians Alliance, the American Academy of Pediatrics, and the Association of American Medical Colleges said that the ruling was a victory.

The New York Times reported the ruling "may secure Obama's place in history".

=== Academic commentary ===
The New York Times reported that the Court's ruling was the most significant federalism decision since the New Deal. It reported it in this respect about the new limits the ruling placed on federal regulation of commerce and about the conditions the federal government may impose on money it gives the states. With respect to the Commerce Clause, the Court ruled that the federal government had no permission to force individuals not engaged in commercial activities to buy services they did not want. With respect to the Medicaid expansion under the Affordable Care Act, the Supreme Court held that the ACA's requirement that states rapidly extend coverage to new beneficiaries or lose existing federal payments was unduly coercive. The health-care law had to allow states to choose between participating in the expansion while receiving additional payments, or forgoing the expansion and retaining existing payments. Virginia Attorney General Ken Cuccinelli, the first to challenge the ACA in federal court, praised the limits the Court placed on federal regulation of commerce and on the conditions the federal government could impose on money it gives the states.

Georgetown Law professor Randy Barnett said that by invalidating the withholding of existing Medicaid funding as unconstitutionally coercive, the Court found an enforceable limit on the spending power of the federal government.

This limit on the spending power is part of Georgetown University law professor Neal Katyal's ruling analysis. Katyal, who served as acting solicitor general of the United States and argued the health care cases at the appellate level, argued that the ruling could change the relationship between the federal government and the states because of "the existence of an extraconstitutional limit" on the federal government's power under the Spending Clause. He said that until now it had been understood that when the federal government gave money to a state in exchange for the state's doing something, the federal government was free to do so as long as a reasonable relationship existed between the federal funds and the act the federal government wanted the state to perform.

He then referred to the Court holding that the ACA's requirement that states rapidly extend Medicaid coverage to new beneficiaries or lose existing federal payments was unduly coercive by noting that the court found that "such a threat is coercive and that the states cannot be penalized for not expanding their Medicaid coverage after receiving funds. And it does so in the context of Medicaid, which Congress created and can alter, amend or abolish at any time. ... This was the first significant loss for the federal government's spending power in decades. The fancy footwork that the court employed to view the act as coercive could come back in later cases to haunt the federal government. Many programs are built on the government's spending power, and the existence of an extraconstitutional limit on that power is a worrisome development."

Katyal also mentioned that the federal government told the court that long-standing laws contain clauses that condition money on state performance of certain activities. "The decision leaves open the question of whether those acts, and many others (like the Clean Air Act), are now unconstitutional as well." Reuters later reported that Katyal had reversed his opinion and stated that he didn't see any litigation coming out of the Supreme Court holding in the near term.

Kevin Russell, who teaches Supreme Court litigation at Harvard and Stanford Law Schools and clerked for Judge William Norris of the Ninth Circuit and Justice Breyer, agreed with Katyal. According to him, several significant civil rights statutes, enacted under Congress's Spending Power, are at risk to be unconstitutional, because the Court held that Congress exceeded its Spending Clause authority by forcing states into an all-or-nothing choice by threatening to revoke all of their Medicaid funding if they did not participate in the Medicaid expansion. Russell remembers that a decade ago several states made challenges to a number of important civil rights statutes that condition receipt of federal funds on the state's agreement to abide by non-discrimination principles in the federally funded programs. "These statutes include Title IX (sex discrimination in federally funded education programs), Title IV (race discrimination in any federally funded program), and the Rehabilitation Act (disability discrimination in federally funded programs). States argued that by threatening to take away all of a program's funds if the States didn't agree to abide by these statutes, Congress was engaging in unconstitutional coercion."

David B. Kopel, an adjunct professor of constitutional law at University of Denver, said that the ruling was the Court's most important ruling in defining the limits of Congress's power under the Spending Clause, because this clause must, like Congress's other powers, conform to the principles of state sovereignty embodied in Constitution, the Tenth and Eleventh Amendments. According to him, this has a tremendous impact on state budgets: "Today (and from now on!), states do not need to provide Medicaid to able-bodied childless adults. Likewise, states today have discretion about whether to provide Medicaid to middle-class parents. Undoubtedly, some states will choose to participate in the ACA's massive expansion of medical welfare, but fiscally responsible states now have the choice not to."

University of Michigan law professor Samuel Bagenstos told The Atlantic that the Court's holding on the Medicaid expansion could be a landmark decision in federalism jurisprudence, if the Medicaid issue were not in the same case as the individual mandate. He deemed it "a big deal" that the Court had for the first time struck down a condition on federal spending on the grounds that it coerced the states. In his opinion, this means that a number of federal statutes that had not really been subject to effective legal challenge before could now be challenged by the states.

=== Public opinion ===
Fairleigh Dickinson University's PublicMind conducted research on the public's constitutional perspective by asking registered voters about key legal issues brought up by ACA litigation through two surveys based upon a random sampling of the population. The authors, Bruce G. Peabody and Peter J. Woolley contend that, through public response on this case, despite claims of an ignorant and uninformed public, the masses can be confident, properly conflicted, and principled when considering major controversies and dilemmas. Rather than polling the public on raw personal opinion, the study inquired into random voters' legal judgment of the ACA's constitutionality. For example, 56% of Americans (as of February 2012) deemed that Congress does not have the legal right to require everyone to have health insurance, while 34% believed that such a mandate was legally permissible.

== Subsequent cases ==
Sebelius was the centerpoint of the third legal challenge to the ACA to reach the Supreme Court in California v. Texas, heard in the 2020–21 term. In 2017, Congress passed the Tax Cuts and Jobs Act that reduced the health insurance requirement of the ACA to $0 from 2019 onward, effectively eliminating the individual mandate. Texas and several states sued the federal government, arguing on the basis of Sebelius that with mandate eliminated, the entire ACA was unconstitutional. A district court agreed with this, which was upheld on a challenge by California and other states to the Fifth Circuit, stepping in when the government declined to challenge the ruling. The Supreme Court agreed to hear the case to consider not only if the elimination of the individual mandate makes the ACA unconstitutional, but factors related to the severability of the individual mandate from other provisions in the ACA, as well as whether California has standing.

== See also ==
- 2011 term opinions of the Supreme Court of the United States
- Aggregate effects doctrine
- Burwell v. Hobby Lobby Stores, Inc. (2014)
- King v. Burwell (2015)
