= Intergovernmental immunity (United States) =

US legal doctrine

Intergovernmental immunity is a legal doctrine in United States constitutional law that US states cannot interfere the United States government carrying out and exercising its constitutional duties and powers, respectively. It is sometimes referred to as the Supremacy Clause Immunity due to its source of legal authority and justification.

The doctrine was established by the United States Supreme Court in McCulloch v. Maryland (1819), which ruled unanimously that states cannot regulate property or operations of the federal government. In McCulloch's case, the state of Maryland had attempted to impose taxes and restrictions on the Second Bank of the United States. The Supreme Court found that if a state had the power to tax or regulate a federal institution, then the state effectively had the power to control or destroy the federal institution, thereby usurping constitutional powers from the United States Congress and federal officers. Thus, impeding the enforcement of federal law which would be in defiance and violation of the Supremacy Clause of the US constitution which sets the federal law to be superior over state laws and the Necessary and Proper Clause which gives the federal government sweeping implied powers to make and enforce federal laws.

The intergovernmental immunity doctrine was later broadened to include those that federal government contracts and deals with in the supreme court case North Dakota v. United States (1990). The Supreme Court subsequently unanimously reaffirmed the intergovernmental doctrine to include federal contractors in United States v. Washington (2022) when the State of Washington attempted to create a process for federal contractors to seek workers' compensation.

== Federal pension exemption from state tax ==
In Davis v. Michigan, 489 U.S. 803 (1989), the U.S. Supreme Court ruled that state governments may not tax federal pensions if they exempt their own state pensions from taxation. However, they may choose to subject both federal and state pensions to taxation, as the federal government waived its immunity in the Public Salary Tax Act (1939), 4 U.S.C. § 111. They may also tax pensions of other states. For example, Michigan exempts federal, Michigan state, and Michigan municipal pensions from taxation.

== Traffic and parking violations ==
In some cases, the federal government may voluntarily subject itself to local regulations. For example, the policy of the General Services Administration is that federal employees must obey state and local laws "except when the duties of your position require otherwise", and are personally responsible for paying parking fines and moving violation fines not required for official purposes. A 2008 Congressional report found the federal government's lack of effective enforcement of this policy was creating traffic hazards in Washington, D.C., and New York City.

== See also ==
- States' rights
- Supremacy Clause
