= Exclusive federal powers =

Aspect of a federal system of government

Exclusive federal powers are powers within a federal system of government that each constituent political unit (such as a state or province) is absolutely or conditionally prohibited from exercising. That is, either a constituent political unit may never exercise these powers, or may only do so with the consent of the federal government.

These powers are contrasted with concurrent powers, which are shared by both the federal government and each constituent political unit.

== Types of exclusive powers ==
All federations include an economic and monetary union. This gives the federal government exclusive authority to impose border controls, regulate certain categories of interstate trade (particularly natural monopolies and common carriers), and to establish a unified currency and monetary policy.

Federal constitutions also typically grant the federal government suzerainty over the states in matters of defense, diplomacy, and treaty-making. Additionally, since federations are grounded in the principle of mutual non-aggression and collective security, states may not use force or other sanctions against each other when engaged in disputes. However, the federal government can exercise these rights against individual member states through constitutional mechanisms such as direct rule or federal executions.

States are also usually prohibited from making unilateral territorial changes that would affect the rest of the federation. Thus, only the federal government has the authority to partition member states and annex or admit new states or territories. Some territories and districts (especially capitals, indigenous lands, and frontier or border regions) might be placed under direct federal administration.

== United States ==
According to U.S. law, reserved powers (i.e. states' rights) belong exclusively to each state. They are distinct from the enumerated powers that are listed in the Constitution of the United States, which include both concurrent powers and exclusive federal powers.

In Federalist No. 32, Alexander Hamilton described three distinct types of exclusive federal powers:

This exclusive delegation, or rather this alienation, of State sovereignty, would only exist in three cases: [i] where the Constitution in express terms granted an exclusive authority to the Union; [ii] where it granted in one instance an authority to the Union, and in another prohibited the States from exercising the like authority; and [iii] where it granted an authority to the Union, to which a similar authority in the States would be absolutely and totally contradictory and repugnant.

=== Examples ===
- The Constitution grants Congress power of "exclusive legislation" over the area now known as the District of Columbia.
- The Constitution says: "no state shall, without the consent of Congress, lay any imposts or duties on imports or exports, except for the purpose of executing its inspection laws."
- The Constitution gives Congress power to establish a "uniform rule" of naturalization throughout the country, and Hamilton says that there could be no uniform rule if each state has a distinct rule.

== See also ==
- Federal jurisdiction
