= Davis v. Michigan Department of Treasury =

Davis v. Michigan
- Supreme Court of the United States

Argued January 9, 1989 Decided March 28, 1989
- Full case name: Paul S. Davis v. Michigan Department of the Treasury
- Citations: 489 U.S. 803 (more) 109 S. Ct. 1500; 103 L. Ed. 2d 891
- Argument: Oral argument

Case history
- Prior: Judgment for Michigan, Michigan Court of Claims; affirmed, Davis v. Department of Treasury, 160 Mich. App. 98, 408 N.W.2d 433 (Mich. App. 1987); leave to appeal denied by Michigan Supreme Court.

Holding
- 4 U.S.C. § 111 applies to federal retirement benefits. Michigan violated intergovernmental tax immunity by taxing federal pensions while exempting its own state pensions from taxation.

Court membership
- Chief Justice William Rehnquist Associate Justices William J. Brennan Jr. · Byron White; Thurgood Marshall · Harry Blackmun; John P. Stevens · Sandra Day O'Connor; Antonin Scalia · Anthony Kennedy

Case opinions
- Majority: Kennedy, joined by Rehnquist, Brennan, White, Marshall, Blackmun, O'Connor, Scalia
- Dissent: Stevens

Laws applied
- Supremacy Clause; 4 U.S.C. § 111

Davis v. Michigan Department of Treasury, 489 U.S. 803 (1989), is a case in the Supreme Court of the United States holding that states may not tax federal pensions if they exempt their own state pensions from taxation. In the 1930s, the federal and state governments began to charge income tax on salaries paid to each other's employees. However, reciprocal treatment was required under the doctrine of intergovernmental immunity. The Court's ruling extended the reciprocity to pensions, since they are a form of deferred compensation for services previously rendered by an employee.

== Background ==
=== Intergovernmental immunity ===
In McCulloch v. Maryland (1819), the Supreme Court held that Maryland could not tax the Second Bank of the United States, as it would interfere with the bank's right to exist under federal law. The decision gave rise to the principle of intergovernmental immunity, which was gradually extended from government agencies to their employees. In Dobbins v. Commissioners of Erie (1842), the Court held that states could not tax the salaries of federal officials. In Collector v. Day (1870), the Court also held that the federal government could not tax the salaries of state officials.

In 1938, President Franklin Delano Roosevelt asked Congress to remove the reciprocal tax exemption for federal and state employees. The Supreme Court subsequently overturned its precedents from the 19th century. In Helvering v. Gerhardt (1938), the Court ruled that state salaries would not be exempt from federal income tax unless it caused an "actual and substantial" burden on the governmental functions of the state. Exempting state employees from federal taxation would intrude on the "national sovereign power to tax" and create "a privileged class of taxpayers." In Graves v. New York (1939), the Court held that federal salaries were also subject to "nondiscriminatory" taxation by the states.

In the Public Salary Tax Act (1939), which was codified as 4 U.S.C. § 111, Congress clarified the circumstances in which governmental salaries could be taxed. The Act stated that federal salaries could only be taxed if the state tax "does not discriminate against such officer or employee because of the source of such compensation." If the state exempted its own employees from taxation, then it cannot tax discriminate against federal employees by subjecting federal salaries to taxation.

=== Case background ===
Paul S. Davis served the federal government as a lawyer for the Securities and Exchange Commission and an administrative law judge. He retired from the federal government in 1980. From 1979 to 1984, he paid $4,299 in Michigan income taxes on his federal retirement benefits. At the time, Michigan exempted its own retirement benefits from taxation. However, pensions paid by the federal government, other states, and private industry were only entitled to a $7,500 deduction.

In Memphis Bank & Trust Co. v. Garner (1983), the Supreme Court held that states could not levy franchise taxes on federal bond interest if they exempted their own state bonds from taxation. Upon learning of the decision, Davis filed amended Michigan tax returns to 1979, claiming tax refunds on his federal retirement benefits. The Michigan Commissioner of Revenue, the Michigan Court of Claims, and the Michigan Court of Appeals ruled that Davis was not entitled to a refund. The Michigan courts ruled that he was not covered by the nondiscrimination provisions of 4 U.S.C. § 111, as he was retired and therefore no longer a federal employee. Davis appealed to the U.S. Supreme Court.

In a rare occurrence, Davis argued his own case pro se before the Supreme Court. Although state attorneys general often argue their own cases when they are sued in an official capacity, it is unusual for private parties to appear pro se at oral arguments. Davis divided his time with Michael K. Kellogg from the Solicitor General's office, who appeared for the United States as amicus curiae.

== Opinion of the Court ==
The Supreme Court ruled 8-1 in favor of Davis. The majority opinion, written by Justice Anthony Kennedy, held that states could not tax federal retirement benefits if they exempted their own state retirement benefits from taxation. Since retirement benefits were earned by employees as deferred compensation, federal pensions are entitled to the nondiscrimination provisions of 4 U.S.C. § 111, which covered "pay or compensation." The state of Michigan could remedy its discriminatory taxation by either removing the tax on federal pensions or levying a tax on its own pensions.

In a lone dissenting opinion, Justice John Paul Stevens argued that the tax was not discriminatory because it treated federal employees the same as other Michigan taxpayers. Since most Michigan taxpayers did not receive retirement benefits from the state, they were also subject to the Michigan income tax.

== Aftermath ==
Michigan chose to extend the income tax exemption to federal retirement benefits. Davis received $4,299 of tax refunds. Fourteen states that exempted their own state pensions from taxation had to refund billions of dollars to federal retirees.

The National Association of Retired Federal Employees, which filed an amicus brief in the case, established the Paul S. Davis scholarship in honor of the plaintiff in the case.
