= Powers of the United States Congress =

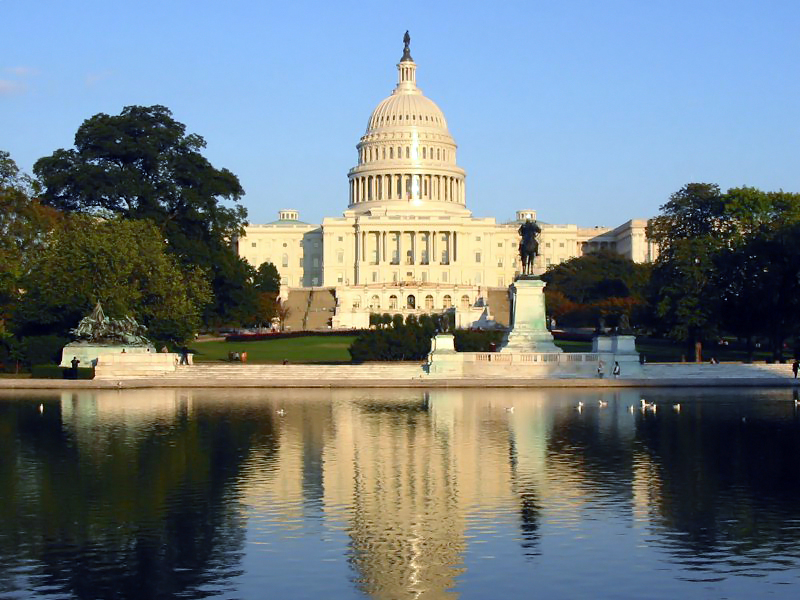
Congress meets in the United States Capitol.

Powers of the United States Congress are powers and duties given and assigned to the United States Congress; including ones enumerated by the Constitution, defined by rulings of the Supreme Court, and by its own efforts and by other factors such as history and custom. The United States Congress is the national legislature of the United States and the federal legislature of the United States government. Some powers are explicitly defined by the Constitution and are called enumerated powers; others have been assumed to exist and are called implied powers.

== Enumerated powers ==
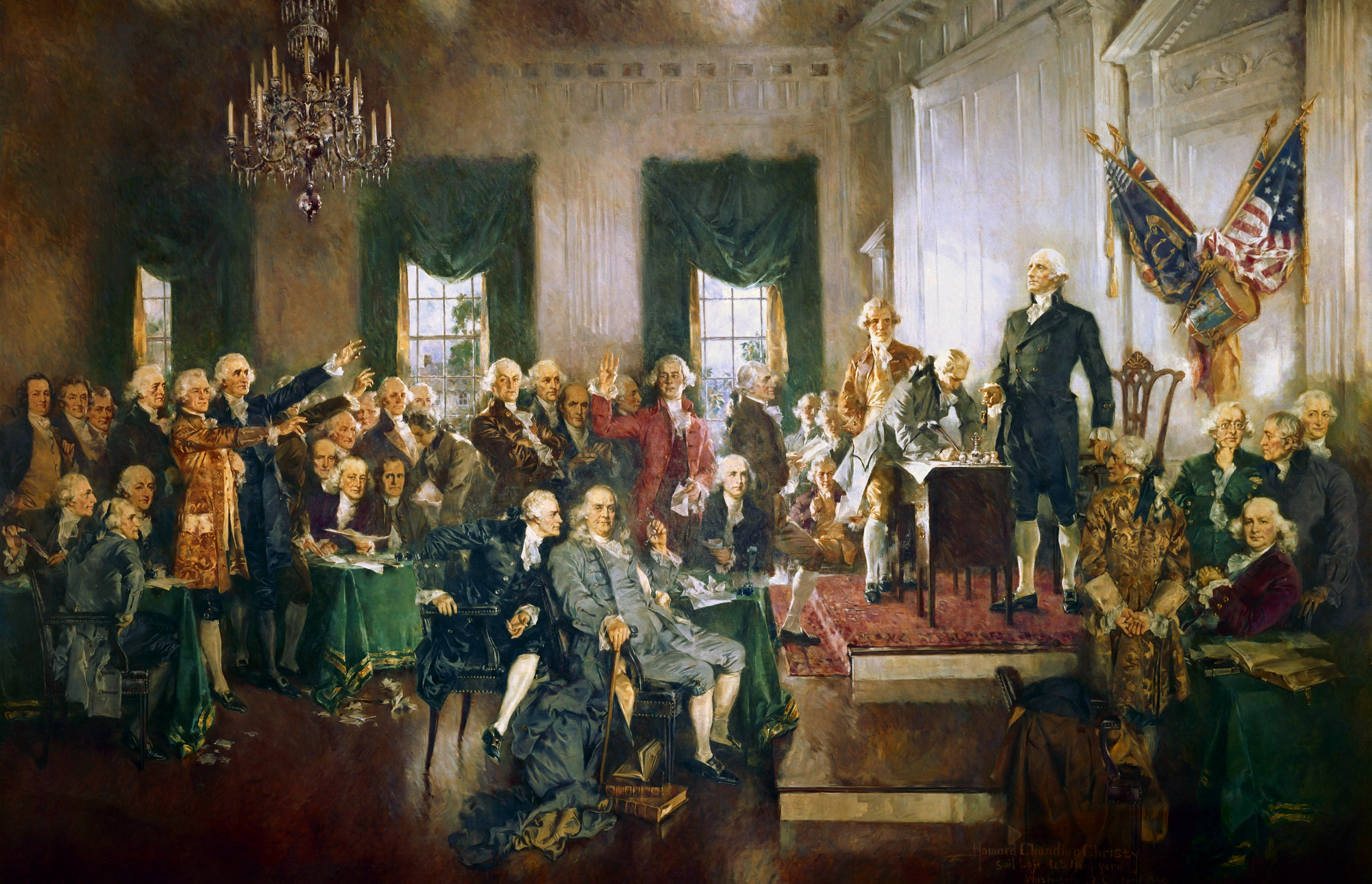
Former US general George Washington presided over the signing of the United States Constitution which included Alexander Hamilton, Benjamin Franklin, and James Madison.

Article I of the Constitution sets forth most of the powers of Congress, which include numerous explicit powers enumerated in Section 8. Additional powers are granted by other articles and by Constitutional amendments.

=== Article I ===
Among the powers specifically given to Congress in Article I Section 8, are the following:

1. To lay and collect taxes, duties, imposts and excises, to pay the debts and provide for the common defense and general welfare of the United States; but all duties, imposts and excises shall be uniform throughout the United States;

2. To borrow money on the credit of the United States;

3. To regulate commerce with foreign nations, and among the several states, and with the Native American tribes;

4. To establish a uniform rule of naturalization, and uniform laws on the subject of bankruptcies throughout the United States;

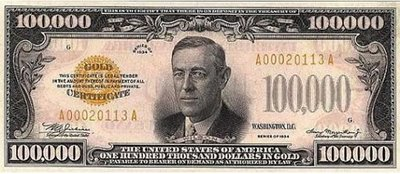
Congress has the power of the purse and it can tax citizens, spend money, and authorize the printing of currency such as this bill for $100,000.

5. To coin money, regulate the value thereof, and of foreign coin, and fix the standard of weights and measures;

6. To provide for the punishment of counterfeiting the securities and current coin of the United States;

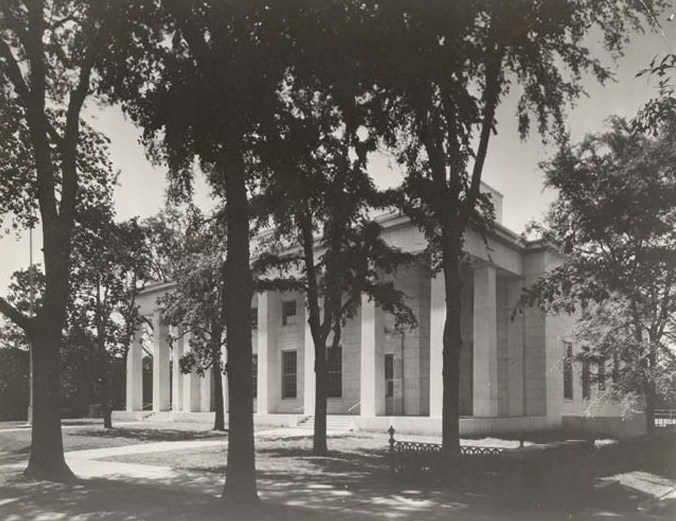
An enumerated congressional power is to establish post offices including this one in Athens, Georgia, pictured in 1942.

7. To establish post offices and post roads;

8. To promote the progress of science and useful arts, by securing for limited times to authors and inventors the exclusive right to their respective writings and discoveries;

9. To constitute tribunals inferior to the Supreme Court;

10. To define and punish piracies and felonies committed on the high seas, and offenses against the law of nations;

11. To declare war, grant letters of marque and reprisal, and make rules concerning captures on land and water;

12. To raise and support armies, but no appropriation of money to that use shall be for a longer term than two years;

13. To provide and maintain a navy;

14. To make rules for the government and regulation of the land and naval forces;

15. To provide for calling forth the militia to execute the laws of the union, suppress insurrections and repel invasions;

16. To provide for organizing, arming, and disciplining, the militia, and for governing such part of them as may be employed in the service of the United States, reserving to the states respectively, the appointment of the officers, and the authority of training the militia according to the discipline prescribed by Congress;

17. To exercise exclusive legislation in all cases whatsoever, over such District (not exceeding ten miles (16 km) square) as may, by cession of particular states, and the acceptance of Congress, become the seat of the government of the United States, and to exercise like authority over all places purchased by the consent of the legislature of the state in which the same shall be, for the erection of forts, magazines, arsenals, dockyards, and other needful buildings.

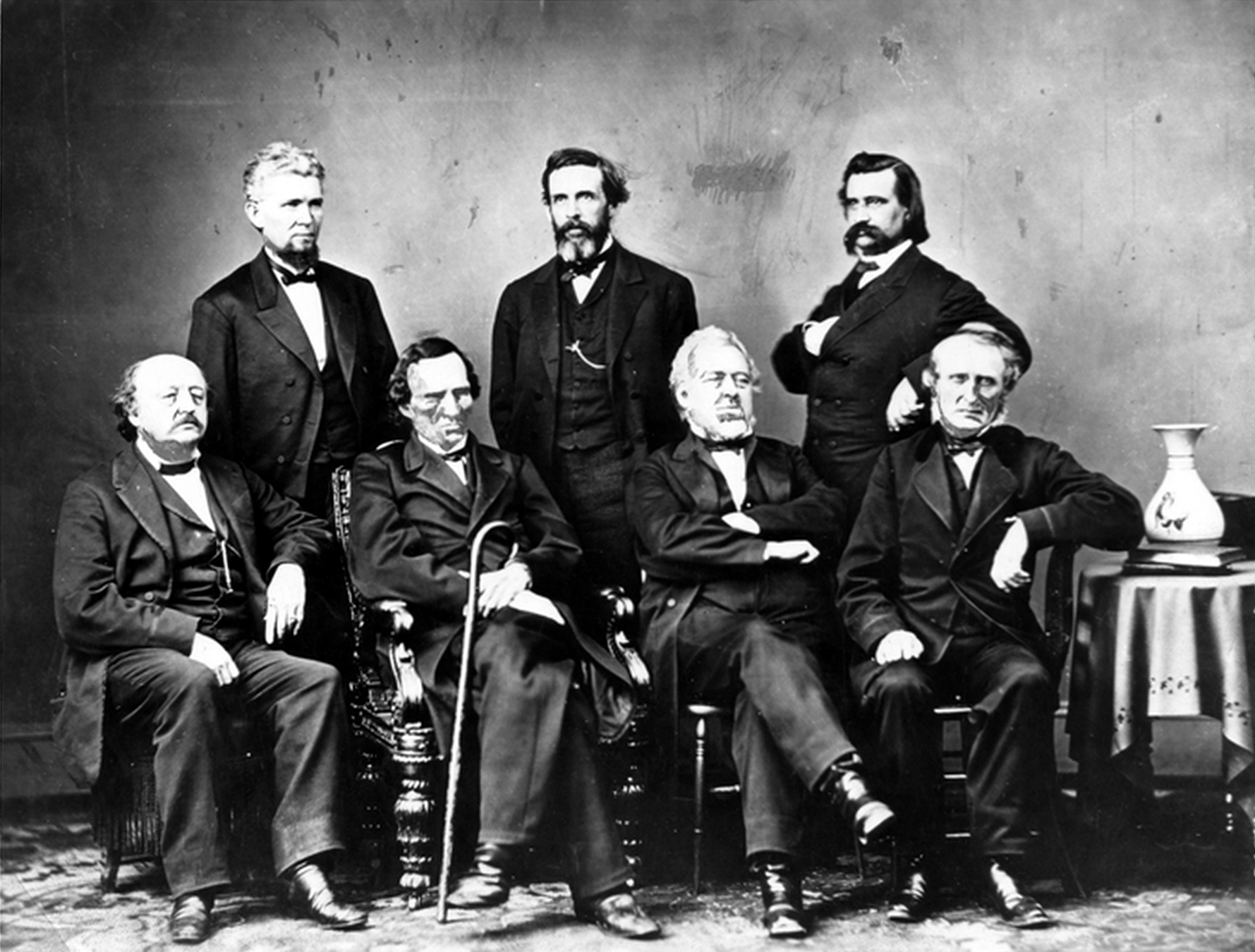
Congress has the power to impeach officials including the president. In 1868, this committee were the House managers in the impeachment trial of president Andrew Johnson who was almost convicted; Johnson stayed in office.

Article I grants several other powers outside of Section 8. Sections 2 and 3 give Congress the exclusive impeachment power, allowing impeachment, trial, and removal of the President, federal judges and other federal officers. Section 4 allows Congress to "at any time by Law make or alter such Regulations [on the times, places, and manner of holding elections to Congress], except as to the Places of chusing Senators" and to appoint by law their own day to assemble. Section 9 allows Congress to withhold consent to any officer of the United States accepting any foreign present, emolument, office, or title. Section 10 allows Congress to control all state laws that lay duties on imports or exports and to withhold consent to any state keeping troops or ships of war in time of peace, engaging in war, or entering into any agreement with another state or foreign power.

=== Other articles ===
Additional powers are granted to Congress by the other articles. Article II Section 1 allows Congress to "determine the Time of choosing the Electors [of the Electoral College], and the Day on which they shall give their Votes; which Day shall be the same throughout the United States". It also says, "the Congress may by Law provide for the Case of Removal, Death, Resignation or Inability, both of the President and Vice President, declaring what Officer shall then act as President, and such Officer shall act accordingly, until the Disability be removed, or a President shall be elected." Section 2 gives the Senate the power of advice and consent to federal appointments made by the president and allows Congress to "vest the Appointment of such inferior Officers, as they think proper, in the President alone, in the Courts of Law, or in the Heads of Departments". Section 3 gives Congress the right to receive information on the state of the union from the president.

Article III Section 2 allows Congress to create exceptions and regulations to the appellate jurisdiction of the Supreme Court and to make laws directing the place of trials of crimes committed outside of a state. Section 3 grants Congress the power "to declare the Punishment of Treason, but no Attainder of Treason shall work Corruption of Blood, or Forfeiture except during the Life of the Person at-tainted."

Article Four Section 3 gives Congress the power to admit new states into the Union. It also grants Congress the power "to dispose of and make all needful Rules and Regulations respecting the Territory or other Property belonging to the United States; and nothing in this Constitution shall be so construed as to Prejudice any Claims of the United States, or of any particular State."

Article V allows Congress to propose amendments to the Constitution and to specify ratification by state legislature or by conventions.It also states that if the amendments are proposed, they would then be sent to the states for ratification.

=== Amendments ===
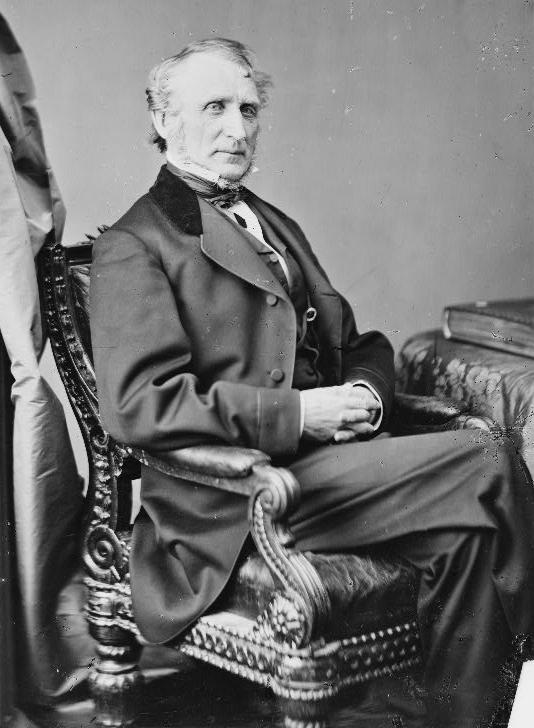
Representative John A. Bingham of Ohio was a principal framer of the Fourteenth Amendment.

Constitutional amendments have also granted, or confirmed, other congressional powers. The Twelfth Amendment gives Congress the power to choose the president or the vice president if no one receives a majority of Electoral College votes. The Thirteenth (1865), Fourteenth (1868), and Fifteenth Amendments (1870) gave Congress authority to enact legislation to enforce rights of all citizens regardless of race, including voting rights, due process, and equal protection under the law. The Sixteenth Amendment, ratified in 1913, extended power of taxation to include income taxes. The Nineteenth, Twenty-fourth, and Twenty-sixth amendments gave Congress the power to enforce the right of citizens, who are eighteen years of age or older, to vote regardless of sex, age, and whether they have paid taxes. The Twenty-third Amendment gives Congress the power to direct the manner in which the District of Columbia appoints electors. The Twenty-fifth Amendment gave Congress the power to determine what body can declare the president unable to discharge the powers and duties of the office and the power to decide whether the president shall resume the powers and duties of the office whenever the president and the body are in conflict.

== Implied powers ==
Congress has implied powers derived from clauses such as the General Welfare Clause, the Necessary and Proper Clause, and the Commerce Clause and from its legislative powers.

Congress has exclusive authority over financial and budgetary matters, through the enumerated power to lay and collect taxes, duties, imposts and excises, to pay the debts and provide for the common defense and general welfare of the United States. This power of the purse is one of Congress's primary checks on the executive branch. In Helvering v. Davis, the Supreme Court affirmed Social Security as an exercise of the power of Congress to spend for the general welfare. Generally both Senate and House have equal legislative authority although only the House may originate revenue bills and, by tradition, appropriation bills.

The Necessary and Proper Clause of the Constitution permits Congress "To make all laws which shall be necessary and proper for carrying into execution the foregoing powers, and all other powers vested by this Constitution in the government of the United States, or in any department or officer thereof." Broad interpretations of this clause have effectively widened the scope of Congress's legislative authority, such as in McCulloch v Maryland, which recognized the federal governments authority to establish a national bank under the tax and spend clause, and that states had no authority to interfere with it.

The Supreme Court has held that Congress has implied powers through the Commerce Clause. For example, in Standard Oil Co. of New Jersey v. United States and United States v. Darby Lumber Co., it was held that Congress could divide monopolies, prohibit child labor, and establish a minimum wage under the Commerce Clause. Also, in Wickard v Filburn it was held that the Section 8 power "To regulate commerce…among the several states" gave Congress the authority to limit the amount of wheat that a farmer could grow in order to feed animals on his own farm, even though this activity was not commerce and was not interstate, because such activities by private individuals had a substantial economic effect on interstate commerce in wheat, even though only indirectly.

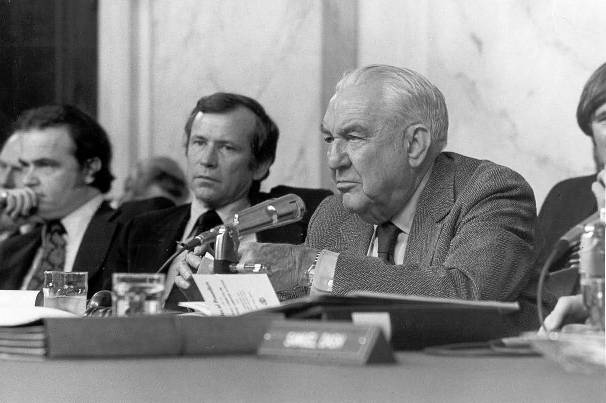
One congressional power is oversight of other branches of the government. In the early 1970s, the Senate investigated the activities of President Richard Nixon regarding Watergate which led to the president's resignation.

One of the foremost legislative functions of the Congress is the power to investigate and to oversee the executive branch. Congressional oversight is usually delegated to committees and is facilitated by Congress's subpoena power. The Supreme Court affirmed in Watkins v. United States that "[the] power of the Congress to conduct investigations is inherent in the legislative process" and that "[it] is unquestionably the duty of all citizens to cooperate with the Congress in its efforts to obtain the facts needed for intelligent legislative action. It is their unremitting obligation to respond to subpoenas, to respect the dignity of the Congress and its committees and to testify fully with respect to matters within the province of proper investigation." Some critics have charged that Congress has in some instances failed to do an adequate job of overseeing the other branches of government. In the Valerie Plame Wilson episode sometimes known as the Plame affair, some critics, including Representative Henry A. Waxman, charged that Congress was not doing an adequate job of oversight in this case. Other critics charge Congress was lax in its oversight duties regarding presidential actions such as warrantless wiretapping, although others respond that Congress did investigate the legality of decisions by President George W. Bush involving such matters.

== Erosion of congressional authority ==
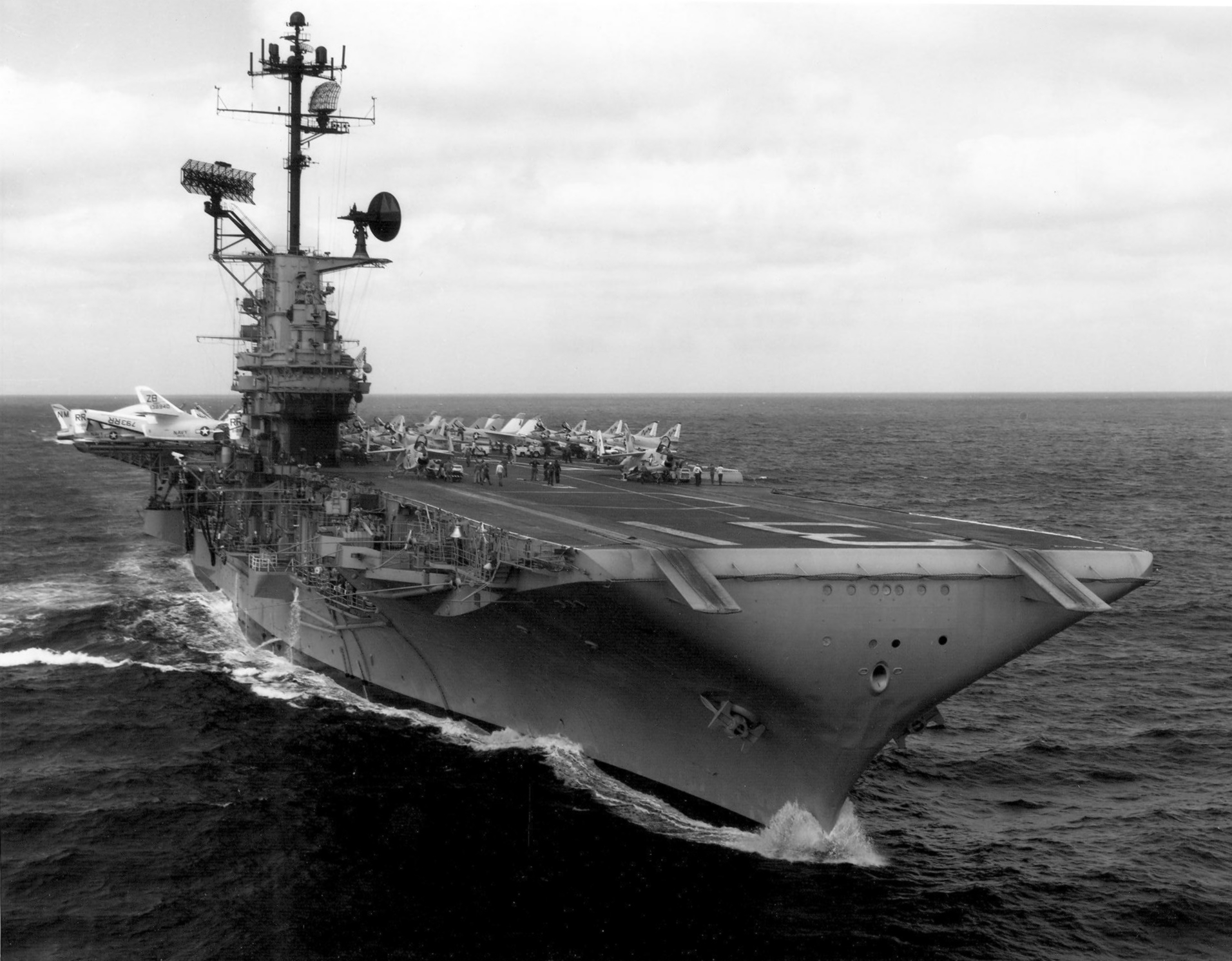
Congress authorizes defense spending.

Although the Constitution gives Congress an important role in national defense, including the exclusive power to declare war, to raise and maintain the armed forces, and to make rules for the military, some critics charge that the executive branch has usurped Congress's Constitutionally-defined task of declaring war. While historically presidents initiated the process for going to war, they asked for and received formal war declarations from Congress for the War of 1812, the Mexican–American War, the Spanish–American War, World War I, and World War II, although President Theodore Roosevelt's military move into Panama in 1903 did not get congressional assent. Presidents have initiated war without congressional war declarations; Truman called the Korean War a "police action" and the Vietnam War lasted over a decade without a declaration of war. In 1970, Time magazine noted: "All told, it has been calculated, U.S. presidents have ordered troops into position or action without a formal congressional declaration a total of 149 times" before 1970. In 1993, one writer noted "Congress's war power has become the most flagrantly disregarded provision in the Constitution," and that the "real erosion (of congressional authority to declare war) began after World War II." President George H. W. Bush claimed he could begin Operation Desert Storm and launch a "deliberate, unhurried, post–Cold War decision to start a war" without congressional approval. Critics charge that President George W. Bush largely initiated the Iraq War with little debate in Congress or consultation with Congress, despite a congressional vote on military force authorization. Disagreement about the extent of congressional versus presidential power regarding war has been present periodically throughout the nation's history.

Congress has also delegated powers to lay duties and regulate commerce onto the president. It passed the Trading with the Enemy Act of 1917, which allowed the president to oversee and restrict commerce and impose tariffs or sanctions whenever there is an ongoing war. In 1962, it passed the Trade Expansion Act allowing the president to impose and adjust tariffs on articles that threaten national security. In 1977, it passed the International Emergency Economic Powers Act, allowing the president to declare national emergencies that would authorize him with the power to regulate commerce.

Congress has given over a hundred emergency powers, such as the power to divert money that was appropriated for the military, to the president through various laws and has authorized the president with the power to declare national emergencies through the National Emergencies Act. It has become common for presidents to declare emergencies, with over 30 different states of emergency being in simultaneous effect in 2019. Although the law requires Congress to consider a vote on each state of emergency every six months, Congress has never done so as of 2019.

Congress has delegated immigration powers to the president in the Immigration and Nationality Act of 1952, authorizing the president to create restrictions on or suspend the entry of some or all aliens into the United States and to set the period for such restrictions or suspension.

Congress delegated department regulation powers to the Department of Justice when it allowed the special prosecutor provisions of the Ethics in Government Act to expire in 1999. Since then, the Justice Department creates its own regulations on special counsels.

Congress has in recent times allowed its power to consent to foreign emoluments fall into disuse. In the past, Congress explicitly gave or withheld consent, such as when it refused to allow Andrew Jackson to receive a gold medal from Venezuela or when it allowed Abraham Lincoln to receive elephant tusks and a sword from Siam and place them with the Interior Department.
