= Plenipotentiary =

Diplomat with full powers

A plenipotentiary (from the Latin plenus "full" and potens "powerful") is a diplomat who has full powers—authorization to sign a treaty or convention on behalf of a sovereign. When used as a noun more generally, the word can also refer to any person who has full powers. As an adjective, it describes something which confers full powers, such as an edict or an assignment.

== Diplomats ==
Before the era of rapid international transport or essentially instantaneous communication (such as telegraphy in the mid-19th century and then radio), diplomatic mission chiefs were granted full (plenipotentiary) powers to represent their government in negotiations with their host nation. Conventionally, any representations made or agreements reached with a plenipotentiary would be recognized and complied with by their government.

Historically, the common generic term for high diplomats of the crown or state was minister. It therefore became customary to style the chiefs of full ranking missions as minister plenipotentiary. This position was roughly equivalent to the modern ambassador, a term that historically was reserved mainly for missions between the great powers and also relating to the city-state of Venice.

Permanent missions at a bilateral level were chiefly limited to relations between large, neighboring or closely allied powers, rarely to the very numerous small principalities, hardly worth the expense. Diplomatic missions were dispatched for specific tasks, such as negotiating a treaty bilaterally, or via a conference of plenipotentiaries, such as the Imperial Diet of the Holy Roman Empire. In such cases, it was normal to send a representative minister empowered to cast votes. For example, in the Treaty of Paris, ending the American Revolution, John Adams, Benjamin Franklin and John Jay were named "minister plenipotentiary of the United States" to the Netherlands, France and Spain, respectively.

By the time of the Congress of Vienna (1814–15), which codified diplomatic relations, ambassador had become a common title, and was established as the only class above minister plenipotentiary. It gradually became the standard title for bilateral mission chiefs, as their ranks no longer tended to reflect the importance of the states, which came to be treated as formally equal.

In modern times, heads of state and of government, and more junior ministers and officials, can easily meet or speak with each other personally. Therefore, ambassadors do not require plenipotentiary powers, even though they are designated and accredited as "extraordinary and plenipotentiary".

== Administration ==
Besides diplomatic plenipotentiaries, some permanent administrators are also given plenipotentiary powers. Central governments have sometimes conferred plenipotentiary status (either formally or de facto) on territorial governors. This has been most likely to occur when the remoteness of the administered territory made it impracticable for the central government to maintain and exercise its policies, laws and initiatives directly. In modern times, the plenipotentiary title has sometimes been revived; for example, for the administrators of protectorates, or in other cases of indirect rule.

Examples of plenipotentiary administration are given below.

=== Colonial era ===
- From 1879 to 1884, the explorer Henry Morton Stanley (1841–1904) was styled "Plenipotentiary of the Committee for the Studies of Upper Congo" (CEHC) (from 1882, renamed International Association of the Congo (AIC), a front for the ambitions of Belgian King Leopold II, not supported by the Belgian government. In Equatorial Africa, while military command lay with four consecutive commandants of the (leading) station at Karema, on 22 April 1884 the International Association of the Congo became the independent Congo Free State (headed, on a personal basis and not connected to the Belgian state, by Leopold II), with plenipotentiaries styled "administrator-general" at first.

=== Pre–World War II Europe ===
- After successfully suppressing the Hungarian Revolution of 1848, the leader of the Austrian army Julius Jacob von Haynau was appointed plenipotentiary in order to enforce martial law in Hungary.
- On the Greek island of Crete, after the President of the Executive Commission of the Cretan Assembly, Ioannis Sfakianakis (1848–1924), had exercised executive power between 20 March and 21 December 1898, having evicting the last Ottoman Wāli (Ottoman governor), a Supreme Plenipotentiary Commissioner of the (Christian protecting) Powers headed the official administration of the Cretan State instituted on 20 March 1898 (formally under Ottoman suzerainty until union with Greece was unilaterally declared on 6 October 1908):
  - 21 December 1898–30 September 1906: Prince George of Greece (1869–1959)
  - 1 October 1906–30 September 1911: Alexandros Zaimis (1855–1936)
  - 30 September 1911–30 May 1913: the post remained vacant but was not abolished until the island was officially incorporated into the Greece in December 1913.
- During the Russian Civil War, Karl Lander was named Plenipotentiary of the Northern Caucasus and the Don by the Soviet government to exercise this power for prosecution of rebellious Cossacks.
- In Slovakia, between 15 January 1927 and 28 June 1928 Jozef Kállay (1881–1939) was Minister Plenipotentiary and Administrator of the Czechoslovak government.
- In Ireland, in October 1921, the revolutionary parliament of Ireland gave Michael Collins, Arthur Griffith, George Gavan Duffy, Eamonn Duggan and Robert Barton positions of plenipotentiary to negotiate the Anglo-Irish Treaty with Britain.

=== Nazi Germany ===
- Granting absolute power over a particular or general governmental matter to a single individual was a pervasive practice in the Nazi regime. Among the most prominent holders of this title in Nazi Germany were:
  - Hjalmar Schacht, Generalbevollmächtigter der Kriegswirtschaft (General Plenipotentiary for War Economy) from 21 May 1935 until his resignation on 26 November 1937;
  - Walther Funk, Generalbevollmächtigter für die Wirtschaft (General Plenipotentiary for the Economy) from 5 February 1938 until the end of the regime in 1945;
  - Fritz Sauckel, Generalbevollmächtigter für den Arbeitseinsatz (General Plenipotentiary for Labor Allocation) from 21 March 1942 until the end of the regime;
  - Albert Speer, Generalbevollmächtigter für Rüstungsaufgaben im Vierjahresplan (General Plenipotentiary for Armament Tasks in the Four Year Plan) from 1 March 1942 until the end of the regime;
  - Joseph Goebbels, Reichsbevollmächtigter für den totalen Kriegseinsatz (Reich Plenipotentiary for the Total War Effort) from 25 July 1944 until his suicide on 1 May 1945;
  - Wilhelm Frick, Generalbevollmächtigter für die Reichsverwaltung (General Plenipotentiary for the Reich Administration) from 21 May 1935 to his dismissal on 20 August 1943;
  - Heinrich Himmler, who succeeded Frick in this position on 24 August 1943 until dismissed from all his offices on 29 April 1945. His aide, Walter Schellenberg, held the title of Sonderbevollmächtigter (Special Plenipotentiary) to Himmler.
- In the Slovak Republic (14 March 1939–4 April 1945) three consecutive German Envoys and Ministers Plenipotentiary (the old diplomatic style) formally represented the Reich in the fascist puppet state of Jozef Tiso. These were Hans Bernard from 30 June 1939 to 29 July 1940; Manfred Freiherr von Killinger from 29 July 1940 to 19 January 1941; and Hanns Ludin from 19 January 1941 to 4 April 1945.
- In the occupied Netherlands, under Reichskommissar (Reich Commissioner) Arthur Seyss-Inquart, German Plenipotentiaries were appointed from 1940-45 at the provincial level by the side of the regular Dutch Provincial Commissioners in Drenthe, Friesland, Gelderland, Groningen, Limburg, North Holland, Overijssel, Utrecht and South Holland, and in 1940–1944 in North Brabant and Zeeland.
- In Denmark, another country under Nazi-German occupation (9 April 1940–5 May 1945), a German protectorate was established, led by a Reichsbevollmächtigter (Reich Plenipotentiary). This was Cecil von Renthe-Fink from 9 April 1940 until he was replaced on 5 November 1942 by SS-Obergruppenführer Werner Best. Best remained in this post until the German surrender in Denmark on 5 May 1945, even though on 29 August 1943 the German military commander, Hermann von Hanneken, took over more direct administration of affairs after declaring a state of military emergency.
- In Italy, Nazi Germany's major European Axis ally, the government of Benito Mussolini was overthrown on 25 July 1943. Following occupation by German forces in a de facto military takeover of Italy, Mussolini was installed on 23 September 1943 as Provisional Head of State and Prime Minister of the "Italian Social Republic", a fascist puppet state headquartered at Salò. The German administration was headed by Generalbevollmächtigter (General Plenipotentiary) Rudolf Rahn from 23 September 1943 to 28 April 1945. There were separate military commanders in charge of the occupation forces.
- In Hungary, after the regime of Miklós Horthy began to explore contacts with the Allies in hopes of negotiating a surrender, German forces occupied the country on 19 March 1944 and Edmund Veesenmayer was named Reichsbevollmächtigter (Reich Plenipotentiary). On 15 October 1944, when Horthy tried to sign an armistice with the Soviet Union, Veesenmayer instead forced him to abdicate as regent and name Ferenc Szálasi, leader of the Arrow Cross Party, as prime minister of a puppet regime. Veesenmeyer continued as the real power in Hungary through 4 April 1945, when the German forces were finally expelled by the Red Army.

=== In Africa ===
- When the empress of Ethiopia, Zauditu, succeeded to her throne, her relative Ras Tafari Makonnen was installed as her crown prince. As he subsequently became the effective ruler of the country, his title was seen as being insufficient. As a result, Zauditu then gave him the further position of regent plenipotentiary. By virtue of it, he continued to serve as the most powerful man in Ethiopia until he was given another title, that of king-under-the-empress. He held this new title until Zauditu died and he was proclaimed emperor in his own right with the regnal name of Haile Selassie.

=== Since 1945 ===
==== South Africa ====
It may be impractical to hold a new referendum for each step of a series of negotiated changes, and thus ministers might ask an electorate for plenipotentiary powers in advance, as occurred in the South African apartheid referendum, 1992. Prior to the referendum, the state president F. W. de Klerk had already implemented extensive reforms (e.g., removing the Group Areas Act). His right to negotiate these reforms was questioned by other parties (e.g., Andries Treurnicht's Conservative Party), particularly in response to the National Party's Potchefstroom by-election defeat in February 1992. Given how heavily entrenched apartheid was in the South African legal system at the time, de Klerk needed to nullify many previous bills and pass many new ones, making a series of individual referendums impractical. Consequently, as a practical solution to the political deadlock, de Klerk held a referendum on 17 March 1992 to ask the white South African electorate to give him plenipotentiary powers.

==== Russia ====
On 18 May 2000, in the post-Soviet Russian Federation the title Plenipotentiary of the President was established for the appointees of the President of Russia, Vladimir Putin, in each of the seven federal districts created on 13 May: Dalnevostochny (Far Eastern), Privolzhsky (Volga Region), Severo-Zapadny (North Western), Sibirsky (Siberian), Tsentralny (Central), Uralsky (Ural), and Yuzhny (Southern).

== See also ==
- Envoy (title)
- Jus legationis
- Jus tractatuum
- Managerial prerogative
- Plenary power
- Plenipotentiary Conference
