= Intergovernmental =

Intergovernmental can refer to:

- Intergovernmentalism, in international relations
- Intergovernmental immunity (disambiguation)
- Intergovernmental risk pool, a form of risk management
- Intergovernmental organization or international organization
