= Federalism =

Political concept

Federal states: regional separation of powers Unitary states: regional integration of powers

Federalism is a mode of government that combines a general level of government (a central or federal government) with a regional level of sub-unit governments (e.g., counties, provinces, states, cantons, territories, etc.), while dividing the powers of governing between the two levels of governments.

Johannes Althusius (1563–1638) is considered the father of modern federalism, along with Montesquieu. By 1748, in his treatise The Spirit of Law, Montesquieu (1689–1755) observed various examples of federalist governments: in corporate societies, in the polis bringing villages together, and in cities themselves forming confederations. In the modern era, federalism was first adopted by a union of the states of the Old Swiss Confederacy as of the mid-14th century.

Federalism differs from confederalism, where the central government is created subordinate to the regional states—and is notable for its regional separation of governing powers (e.g., in the United States, the Articles of Confederation as the general level of government of the original Thirteen Colonies). Federalism also differs from the unitary state, where the regional level is subordinate to the central government, even after a devolution of powers (e.g., the United Kingdom).

Examples of federalisms today include: Argentina, Australia, Brazil, Canada, Ethiopia, Germany, India, Iraq, Malaysia, Mexico, Nigeria, Russia, Switzerland, the United Arab Emirates, and the United States. At a multi-state level, the European Union has been characterized by some as a federation.

== Overview ==
=== Etymology ===
The pathway of regional integration or regional separation

The terms "federalism" and "confederalism" share a root in the Latin word foedus, meaning "treaty, pact or covenant". Until the late eighteenth century their two early meanings were essentially the same: a simple league among sovereign states, based on a treaty; (thus, initially the two were synonyms). It was in this sense that James Madison referred to the new US Constitution as "neither a national nor a federal Constitution, but a composition of both"—i.e., constituting neither a single large unitary state nor a league/confederation among several small states, but a hybrid of the two forms—according to Madison; "The Federalist No. 39".

Notably, in the course of the nineteenth century in the United States, the meaning of federalism shifted, now referring uniquely to the novel compound-political form established at the Philadelphia Constitution Convention—while the meaning of confederalism remained as a league of states.

=== History ===
In a narrow sense, federalism refers to the mode in which the body politic of a state is organized internally—and this is the meaning most often used in modern times. Political scientists, however, use the term federalism in a much broader sense, referring instead to a "multi-layer or pluralistic concept of social and political life".

The first forms of federalism took place in ancient times, in the form of alliances between tribes or city states. According to historian Joseph Baratta, his colleagues generally begin the history of federalism with the Israelite tribal confederacy led by a military leader called a Judge between c.1200 – c.1000 BCE. Examples from the Hellenic world between the seventh to second century BCE were the Archaic League, the Aetolic League, the Peloponnesian League, and the Delian League. An early ancestor of federalism was the Achaean League in Hellenistic Greece. Unlike the Greek city states of Classical Greece, each of which insisted on keeping its complete independence, changing conditions in the Hellenistic period drove city states to band together even at the cost of surrendering part of their sovereignty. Several leagues of states existed in the contemporary China. Subsequent unions of states included the first and second Swiss Confederations (1291–1798 and 1815–48); the United Provinces of the Netherlands (1579–1795); the German Confederation (1815–66); the first American union, known as the Confederation of the United States of America (1781–89); and the second American union, formed as the United States of America (1789-present).

=== Political theory ===
Modern federalism is a political system that (nominally) is based upon operating under democratic rules and institutions; and where governing powers are shared between a country's national and provincial/state governments. However, the term federalist comprises various political practices that differ in important details among the (so-called) federalist nations—some of which are democratic in name only (e.g., modern Russia)—leaving the terms "federalist", "federalism", "federation", etc., dependent on context. And, because the term federalization also proclaims distinctive political processes, its use also depends on context.

Typically, political theory today discusses two main types of the federalization process:

- integrative, (or aggregative) federalization, which encompasses several political processes, including: 1) transforming a confederation into a federation; 2) incorporating non-federated population(s) into an existing federation; or 3) integrating a non-federated population by creating a new or revised federation.
- devolutive, (or dis-aggregative) federalization: 1) transforming a unitary state into a federation.

=== Reasons for adoption ===
According to Daniel Ziblatt, there are four competing theoretical explanations for adopting a federal system:

1. Ideational theories, which hold: that among subunit population(s), a greater ideological commitment to decentralist ideas makes federalism more likely to be sought and adopted.
2. Cultural-historical theories: that in societies with culturally or ethnically fragmented populations, federalized subunits are more likely to be favored and adopted.
3. "Social contract" theories: that federalism emerges via a bargaining process between the center and a periphery (subunit)—where the center is not powerful enough to dominate the periphery, but the periphery is not powerful enough to secede from the center, (e.g., modern Iraq re Kurdistan).
4. "Infrastructural power" theories: that federalism is likely to emerge for the subunit population that already has highly developed infrastructures, (e.g., they already are a constitutional, parliamentary, and administratively modernized state).

Immanuel Kant noted that "the problem of setting up a state can be solved even by a nation of devils"—if they possess a constitution that pits opposing factions against each other with a durable system of binding checks and balances. Essentially, particular states may use federation as a mechanism (a safeguard) against the possibilities of rebellion or war—or the rise of repressive government via a would-be dictator or a centralized oligarchy.

Proponents of federal systems have historically argued that the structures of checks-and-balances and power-sharing that are inherent in a federal system reduces threats—both foreign and domestic. And federalism enables a state to be both large and diverse, by mitigating the risk of a central government turning tyrannical.

== Examples ==
Countries around the world have implemented federal systems using variations of central and regional sovereignty for their governments. For convenience of studying these governments, they may be divided according to several categories, such as: minimalistic federations, which consist of only two sub-federal units (subunits); as compared to multi-regional federations, consisting of three or more regional governments (subunits). Or, based on their body polity type: emirate, provincial, state, republicanism or constitutional monarchy, democratic—or democratic in-name-only. And, federal systems may be differentiated between those whose entire territory is federated, vs. only part of their territory is federated. Some systems are national while others, like the European Union, are supra-national.

Two extremes of federalism are notable: 1) at one extreme, the strong federal state is almost completely unitary, with few powers reserved to local governments; 2) at the opposite extreme, the national government may be a federation in name-only, while actually operating as a confederation, (see "pathway" graphic re regional integration or regional separation). Federalism may encompass as few as two or three internal divisions, as is the case in Belgium or Bosnia and Herzegovina.

In Canada, federalism typically implies opposition to sovereignty movements—most commonly the question of Quebec separatism. In 1999, the Government of Canada established the Forum of Federations as an international network for exchange of best practices among federal and federalizing countries. Headquartered in Ottawa, the Forum of Federations partner governments include Australia, Brazil, Ethiopia, Germany, India, Mexico, Nigeria, Pakistan and Switzerland.

The governments of Argentina, Australia, Brazil, India, and Mexico, among others, are organized along federalist principles.

== Europe vs. the United States ==
In Europe, "federalist" is sometimes used to describe those who favor a common federal government, with distributed power at regional, national and supranational levels. The Union of European Federalists advocates for this development within the European Union, ultimately leading to the United States of Europe. Although there are medieval and early modern examples of European states which used confederal and federal systems, contemporary European federalism originated in post-war Europe; one of the more important initiatives was Winston Churchill's speech in Zürich in 1946.

In the United States, federalism originally referred to belief in a stronger central government. When the U.S. Constitution was being drafted, the Federalist Party supported a stronger central government, while "Anti-Federalists" wanted a weaker central government. This is very different from the modern usage of "federalism" in Europe and the United States. The distinction stems from the fact that "federalism" is situated in the middle of the political spectrum between a confederacy and a unitary state. The U.S. Constitution was written as a replacement for the Articles of Confederation, under which the United States was a loose confederation with a weak central government.

In contrast, Europe has a greater history of unitary states than North America, thus European "federalism" argues for a weaker central government, relative to a unitary state. The modern American usage of the word is much closer to the European sense. As the power of the U.S. federal government has increased, some people have perceived a much more unitary state than they believe the Founding Fathers intended. Most people politically advocating "federalism" in the United States argue in favor of limiting the powers of the federal government, especially the judiciary (see Federalist Society, New Federalism).

The contemporary concept of federalism came about with the creation of an entirely new system of government that provided for democratic representation at two governing levels simultaneously, which was implemented in the US Constitution. In the United States implementation of federalism, a bicameral general government, consisting of a chamber of popular representation proportional to population (the House of Representatives), and a chamber of equal State-based representation consisting of two delegates per State (the Senate), was overlaid upon the pre-existing regional governments of the thirteen independent States. With each level of government allocated a defined sphere of powers, under a written constitution and the rule of law (that is, subject to the independent third-party arbitration of a supreme court in competence disputes), the two levels were thus brought into a coordinate relationship for the first time.

In 1946, Kenneth Wheare observed that the two levels of government in the US were "co-equally supreme". In this, he echoed the perspective of American founding father James Madison who saw the several States as forming "distinct and independent portions of the supremacy" in relation to the general government.

== In anarchism ==
In anarchism, federalism, also referred to as council system, is a horizontalist and decentralized organizational doctrine which holds that society should be built from the bottom-up, from the periphery to the centre. Higher-order units are merely the direct expression of lower-order units delegating, combining and coordinating. Though there is no central government or administration, higher-order committees and councils, composed of delegates from federal constituencies, may convene under a popular, revocable mandate.

Embracing the principle of free and voluntary association as the basis of a federal society, constituent entities of an anarchist federation are ideally autonomous and self-determining, collaborating equally, freely and mutually within the federation through the values of solidarity and autonomy.

Unlike a republican federation, federalism, in anarchy, is not simply a form of political division or devolution, but rather, federative principles apply to all aspects of society, including social relations and the economy. Consequently, anarchist federalism, promoting widespread, common ownership over the means of production, detests the centralized and unequal nature of capitalism, and the hierarchy of its companies and corporations: an anarchist federalist society would envisage widespread, federalized wealth distribution.

Comparing republican and anarchist federalism, James Guillaume states that Switzerland's federative cantonal system, despite its direct democracy, differs significantly from anarchist federalism: while Swiss federalism retains a state and provides only limited regional sovereignty, anarchist federalism as envisioned by Pierre-Joseph Proudhon is stateless, providing every autonomy with absolute sovereignty and distinct individuality. The Swiss constitution, in its support of indivisibility and nationhood and its view that its cantons are mere territorial divisions rather than sovereign constituencies, is incompatible with anarchist federalism and its principles of free association, decentralization and autonomy.

Anarchist federalism is a rejection of the statism and nationalism present in modern federations, and instead provides an alternative system of federative organization founded on stateless individuality and autonomy. For anarchists, republican federalism is as oppressive as a centralized, unitary state, for all it is perceived to accomplish is delegate and transfer the perceived oppression of a state to local levels and jurisdictions.

== Constitutional structure ==
=== Division of powers ===
In a federation, the division of power between federal and regional governments is usually outlined in the constitution. Almost every country allows some degree of regional self-government, but in federations the right to self-government of the component states is constitutionally entrenched. Component states often also possess their own constitutions which they may amend as they see fit, although in the event of conflict the federal constitution usually takes precedence.

In almost all federations the central government enjoys the powers of foreign policy and national defense as exclusive federal powers. Were this not the case a federation would not be a single sovereign state, per the UN definition. Notably, the states of Germany retain the right to act on their own behalf at an international level, a condition originally granted in exchange for the Kingdom of Bavaria's agreement to join the German Empire in 1871. The constitutions of Germany and the United States provide that all powers not specifically granted to the federal government are retained by the states. The Constitution of some countries, like Canada and India, state that powers not explicitly granted to the provincial/state governments are retained by the federal government. Much like the US system, the Australian Constitution allocates to the Federal government (the Commonwealth of Australia) the power to make laws about certain specified matters which were considered too difficult for the States to manage, so that the States retain all other areas of responsibility. Under the division of powers of the European Union in the Lisbon Treaty, powers which are not either exclusively of Union competence or shared between the Union and the Member States as concurrent powers are retained by the constituent States.

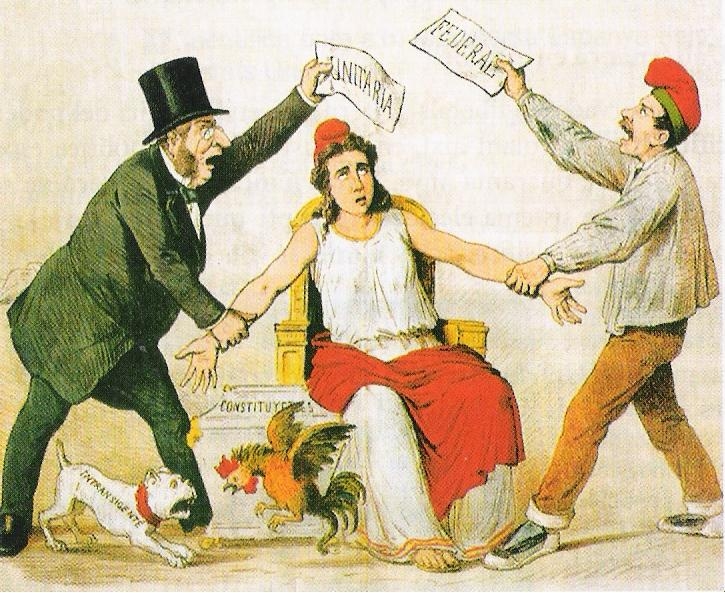
Satiric depiction of late 19th-century political tensions in Spain

Where every component state of a federation possesses the same powers, we are said to find 'symmetric federalism'. Asymmetric federalism exists where states are granted different powers, or some possess greater autonomy than others do. This is often done in recognition of the existence of a distinct culture in a particular region or regions. In Spain, the Basques and Catalans, as well as the Galicians, spearheaded a historic movement to have their national specificity recognized, crystallizing in the "historical communities" such as Navarre, Galicia, Catalonia, and the Basque Country. They have more powers than the later expanded arrangement for other Spanish regions, or the Spain of the autonomous communities (called also the "coffee for everyone" arrangement), partly to deal with their separate identity and to appease peripheral nationalist leanings, partly out of respect to specific rights they had held earlier in history. However, strictly speaking Spain is not a federation, but a system of asymmetric devolved government within a unitary state.

It is common that during the historical evolution of a federation there is a gradual movement of power from the component states to the centre, as the federal government acquires additional powers, sometimes to deal with unforeseen circumstances. The acquisition of new powers by a federal government may occur through formal constitutional amendment or simply through a broadening of the interpretation of a government's existing constitutional powers given by the courts.

Usually, a federation is formed at two levels: the central government and the regions (states, provinces, territories), and little to nothing is said about second or third level administrative political entities. Brazil is an exception, because the 1988 Constitution included the municipalities as autonomous political entities making the federation tripartite, encompassing the Union, the States, and the municipalities. Each state is divided into municipalities (municípios) with their own legislative council (câmara de vereadores) and a mayor (prefeito), which are partly autonomous from both Federal and State Government. Each municipality has a "little constitution", called "organic law" (lei orgânica). Mexico is an intermediate case, in that municipalities are granted full-autonomy by the federal constitution and their existence as autonomous entities (municipio libre, "free municipality") is established by the federal government and cannot be revoked by the states' constitutions. Moreover, the federal constitution determines which powers and competencies belong exclusively to the municipalities and not to the constituent states. However, municipalities do not have an elected legislative assembly.

Federations often employ the paradox of being a union of states, while still being states (or having aspects of statehood) in themselves. For example, James Madison (author of the United States Constitution) wrote in Federalist Paper No. 39 that the US Constitution "is in strictness neither a national nor a federal constitution; but a composition of both. In its foundation, it is federal, not national; in the sources from which the ordinary powers of the Government are drawn, it is partly federal, and partly national..." This stems from the fact that states in the US maintain all sovereignty that they do not yield to the federation by their own consent. This was reaffirmed by the Tenth Amendment to the United States Constitution, which reserves all powers and rights that are not delegated to the Federal Government as left to the States and to the people.

=== Bicameralism ===
The structures of most federal governments incorporate mechanisms to protect the rights of component states. One method, known as 'intrastate federalism', is to directly represent the governments of component states in federal political institutions. Where a federation has a bicameral legislature the upper house is often used to represent the component states while the lower house represents the people of the nation as a whole. A federal upper house may be based on a special scheme of apportionment, as is the case in the senates of the United States and Australia, where each state is represented by an equal number of senators irrespective of the size of its population.

Alternatively, or in addition to this practice, the members of an upper house may be indirectly elected by the government or legislature of the component states, as occurred in the United States prior to 1913, or be actual members or delegates of the state governments, as, for example, is the case in the German Bundesrat and in the Council of the European Union. The lower house of a federal legislature is usually directly elected, with apportionment in proportion to population, although states may sometimes still be guaranteed a certain minimum number of seats.

=== Intergovernmental relations ===
In Canada, the provincial governments represent regional interests and negotiate directly with the central government. A First Ministers conference of the prime minister and the provincial premiers is the de facto highest political forum in the land, although it is not mentioned in the constitution.

=== Constitutional change ===
Federations often have special procedures for amendment of the federal constitution. As well as reflecting the federal structure of the state this may guarantee that the self-governing status of the component states cannot be abolished without their consent. An amendment to the constitution of the United States must be ratified by three-quarters of either the state legislatures, or of constitutional conventions specially elected in each of the states, before it can come into effect. In referendums to amend the constitutions of Australia and Switzerland it is required that a proposal be endorsed not just by an overall majority of the electorate in the nation as a whole, but also by separate majorities in each of a majority of the states or cantons. In Australia, this latter requirement is known as a double majority.

Some federal constitutions also provide that certain constitutional amendments cannot occur without the unanimous consent of all states or of a particular state. The US constitution provides that no state may be deprived of equal representation in the senate without its consent. In Australia, if a proposed amendment will specifically impact one or more states, then it must be endorsed in the referendum held in each of those states. Any amendment to the Canadian constitution that would modify the role of the monarchy would require unanimous consent of the provinces. The German Basic Law provides that no amendment is admissible at all that would abolish the federal system.

=== Other technical terms ===
- Fiscal federalism – the relative financial positions and the financial relations between the levels of government in a federal system.
- Formal federalism (or 'constitutional federalism') – the delineation of powers is specified in a written constitution, which may or may not correspond to the actual operation of the system in practice.
- Executive federalism refers in the English-speaking tradition to the intergovernmental relationships between the executive branches of the levels of government in a federal system and in the continental European tradition to the way constituent units 'execute' or administer laws made centrally.
- Gleichschaltung – the conversion from a federal governance to either a completely unitary or more unitary one, the term was borrowed from the German for conversion from alternating to direct current. During the Nazi era the traditional German states were mostly left intact in the formal sense, but their constitutional rights and sovereignty were eroded and ultimately ended and replaced with the Gau system. Gleichschaltung also has a broader sense referring to political consolidation in general.
- defederalize – to remove from federal government, such as taking a responsibility from a national level government and giving it to states or provinces.

== In relation to conflict ==
It has been argued that federalism and other forms of territorial autonomy are a useful way to structure political systems in order to prevent violence among different groups within countries because it allows certain groups to legislate at the subnational level. Some scholars have suggested, however, that federalism can divide countries and result in state collapse because it creates proto-states. Others still have shown that federalism is only divisive when it lacks mechanisms that encourage political parties to compete across regional boundaries.

Federalism is sometimes viewed in the context of international negotiation as "the best system for integrating diverse nations, ethnic groups, or combatant parties, all of whom may have cause to fear control by an overly powerful center". However, those skeptical of federal prescriptions sometimes believe that increased regional autonomy can lead to secession or dissolution of the nation. In Syria, for example, federalization proposals have failed in part because "Syrians fear that these borders could turn out to be the same as the ones that the fighting parties have currently carved out."

== See also ==
- Bibliography of the United States Constitution
- Commonwealth – Political community established for common good
- Consociationalism – Political power sharing among cultural groups
- Cooperative federalism – Flexible government where state and national level cooperate
- Feudalism – Legal and military structure in medieval Europe
- Neo-feudalism – Theoretical rebirth of antique governance
- Federal government – Political union of partially self-governing territories under a national government
- Federal republicanism – Ideology combining federal and republican forms of government
- Federal Union – Pro-European British political group
- Forum of Federations
- Layer cake federalism – Political arrangement
- Non-governmental federation – Federations which are not states or national governments
- Pillarisation – Division of civil society along religio-political lines
- States' rights – Political powers reserved for U.S. states
- Union of Utrecht – 1579 treaty unifying the northern Netherlands provinces
- World Federalist Movement – Political idea of a global federal government

== Sources ==
- Bednar, Jenna (2011). "The Political Science of Federalism". Annual Review of Law and Social Science. 7: 269–288. doi:10.1146/annurev-lawsocsci-102510-105522.
- Broschek, Jorg (2016). "Federalism in Europe, America and Africa: A Comparative Analysis". Federalism and Decentralization: Perceptions for Political and Institutional Reforms (PDF). Singapore: Konrad Adenauer Stiftung. pp. 23–50. Archived (PDF) from the original on 2020-10-20.
- Forsyth, Murray (1981). Unions of States: The Theory and Practice of Confederation. Leicester University Press. OCLC 1170233780.
- Gerven, Walter van (2005). The European Union: A Polity of States and Peoples. Stanford: Stanford University Press. ISBN 9780804750646. Archived from the original on 2023-07-31.
- Wheare, Kenneth (1946). Federal Government. London: Oxford University Press.
