= Latin American Free Trade Association =

1962–1980 intergovernmental organisation

The Latin American Free Trade Association (LAFTA, later transformed into the Latin American Integration Association, Spanish: Asociación Latinoamericana de Integración, Portuguese: Associação Latino-Americana de Integração) was created in the 1960 Treaty of Montevideo by Argentina, Brazil, Chile, Mexico, Paraguay, Peru, and Uruguay. The signatories hoped to create a common market in Latin America and offered tariff rebates among member nations. In 1980, LAFTA reorganized into the Latin American Integration Association (ALADI) which now has 13 members: Argentina, Bolivia, Brazil, Chile, Colombia, Cuba, Ecuador, Mexico, Panama, Paraguay, Peru, Uruguay, and Venezuela.

== History ==
The Latin American Free Trade Association came into effect on January 2, 1962. When the trade association commenced it had seven members and its main goal was to eliminate all duties and restrictions on the majority of their trade within a twelve-year period. By the late 1960s the area of LAFTA had a population of 220 million and produced about $90 billion of goods and services annually. By the same time it had an average per capita gross national product of $440.

By 1970, LAFTA expanded to include four more Latin American nations which were Bolivia, Colombia, Ecuador, and Venezuela. It now consisted of eleven nations. In 1980, LAFTA reorganized into the Latin American Integration Association (Asociación Latinoamericana de Integración, ALADI). The membership of ALADI had remained unchanged until Cuba joined in 1999.

== Structure ==
The goal of the LAFTA is the creation of a free trade zone in Latin America. It should foster mutual regional trade among the member states, as well as with the United States of America and the European Union. To achieve these goals, several institutions are foreseen:

- the council of foreign ministers
- a conference of all participating countries
- a permanent council

The LAFTA agreement has important limitations: it only refers to goods, not to services, and it does not include a coordination of policies. Compared e.g. to the European Union the political and economic integration is very limited.

== Effects ==
LAFTA brought many new positive changes to Latin America. With LAFTA in place existing productive capacity could be used more fully to supply regional needs, industries could reduce costs as a result of potential economies through expanded output and regional specialization, and attraction to new investment occurred as a result of the regional market area. Although LAFTA has brought many constructive results, it has also brought problems to individual nations as well as to Latin America as a whole.

Some of the problems which the individual countries face are the way they are grouped together by their economic strengths according to LAFTA. The grouping was originally Brazil and Argentina in one group, Colombia, Chile, Peru, Uruguay, and Venezuela in the second group, and the last group which included Bolivia, Ecuador, and Paraguay. There is a problem in these classifications because these countries are very different economically as well as in other aspects which the classification does not take into account.

Problems which Latin America faced as a whole had to deal with many of the nations in the continent being underdeveloped. The Free Trade Agreement was seen as a way of the countries having greater economic interactions amongst each other and thus improving the economic state of the poorer nations.

== Latin American Integration Association (ALADI) ==
The Latin American Integration Association (ALADI) is now the largest Latin American group of integration. It covers more than 20 million sq kilometres and more than 493 million people. It is responsible for regulations on foreign trade which includes regulations on technical measures, sanitary regulations, environment protection measures, quality control measures, automatic licensing measures, price control measures, monopolistic measures, as well as other measures. These regulations are put into place in order for trade to be even handed amongst members of ALADI.

== See also ==
- Andean Community
- Andean Group
- CARICOM Single Market and Economy
- Mercosur
