= List of United States Supreme Court cases, volume 17 =

Supreme Court of the United States
- Interactive map of Supreme Court of the United States
- 38°53′26″N 77°00′16″W
- Established: March 4, 1789; 237 years ago
- Location: Washington, D.C.
- Coordinates: 38°53′26″N 77°00′16″W
- Composition method: Presidential nomination with Senate confirmation
- Authorised by: Constitution of the United States, Art. III, § 1
- Judge term length: life tenure, subject to impeachment and removal
- Number of positions: 9 (by statute)
- Website: supremecourt.gov

This is a list of cases reported in volume 17 (4 Wheat.) of United States Reports, decided by the Supreme Court of the United States in 1819.

== Nominative reports ==
In 1874, the U.S. government created the United States Reports, and retroactively numbered older privately published case reports as part of the new series. As a result, cases appearing in volumes 1–90 of U.S. Reports have dual citation forms; one for the volume number of U.S. Reports, and one for the volume number of the reports named for the relevant reporter of decisions (these are called "nominative reports").

=== Henry Wheaton ===
Starting with the 14th volume of U.S. Reports, the Reporter of Decisions of the Supreme Court of the United States was Henry Wheaton. Wheaton was Reporter of Decisions from 1816 to 1827, covering volumes 14 through 25 of United States Reports which correspond to volumes 1 through 12 of his Wheaton's Reports. As such, the dual form of citation to, for example, McCulloch v. Maryland is 17 U.S. (4 Wheat.) 316 (1819).

== Justices of the Supreme Court at the time of 17 U.S. (4 Wheat.) ==
The Supreme Court is established by Article III, Section 1 of the Constitution of the United States, which says: "The judicial Power of the United States, shall be vested in one supreme Court . . .". The size of the Court is not specified; the Constitution leaves it to Congress to set the number of justices. Under the Judiciary Act of 1789 Congress originally fixed the number of justices at six (one chief justice and five associate justices). Since 1789 Congress has varied the size of the Court from six to seven, nine, ten, and back to nine justices (always including one chief justice).

When the cases in 17 U.S. (4 Wheat.) were decided, the Court comprised these seven justices:

Portrait	Justice	Office	Home State	Succeeded	Date confirmed by the Senate (Vote)	Tenure on Supreme Court
	John Marshall	Chief Justice	Virginia	Oliver Ellsworth	January 27, 1801 (Acclamation)	February 4, 1801 – July 6, 1835 (Died)
	Bushrod Washington	Associate Justice	Virginia	James Wilson	December 20, 1798 (Acclamation)	November 9, 1798 (Recess Appointment) – November 26, 1829 (Died)
	William Johnson	Associate Justice	South Carolina	Alfred Moore	March 24, 1804 (Acclamation)	May 7, 1804 – August 4, 1834 (Died)
	Henry Brockholst Livingston	Associate Justice	New York	William Paterson	December 17, 1806 (Acclamation)	January 20, 1807 – March 18, 1823 (Died)
	Thomas Todd	Associate Justice	Kentucky	new seat	March 2, 1807 (Acclamation)	March 3, 1807 – February 7, 1826 (Died)
	Gabriel Duvall	Associate Justice	Maryland	Samuel Chase	November 18, 1811 (Acclamation)	November 23, 1811 – January 12, 1835 (Resigned)
	Joseph Story	Associate Justice	Massachusetts	William Cushing	November 18, 1811 (Acclamation)	February 3, 1812 – September 10, 1845 (Died)

== Notable Cases in 17 U.S. (4 Wheat.) ==
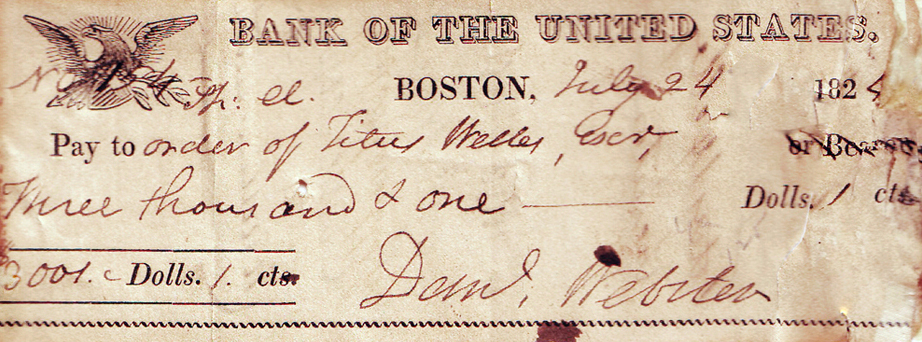
A bank draft from the Second Bank of the United States, by Daniel Webster, who represented McCulloch

=== McCulloch v. Maryland ===
McCulloch v. Maryland, 17 U.S. (4 Wheat.) 316 (1819), is a landmark U.S. Supreme Court decision that defined the scope of the U.S. Congress's legislative power and how it relates to the powers of American state legislatures. The dispute in McCulloch involved the legality of the national bank and a tax that the state of Maryland imposed on it. In its ruling, the Supreme Court established that the Necessary and Proper Clause of the U.S. Constitution gives the U.S. federal government certain implied powers that are not explicitly enumerated in the Constitution, and that the American federal government is supreme over the states, and so states' ability to interfere with the federal government is limited.

=== Sturges v. Crowninshield ===
Sturges v. Crowninshield, 17 U.S. (4 Wheat.) 122 (1819), dealt with the constitutionality of New York having passed bankruptcy laws and retroactively applying them.

=== Dartmouth College v. Woodward ===
Dartmouth College v. Woodward, 17 U.S. (4 Wheat.) 518 (1819), is a landmark decision in United States corporate law from the United States Supreme Court dealing with the application of the Contracts Clause of the United States Constitution to private corporations. The case arose when the president of Dartmouth College was deposed by its trustees, leading to the New Hampshire legislature attempting to force the college to become a public institution, and so place the ability to appoint trustees in the hands of the governor of New Hampshire. The Supreme Court upheld the durability of the original charter of the college, which pre-dated the creation of the State.

== Citation style ==
Under the Judiciary Act of 1789 the federal court structure at the time comprised District Courts, which had general trial jurisdiction; Circuit Courts, which had mixed trial and appellate (from the US District Courts) jurisdiction; and the United States Supreme Court, which had appellate jurisdiction over the federal District and Circuit courts—and for certain issues over state courts. The Supreme Court also had limited original jurisdiction (i.e., in which cases could be filed directly with the Supreme Court without first having been heard by a lower federal or state court). There were one or more federal District Courts and/or Circuit Courts in each state, territory, or other geographical region.

Bluebook citation style is used for case names, citations, and jurisdictions.

- "C.C.D." = United States Circuit Court for the District of . . .
  - e.g.,"C.C.D.N.J." = United States Circuit Court for the District of New Jersey
- "D." = United States District Court for the District of . . .
  - e.g.,"D. Mass." = United States District Court for the District of Massachusetts
- "E." = Eastern; "M." = Middle; "N." = Northern; "S." = Southern; "W." = Western
  - e.g.,"C.C.S.D.N.Y." = United States Circuit Court for the Southern District of New York
  - e.g.,"M.D. Ala." = United States District Court for the Middle District of Alabama
- "Ct. Cl." = United States Court of Claims
- The abbreviation of a state's name alone indicates the highest appellate court in that state's judiciary at the time.
  - e.g.,"Pa." = Supreme Court of Pennsylvania
  - e.g.,"Me." = Supreme Judicial Court of Maine

== List of cases in 17 U.S. (4 Wheat.) ==
NOTE: Some decisions have alternate pagination, indicated by "{ }."

Case Name	Page and year	Opinion of the Court	Concurring opinion(s)	Dissenting opinion(s)	Lower Court	Disposition
Philadelphia Baptist Association v. Hart's Executors	1 (1819)	Marshall	Story	none	C.C.D. Va.	certification
The Divina Pastora	52 {37} (1819)	Marshall	none	none	C.C.D. Mass.	reversed
Evans v. Phillips	73 {48} (1819)	per curiam	none	none	C.C.D. N.Y.	dismissed
Van Ness v. Buel	74 {48} (1819)	Story	none	none	C.C.D. Vt.	affirmed
Williams v. Peyton's Lessee	77 (1819)	Marshall	none	none	C.C.D. Ky.	affirmed
The Experiment	84 (1819)	Marshall	none	none	C.C.D. Mass.	evidentiary decision
Weightman v. Caldwell	85 {53} (1819)	Johnson	none	none	C.C.D.C.	affirmed
The Sybil	98 {59} (1819)	Marshall	none	none	C.C.D.S.C.	affirmed
The Caledonian	100 {60} (1819)	Story	none	none	C.C.D.R.I.	affirmed
The Langdon Cheves	103 (1819)	Story	none	none	C.C.D.R.I.	affirmed
The Friendschaft	105 (1819)	Story	none	none	C.C.D.N.C.	affirmed
United States v. Howland	108 {64} (1819)	Marshall	none	none	C.C.D. Mass.	reversed
Sturges v. Crowninshield	122 {70} (1819)	Marshall	none	none	C.C.D. Mass.	certification
M'Millan v. M'Neill	209 (1819)	Marshall	none	none	D. La.	affirmed
Barr v. Gratz's Heirs	213 (1819)	Story	none	none	C.C.D. Ky.	affirmed
Eliason v. Henshaw	225 {118} (1819)	Washington	none	none	C.C.D.C.	reversed
Somerville's Executors v. Hamilton	230 (1819)	Story	none	none	C.C.D.N.C.	certification
Bank of Columbia v. Okely	235 {122} (1819)	Johnson	none	none	C.C.D.C.	reversed
United States v. Rice	246 {128} (1819)	Story	none	none	C.C.D. Mass.	affirmed
Brown v. Gilman	255 {132} (1819)	Marshall	none	none	C.C.D. Mass.	affirmed
The Estrella	298 (1819)	Livingston	none	none	D. La.	affirmed
Miller ex rel. United States v. Nicholls	311 (1819)	Marshall	none	none	Pa.	dismissed
M'Culloch v. Maryland	316 (1819)	Marshall	none	none	Md.	reversed
The General Smith	438 {214} (1819)	Story	none	none	C.C.D. Md.	reversed
M'Iver's Lessee v. Walker	444 (1819)	Marshall	none	none	C.C.D.E. Tenn.	reversed
Orr v. Hodgson	453 {221} (1819)	Story	none	none	C.C.D.C.	affirmed
Astor v. Wells	466 (1819)	Johnson	none	none	C.C.D. Ohio	affirmed
McArthur v. Browder	488 {237} (1819)	Marshall	none	none	C.C.D. Ohio	reversed
The Neustra Senora	497 (1819)	Johnson	none	none	C.C.D.N.C.	affirmed
Wheaton v. Sexton's Lessee	503 {243} (1819)	Johnson	none	none	C.C.D.C.	reversed
Sergeant's Lessee v. Biddle	508 (1819)	Washington	none	none	C.C.D. Del.	certification
Boyd's Lessee v. Graves	513 (1819)	Duvall	none	none	C.C.D. Ky.	affirmed
Dartmouth College v. Woodward	518 {250} (1819)	Marshall	Washington	none	N.H.	reversed

== See also ==
- certificate of division
