= Concurrent powers =

Powers shared between a federal government and smaller administrative units

Concurrent powers are powers of a federal state that are shared by both the federal government and each constituent political unit, such as a state or province. These powers may be exercised simultaneously within the same territory, in relation to the same body of citizens, and regarding the same subject-matter. Concurrent powers are contrasted with reserved powers (not possessed by the federal government) and with exclusive federal powers (forbidden to be possessed by the states, or requiring federal permission).

In many federations, enumerated federal powers are supreme and so, they may pre-empt a state or provincial law in case of conflict. Concurrent powers can therefore be divided into two kinds: those not generally subject to federal pre-emption, such as the power to tax private citizens, and other concurrent powers.

In the United States, examples of the concurrent powers shared by both the federal and the state governments include the powers to tax, to spend, and to create lower courts.

== Types of concurrent powers ==
The number and types of concurrent powers depend on the level of integration established by the constitution and other laws. Federations that practice cooperative federalism will predominantly exercise concurrent powers, while those applying the doctrine of dual federalism will demarcate most powers as either exclusive to the federal government or reserved for the states. Asymmetric federalism offers a hybrid of these two models, in which the federal government may possess extensive exclusive and/or concurrent powers, but certain member states have negotiated opt-out rights over select policy areas.

Depending on the federation, any or all of the following powers may be shared between different levels of government:

- Power of the purse and eminent domain. These powers are provided to both levels of government in nearly every modern federal constitution
- Peace, order, and good government, typically focused on passing and enforcing laws regarding internal security, public order, and anti-corruption
- Martial law, which may be imposed directly by the federal government or requested by the states. Brazil, the United States, Iraq, and historically the German Empire and Yugoslavia are among a handful of federations that have placed certain categories of reservists or gendarmes under dual state-federal control.
- General welfare, which can encompass all lawmaking powers regardless of subject matter
- Diplomacy and treaty-making, in federations that allow paradiplomacy
- Border controls, usually limited to ethnic or asymmetric federations

== See also ==
- Concurrent jurisdiction
- Intergovernmental immunity
