= Sturges v. Crowninshield =

- Supreme Court of the United States

Argued February 8, 1819 Decided February 17, 1819
- Full case name: Sturges v. Crowninshield
- Citations: 17 U.S. 122 (more) 4 Wheat. 122; 4 L. Ed. 529; 1819 U.S. LEXIS 310

Court membership
- Chief Justice John Marshall Associate Justices Bushrod Washington · William Johnson; H. Brockholst Livingston · Thomas Todd; Gabriel Duvall · Joseph Story

Case opinion
- Majority: Marshall, joined by unanimous

Sturges v. Crowninshield, 17 U.S. (4 Wheat.) 122 (1819), dealt with the constitutionality of New York creating bankruptcy laws and retroactively applying those laws.

== First issue ==
This case decided whether state bankruptcy laws violated the provision in Article I, Section 8 of the Constitution giving Congress the power "to establish ... uniform laws on the subject of bankruptcies throughout the United states". This was a power which Congress exercised in the Bankruptcy Act of 1800, the first federal bankruptcy law in American history. Were the states restricted from passing bankruptcy laws of their own?

Chief Justice Marshall stated in the opinion:

The first [issue] is ... since the adoption of the constitution of the United States, any state has authority to pass a bankrupt law, or whether the power is exclusively vested in the congress of the United States?

Chief Justice Marshall's answer to this question was not very clear.

In Ogden v. Saunders, eight years later, Justice Johnson explained why the ruling was so vague:

The report of the case of Sturges v. Crowninshield needs also some explanation. The Court was, in that case, greatly divided in their views of the doctrine, and the judgment partakes as much of a compromise, as of a legal adjudication. The minority thought it better to yield something than risk the whole.

In other words, the Republican judges wanted to retain all state bankruptcy laws and the Federalists wanted to abolish them all. Minority Republicans agreed on the best bargain they could by agreeing to sacrifice the New York law if the rest were not deemed unconstitutional.

== Second issue ==
In addition, the Supreme Court addressed the issue of whether retroactive application of the particular New York bankruptcy law in question was a "law impairing the Obligation of Contracts", in violation of Article I, Section 10 of the U.S. Constitution. This law covered debts contracted before the law was passed. The retroactive portion of the law was ruled to be unconstitutional by a unanimous court, because it impaired the debtors obligation to a contract.

== See also ==
- List of United States Supreme Court cases, volume 17
- Cessio bonorum
