= Vienna Convention on the Law of Treaties Between States and International Organizations or Between International Organizations =

1986 United Nations treaty

States which are signatory or party to the Vienna Convention on the Law of Treaties between States and International Organizations or between International Organizations
Signatories
Parties
- Signed: 21 March 1986
- Location: Vienna
- Effective: not in force
- Condition: Ratification or accession by 35 states
- Signatories: 39
- Parties: 46, among which 34 states
- Depositary: UN Secretary-General
- Languages: Arabic, Chinese, English, French, Russian and Spanish

The Vienna Convention on the Law of Treaties Between States and International Organizations or Between International Organizations (VCLTIO) is an extension of the Vienna Convention on the Law of Treaties which deals with treaties between states. It was developed by the International Law Commission and opened for signature on 21 March 1986.

Article 85 of the Convention provides that it enters into force after ratification or accession by 35 states. As of October 2026, the treaty has been ratified or acceded to by 34 states. As a result, the convention is not in force.

== Parties to the convention ==
34 states have ratified or acceded to the convention: Mexico, Colombia, Argentina, Uruguay, Senegal, Liberia, Gabon, Australia, United Kingdom, Denmark, Sweden, Estonia, Belarus, Moldova, Bulgaria, Cyprus, Greece, Spain, Germany, Netherlands, (Note: The convention is ratified on behalf of the whole kingdom, rather than just the constituent country of the Netherlands.) Belgium, Switzerland, Liechtenstein, Italy, Austria, Croatia, Hungary, Czech Republic, Slovakia, Malta, Albania, Portugal, Palestine and Brazil.

Additionally, there are 12 international organizations that issued formal confirmations of the convention: IAEA, ICAO, Interpol, ILO, IMO, OPCW, CTBTO Preparatory Commission, the UN, UNIDO, UPU, WHO and WIPO.

The signatory states that have not ratified are: Ivory Coast, DR Congo, United States, Bosnia and Herzegovina, South Korea, Japan, Serbia, Montenegro, Morocco, Egypt, Sudan, Burkina Faso, Benin, Zambia, and Malawi. Additionally, there are international organizations that have signed, but not completed their formal confirmation procedures: CoE, FAO, ITU, UNESCO and WMO.

== See also ==
- Vienna Convention on Diplomatic Relations (1961)
- Vienna Convention on Consular Relations (1963)
- Vienna Convention on the Law of Treaties (1969)
- List of Vienna conventions
- Jus tractatuum
