= Reserved powers =

Powers that are neither prohibited nor given by law to any organ of government

Reserved powers, residual powers, or residuary powers are the powers that are neither prohibited to be exercised by an organ of government, nor given by law to any other organ of government. Such powers, as well as a general power of competence, nevertheless may exist because it is impractical to detail in legislation every act allowed to be carried out by the state.

== By country ==
=== Common law countries ===
The United Kingdom and countries whose legal system is based on common law, such as Canada, India, Israel, and Ireland, have similar legal frameworks of reserved powers.

==== Australia ====
In Australia, section 107 of the Australian Constitution preserved all powers not exclusively vested (section 52 and others) in the Commonwealth to still be exercisable by the States. Section 51 provides the Federal Parliament with the power to make laws for the peace, order, and good government of Australia with respect to an enumerated list of powers. These are concurrent powers which may be exercised by both the Commonwealth and the States, but if there is a conflict between the two, the Commonwealth law prevails in accordance with section 109.

In early Australian jurisprudence, the High Court sort to protect as much autonomy for the states by interpretating the Constitution in a way which sought to preserve the reserved powers of the States. This was known as the "reserved powers doctrine". In essence, this doctrine meant the Court would first determine what the reserved powers of the States was before determining whether the Commonwealth had legislative power on a particular subject. To do this the Court would consider whether the Constitution, as a federal compact, intended for the power to be withdrawn from the States and conferred upon the Commonwealth.

This interprative approach to the Constitution was emphatically rejected by the High Court in the Engineers' Case. The Court now insisted on adhering only to the language of the constitutional text read as a whole in its natural sense and in light of the circumstances in which it was made: there was to be no reading in of implications by reference to the presumed intentions of the framers. In particular, since there is no mention of "reserved State powers," only one express inter-governmental immunity (regarding property taxes: section 114), and, an express provision asserting the superiority of valid Commonwealth laws over inconsistent State laws (section 109), there was no longer any room for the doctrine previously asserted in favour of the States.

As a result the Court will first determine the extent of the Commonwealth's legislative power under the Constitution before determining what powers are reserved to the States under section 107.

==== Canada ====
In Canada the reserved powers lie with the federal government.

==== India ====
Article 246 (1) states of the Constitution of India leaves the residuary powers to the Parliament of India by stating that the Parliament has exclusive power to make laws on matters enumerated in Union List. The Entry 97 of the Union List or List I in the Seventh Schedule to the Constitution of India reads: 97. Any other matter not enumerated in List II or List III including any tax not mentioned in either of those Lists.

==== United States ====
In the United States, the Tenth Amendment of the Constitution states that the powers not granted to the federal government are reserved to the states, unless prohibited to the states. This amendment does not refer to powers “explicitly” or “expressly” granted to the federal government, and therefore the federal government possesses many implied powers that are not reserved to the states.

After World War II, the Supreme Court often ruled against parties challenging the powers of Congress per the Tenth Amendment, with exceptions during the Rehnquist Court. The Supreme Court continues to occasionally decide cases striking down federal laws that exceed both the explicit and implied powers of Congress, as in Murphy v. National Collegiate Athletic Association (2018).

In the United States, many powers that are not reserved powers to the states are exclusive federal powers, and thus states are forbidden to exercise them. Alternatively, powers that are not reserved to the states may be concurrent powers that both the states and federal government can exercise at the same time (such as the power to enact taxes to raise revenue).

== See also ==
- Devolved, reserved and excepted matters in the United Kingdom
- Dillon's Rule
- Principle of conferral of the European Union
- Power of the purse
