= Non-recognition =

Non-recognition is the practice and legal obligation not to extend diplomatic recognition to annexations or de facto states created through violation of international law. It is a counterpart to the rejection of right of conquest in modern international law and the jus cogens norm of prohibition on the acquisition of territory through force.
