= Intergovernmental immunity =

Intergovernmental immunity is a legal doctrine in federations that defines the extent to which laws of a federal government and its subnational units can bind one another.

- Intergovernmental immunity (Australia)
- Intergovernmental immunity (United States)

== See also ==
- Interjurisdictional immunity (Canada)
