= McCulloch v. Maryland =

- Supreme Court of the United States

Argued February 21 – March 3, 1819 Decided March 6, 1819
- Full case name: James McCulloch v. The State of Maryland, John James (Note: In the original report of the case, its name is styled M‘Culloch v. The State of Maryland et al., which has led many sources to refer to the case as M'Culloch v. Maryland. However, 18th- and early 19th-century printers often used a "turned" comma to represent a superscript lowercase "c" after a capital "M"; in other words, they used M‘ to represent M^{c}. The original reporter of the case, Henry Wheaton, almost certainly used M'Culloch to indicate McCulloch. Today, many casebooks and legal treatises have accordingly updated "M'Culloch to "McCulloch".)
- Citations: 17 U.S. 316 (more) 4 Wheat. 316; 4 L. Ed. 579; 1819 U.S. LEXIS 320; 4 A.F.T.R. (P-H) 4491; 42 Cont. Cas. Fed. (CCH) ¶ 77,296
- Decision: Opinion

Case history
- Prior: Judgment for John James, Baltimore County Court; affirmed, Maryland Court of Appeals
- Subsequent: None

Holding
- Although the Constitution does not specifically give Congress the power to establish a bank, it delegates the ability to tax and spend. Because a bank is a proper and suitable instrument to assist the operations of the government in the collection and disbursement of the revenue, and because federal laws are supreme over state laws, Maryland had no power to interfere with the bank's operation by taxing it. Maryland Court of Appeals reversed.

Court membership
- Chief Justice John Marshall Associate Justices Bushrod Washington · William Johnson; H. Brockholst Livingston · Thomas Todd; Gabriel Duvall · Joseph Story

Case opinion
- Majority: Marshall, joined by unanimous

Laws applied
- U.S. Const. art. I, § 8, cl. 1, 18

McCulloch v. Maryland, 17 U.S. (4 Wheat.) 316 (1819), is a landmark decision of the Supreme Court of the United States that defined the scope of the U.S. Congress's legislative power and how it relates to the powers of American state legislatures. The dispute in McCulloch involved the legality of the Second Bank of the United States and a tax that the state of Maryland imposed on it. In its ruling, the Supreme Court established firstly that the Necessary and Proper Clause of the U.S. Constitution gives the U.S. federal government certain implied powers necessary and proper for the exercise of the powers enumerated explicitly in the Constitution, and secondly that the American federal government is supreme over the states, and so states' ability to interfere with the federal government is restricted. Since the legislature has the authority to tax and spend, the court held that it therefore has authority to establish a national bank, as being "necessary and proper" to that end.

The state of Maryland had attempted to impede an operation by the Second Bank of the United States through a tax on all notes of banks not chartered in Maryland. Though the law, by its language, was generally applicable to all banks not chartered in Maryland, the Second Bank of the United States was the only out-of-state bank then existing in Maryland, and the law was thus recognized in the court's opinion as having specifically targeted the Bank of the United States. The Court invoked the Necessary and Proper Clause of the Constitution, which allows the federal government to pass laws not expressly provided for in the Constitution's list of enumerated powers of Congress if such laws are necessary and proper to further the powers expressly authorized.

McCulloch has been described as "the most important Supreme Court decision in American history defining the scope of Congress's powers and delineating the relationship between the federal government and the states." The case established two important principles in constitutional law. First, the Constitution grants to Congress implied powers to implement the Constitution's express powers to create a functional national government. Prior to the Supreme Court's decision in McCulloch, the scope of the U.S. government's authority was unclear. Second, state action may not impede valid constitutional exercises of power by the federal government.

== Background ==
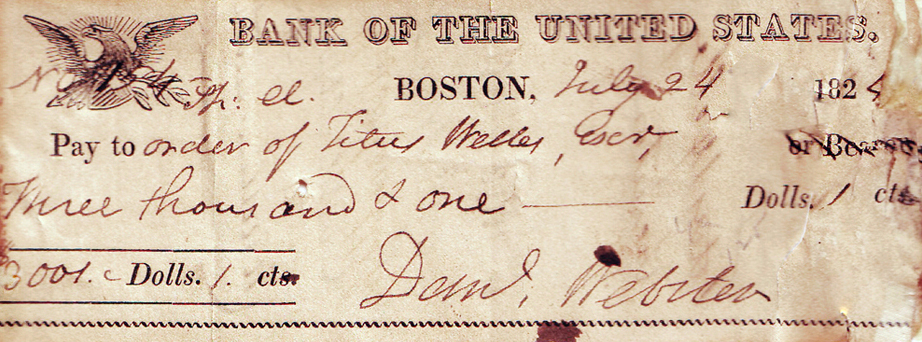
A handwritten bank draft from the Second Bank of the United States, dated July 24, 1824, from Daniel Webster, who argued on behalf of McCulloch and the U.S. government in McCulloch v. Maryland

Almost immediately after the ratification of the U.S. Constitution in 1788, a major public debate arose over whether to establish a national bank for the United States. Upon George Washington's inauguration in 1789 as the first President of the United States, his Secretary of the Treasury, Alexander Hamilton, proposed creating a national bank to regulate American currency and deal with national economic problems. Washington's Secretary of State, Thomas Jefferson, strongly opposed the bank's creation, fearing it would usurp power from the individual states and concentrate it to a dangerous degree in the central federal government. Congress created the First Bank of the United States in 1791 with a 20-year charter, but the issue continued to be controversial. Those who supported Hamilton's vision of a stronger central government eventually formed the Federalist Party, while those who opposed him and supported Jefferson's vision of a decentralized government that focused on states' rights formed the Democratic-Republican Party.

The First Bank's charter expired in 1811 and was not renewed. However, national economic problems in the aftermath of the War of 1812 prompted Congress to pass similar legislation in 1816 to create the Second Bank of the United States. The U.S. government only owned 20 percent of the bank's equity, and many state governments resented the bank for calling in loans it had made to them. Consequently, some states passed laws designed to hinder the bank's operation, while others simply tried to tax it. In 1818, the Maryland General Assembly—Maryland's state legislature—passed a law levying a $15,000 annual tax on any bank operating in Maryland that was issuing notes and bills that were not properly stamped by Maryland's Treasury, the Western Shore Treasury.

James William McCulloch, (Note: Pronounced /məˈkʌlə/ mə-KULL-ə. The case refers to him as "McCulloch" because the court clerk misspelled his name.) a cashier of the Baltimore Branch of the Second Bank of the United States, issued unstamped bank notes to Baltimore resident George Williams. The lawsuit was filed by John James, an informer who sought to collect half of the fine, as provided for by the statute. The Bank was represented by Daniel Webster. The case was appealed to the Maryland Court of Appeals, where the state of Maryland argued that "the Constitution is silent on the subject of banks." It was Maryland's contention that without specific constitutional authorization for the federal government to create a bank, any such creation would be rendered unconstitutional.

The court upheld Maryland. The case was then appealed to the Supreme Court.

== Decision ==
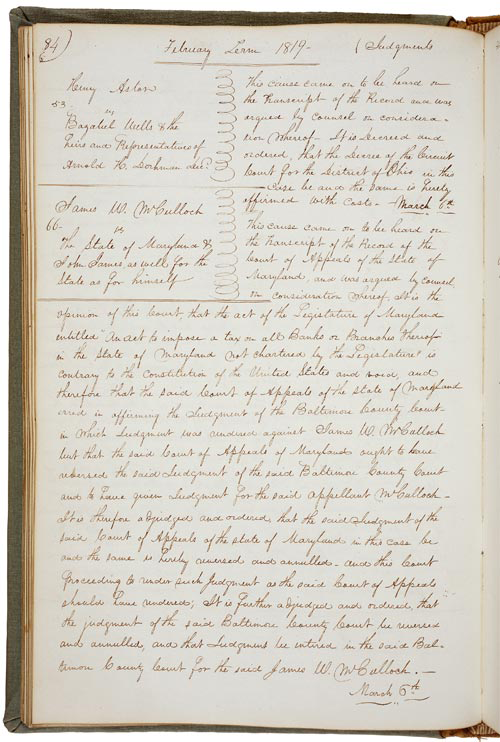
The text of the McCulloch v. Maryland decision, as recorded in the minutes of the Supreme Court

The Court determined that Congress had the power to create the Bank. Chief Justice Marshall supported his conclusion with four main arguments:

Firstly, he argued that historical practice established Congress's power to create the bank. Marshall invoked the creation of the First Bank of the United States in 1791 as authority for the constitutionality of the second bank. The first Congress had enacted the bank after great debate, and it was approved by an executive "with as much persevering talent as any measure has ever experienced, and being supported by arguments which convinced minds as pure and as intelligent as this country can boast."

Secondly, Marshall rebutted the argument that states retain ultimate sovereignty because they ratified the constitution: "The powers of the general government, it has been said, are delegated by the states, who alone are truly sovereign; and must be exercised in subordination to the states, who alone possess supreme dominion." Marshall contended that it was the people who ratified the Constitution and thus the people, not the states, who are sovereign.

Thirdly, Marshall addressed the scope of congressional powers under Article I. The Court broadly described Congress's authority before it addressed the Necessary and Proper Clause. Marshall admitted that the Constitution does not enumerate a power to create a central Bank but said that is not dispositive as to Congress's power to establish such an institution: "In considering this question, then, we must never forget, that it is a constitution we are expounding."

Fourthly, Marshall supported his opinion textually by invoking the Necessary and Proper Clause, which permits Congress to seek an objective while it exercised its enumerated powers as long as that objective is not forbidden by the Constitution. In liberally interpreting the Necessary and Proper Clause, the Court rejected Maryland's narrow interpretation of the clause that the word "necessary" in the clause meant that Congress could pass only laws that were absolutely essential in the execution of its enumerated powers. The Court rejected that argument, on the grounds that many of the enumerated powers of Congress under the Constitution would be useless if only laws deemed essential to a power's execution could be passed. Marshall also noted that the Necessary and Proper Clause is listed within the powers of Congress, not its limitations.

The Court held that the word "necessary" in the Necessary and Proper Clause does not refer therefore to the only way of doing something but applies to various procedures for implementing all constitutionally-established powers: "If the end be legitimate, let it be within the scope of the Constitution, and all means which are appropriate, which are plainly adapted to that end, which are not prohibited, but consist with the letter and spirit of the Constitution, are Constitutional."

That principle had been established many years earlier by Alexander Hamilton:

[A] criterion of what is constitutional, and of what is not so ... is the end, to which the measure relates as a mean. If the end be clearly comprehended within any of the specified powers, and if the measure have an obvious relation to that end, and is not forbidden by any particular provision of the Constitution, it may safely be deemed to come within the compass of the national authority. There is also this further criterion which may materially assist the decision: Does the proposed measure abridge a pre-existing right of any State, or of any individual? If it does not, there is a strong presumption in favour of its constitutionality. ...

Chief Justice Marshall also determined that Maryland could not tax the bank without violating the constitution since, as Marshall commented, "the power to tax involves the power to destroy". The Court thus struck down the tax as an unconstitutional attempt by a state to interfere with a federal institution, in violation of the Supremacy Clause.

The opinion stated that Congress has implied powers, which must be related to the text of the Constitution but do not need to be enumerated within the text.

== Significance ==
The case is considered an important moment in the development of federalism in the United States, articulating a balance between federal powers and state powers. Marshall also explained in the case that the Necessary and Proper Clause does not require all federal laws to be necessary and proper and that federal laws that are enacted directly pursuant to one of the expressed, enumerated powers granted by the Constitution do not need to comply with the Necessary and Proper Clause, which "purport[s] to enlarge, not to diminish the powers vested in the government. It purports to be an additional power, not a restriction on those already granted."

Although McCulloch categorically prevents the federal government from bearing the legal burden of a state tax, this does not mean it is unconstitutional whenever a state tax affects the federal government in any situation. For example, the Supreme Court held in Arizona Department of Revenue v. Blaze Construction Co. that a state can tax the revenue a private government contractor earns by working for the federal government. The economic burden of this tax may fall on the federal government in the form of higher expenses, but the legal burden does not. Therefore, that sort of tax is constitutional.

== Criticism ==
Though Marshall rejected the Tenth Amendment's provision of states' rights arguing that it did not include the word "expressly," unlike the Articles of Confederation, which the Constitution replaced, controversy over the decision's impact on federalism has persisted. Legal scholar Raoul Berger argued that Marshall's interpretation marked an "audacious departure" from the original design of the Constitution, undermining the original federal government structure intended by the Founders. Compact theory also argues that the federal government is a creation of the states and that the states maintain superiority.

Unlike Marshall, his successor, Roger B. Taney, established dual federalism by which separate-but-equal branches of government are believed to be a better option. Legal scholars such as Gary Lawson have contended that Marshall misinterpreted the Necessary and Proper Clause of the Constitution. Lawson argues that Marshall equated "necessary" with "convenient" or "useful," which permitted an overly broad expansion of congressional power.

Legal scholar Nelson Lund has argued that Marshall's ruling, "invited congressional overreach and gave inadequate weight to the powers of the states." Lund and others have argued that the decision set a precedent that gave too much discretion to Congress, expanding its constitutional powers.

== Later history ==
McCulloch v. Maryland was cited in the first substantial constitutional case presented before the High Court of Australia in D'Emden v Pedder (1904), which dealt with similar issues in the Australian Federation. While recognizing American law as not binding on them, the Australian Court nevertheless determined that the McCulloch decision provided the best guideline for the relationship between the Commonwealth federal government, and the Australian states, owing in large part to strong similarities between the American and Australian constitutions.

== See also ==
- List of United States Supreme Court cases, volume 17
- List of landmark court decisions in the United States
- Case of Sutton's Hospital (1612) 77 Eng Rep 960
- Gibbons v. Ogden
