= Title 4 of the United States Code =

U.S. federal statutes on states and national symbols

Title 4 of the United States Code outlines the role of flag of the United States, Great Seal of the United States, Washington, DC, and the states in the United States Code.

== Chapter 1 ==
Chapter 1: The Flag

- § 1 — Flag; stripes and stars on
- § 2 — Same; additional stars
- § 3 — Use of flag for advertising purposes; mutilation of flag
- § 4 — Pledge of allegiance to the flag; manner of delivery
- § 5 — Display and use of flag by civilians; codification of rules and customs; definition
- § 6 — Time and occasions for display
- § 7 — Position and manner of display
- § 8 — Respect for flag
- § 9 — Conduct during hoisting, lowering or passing of flag
- § 10 — Modification of rules and customs by President

Note that 36 U.S.C. § 110 is where Flag Day is codified.

== Chapter 2 ==
Chapter 2: The Seal

- § 41 — Seal of the United States
- § 42 — Same; custody and use of

== Chapter 3 ==
Chapter 3: Seat of the Government

- § 71 — Permanent seat of Government
- § 72 — Public offices; at seat of Government
- § 73 — Same; removal from seat of Government

== Chapter 4 ==
Chapter 4: The States

- § 101 — Oath by members of legislatures and officers
- § 102 — Same; by whom administered
- § 103 — Assent to purchase of lands for forts
- § 104 — Tax on motor fuel sold on military or other reservation
- § 105 — State, and so forth, taxation affecting Federal areas; sales or use tax
- § 106 — Same; income tax
- § 107 — Same; exception of United States, its instrumentalities, and authorized purchases
- § 108 — Same; jurisdiction of United States over Federal areas unaffected
- § 109 — Same; exception of Indians
- § 110 — Same; definitions
- § 111 — Same; taxation affecting Federal employees; income tax
- § 112 — Compacts between States for cooperation in prevention of crime; consent of Congress
- § 113 — Residence of Members of Congress for State income tax laws
- § 114 — Limitation on State income taxation of certain pension income
- § 115 — Limitation on State authority to tax compensation paid to individuals performing services at Fort Campbell, Kentucky
- § 116 — Rules for determining State and local government treatment of charges related to mobile telecommunications services
- § 117 — Sourcing rules
- § 118 — Limitations
- § 119 — Electronic databases for nationwide standard numeric jurisdictional codes
- § 120 — Procedure if no electronic database provided
- § 121 — Correction of erroneous data for place of primary use
- § 122 — Determination of place of primary use
- § 123 — Scope; special rules
- § 124 — Definitions
- § 125 — Nonseverability
- § 126 — No inference

== Chapter 5 ==
Chapter 5: Official Territorial Papers

- § 141 — Collection, preparation and publication
- § 142 — Appointment of experts
- § 143 — Employment and utilization of other personnel; cost of copy reading and indexing
- § 144 — Cooperation of departments and agencies
- § 145 — Printing and distribution
- § 146 — Authorization of appropriations
