= Andean Group =

Andean Group (Spanish: Grupo Andino) is a trade organization in Lima, Peru. In 1969, Bolivia, Chile, Colombia, Ecuador, and Peru established the group by the Treaty of Cartagena. In 1973, Venezuela joined. Chile quit in 1976, as did Peru in 1992. The group created a free trade area called the Andean Pact in 1992.
