= Jus tractatuum =

Right to conclude treaties in international public law and constitutional law

Jus tractatuum (or sometimes jus tractandi) is a Legal Latin term commonly used in public international law and constitutional law that refers to the right to conclude treaties. It is usually referred to in English as treaty-making power. As defined in article 6 of the Vienna Convention on the Law of Treaties, every state possesses the capacity to conclude treaties. International organizations as well as subnational entities of federal states may have treaty-making power as well. Jus tractatuum is linked to the concept of international legal personality.

== International organizations ==
International organizations commonly have the power to conclude treaties as well. A notable example is the European Union, which has concluded a number of free trade agreements. The Vienna Convention on the Law of Treaties between States and International Organizations or between International Organizations aims to be an extension to the Vienna Convention on the Law of Treaties and deals with treaties between one or more states and one or more international organizations and between international organizations. However, this Vienna Convention is not yet into force as of 2013 due to insufficient number of ratifications. One of the most extensive cases on international organizations’ treaty-making power is the Advisory Opinion of the International Court of Justice titled, Reparation for Injuries Suffered in the Service of the United Nations, which details the relationship between sovereignty and the obligation to pay reparation, as well as the criteria to determine international legal personality.

== Federal states ==
Federated states, as part of a federal (sovereign) state, usually do not have the power to conclude treaties—which is determined by the federal constitution. For example, the Contract Clause of the United States Constitution explicitly forbids U.S. states from concluding treaties. The Constitution of Mexico also prohibits its states from making treaties. On the other hand, the Constitution of Belgium for example grants its communities and regions the power to make treaties. The Länder of Germany and Austria and the cantons of Switzerland can make treaties within their respective competencies.

== See also ==
- Treaty Clause
- Full Powers
- Plenipotentiary
- International legal system
