= Implied powers =

Powers implicitly authorized by the U.S. Constitution

In the United States, implied powers are powers that, although not directly stated in the Constitution, are indirectly given based on expressed powers.

== History ==
When George Washington asked Alexander Hamilton to defend the constitutionality of the First Bank of the United States against the protests of Thomas Jefferson, James Madison, and Attorney General Edmund Randolph, Hamilton produced what has now become the doctrine of implied powers. Hamilton argued that the sovereign duties of a government implied the right to use means adequate to its ends. Although the United States government was sovereign only as to certain objects, it was impossible to define all the means it should use, because it was impossible for the founders to anticipate all future exigencies. Hamilton noted that the "general welfare clause" and the "necessary and proper clause" gave elasticity to the Constitution. Hamilton won the argument and Washington signed the bank bill into law.

Another instance of the usage of implied powers was during the Louisiana Purchase, where, in 1803, the United States was offered the opportunity to purchase French territory in continental North America. James Monroe was sent by Thomas Jefferson to France to negotiate, with permission to spend up to $10 million on the port of New Orleans and parts of Florida. However, an agreement to purchase the entirety of continental French territory for $15 million was reached instead, even though this far exceeded the authorized $10 million spending cap. Although Jefferson’s decision to purchase the Louisiana territory would ultimately be widely popular, it was not known to constitutional lawyers, nor even to Jefferson himself, whether he had had the legal authority to negotiate the price of the territory (ultimately violating his stipulated budget) without the approval of Congress. In the end, the notion of implied powers was offered and accepted as justification for finishing the deal.

== Case law ==
Later, directly borrowing from Hamilton, Chief Justice John Marshall invoked the implied powers of government in the United States Supreme Court case, McCulloch v. Maryland. In 1816, the United States Congress passed legislation creating the Second Bank of the United States. The state of Maryland attempted to tax the bank. The state argued the United States Constitution did not explicitly grant Congress the power to establish banks. In 1819, the Court decided against the state of Maryland. Chief Justice Marshall argued that Congress had the right to establish the bank, as the Constitution grants to Congress certain implied powers beyond those explicitly stated.

In the case of the United States government, implied powers are powers Congress exercises that the Constitution does not explicitly define, but are necessary and proper to execute the powers. The legitimacy of these Congressional powers is derived from the Taxing and Spending Clause, the Necessary and Proper Clause, and the Commerce Clause.

Implied powers are those that can reasonably be assumed to flow from express powers, though not explicitly mentioned.

== International law ==
This theory has flown from domestic constitutional law to international law, and European Union institutions have accepted the basics of the implied powers theory.

== See also ==
- Substantive due process, implicit due process rights
