= Necessary and Proper Clause =

Clause of the U.S. Constitution regarding Congressional powers

The Necessary and Proper Clause, also known as the Elastic Clause, is a clause in Article I, Section 8 of the United States Constitution:

The Congress shall have Power... To make all Laws which shall be necessary and proper for carrying into Execution the foregoing Powers, and all other Powers vested by this Constitution in the Government of the United States, or in any Department or Officer thereof.

Since the landmark decision McCulloch v. Maryland, the US Supreme Court has ruled that this clause grants implied powers to the US Congress in addition to its enumerated powers.

== Background ==
According to the Articles of Confederation, "each state retains its sovereignty, freedom, and independence, and every power, jurisdiction, and right, which is not by this Confederation expressly delegated" (emphasis added). Thus, the Continental Congress had no powers incidental to those "expressly delegated" by the Articles of Confederation. By contrast, the Necessary and Proper Clause expressly confers incidental powers upon Congress; no other clause in the Constitution does so by itself.

The draft clause provoked controversy during discussions on the proposed constitution, and its inclusion became a focal point of criticism for those opposed to ratification of the constitution. Anti-Federalists expressed concern that the clause would grant the federal government boundless power, but Federalists argued that the clause would permit only execution of powers that had been granted by the constitution. Alexander Hamilton spoke vigorously for the second interpretation in Federalist No. 33. At the time, James Madison concurred with Hamilton and argued in Federalist No. 44 that without the clause, the constitution would be a "dead letter". At the Virginia Ratifying Convention, Patrick Henry took the opposing view by saying that the clause would lead to limitless federal power, which would inevitably menace individual liberty.

== National bank ==
For several decades after the Constitution was ratified, interpretation of the Necessary and Proper Clause continued to be a powerful bone of contention between the Democratic-Republican Party, the Federalist Party, and several other political parties. The first practical example of that contention came in 1791, when Hamilton used the clause to defend the constitutionality of the new First Bank of the United States, the first federal bank in the new nation's history. Concerned that monied aristocrats in the North would take advantage of the bank to exploit the South, Madison argued that Congress lacked the constitutional authority to charter a bank. Hamilton countered that the bank was a reasonable means of carrying out powers related to taxation and the borrowing of funds and claimed that the clause applied to activities that were reasonably related to constitutional powers, not only those that were absolutely necessary to carry out said powers. To embarrass Madison, his contrary claims from the Federalist Papers were read aloud in Congress:

No axiom is more clearly established in law or in reason than wherever the end is required, the means are authorized; wherever a general power to do a thing is given, every particular power for doing it is included.

Eventually, Southern opposition to the bank and to Hamilton's plan to have the federal government assume the war debts of the states was mollified by the transfer of the nation's capital from its temporary seat in Philadelphia to Washington, DC, a more southerly permanent seat on the Potomac, and the bill, along with the establishment of a national mint, was passed by Congress and signed by President George Washington.

=== McCulloch v. Maryland ===
The clause, as justification for the creation of a national bank, was put to the test in 1819 during McCulloch v. Maryland in which Maryland had attempted to impede the operations of the Second Bank of the United States by imposing a prohibitive tax on out-of-state banks, the Second Bank of the United States being the only one. In the case, the Court ruled against Maryland in an opinion written by Chief Justice John Marshall, Hamilton's longtime Federalist ally. Marshall stated that the Constitution did not explicitly give permission to create a federal bank, but it conferred upon Congress an implied power to do so under the Necessary and Proper Clause so that Congress could realize or fulfill its express taxing and spending powers. The case reaffirmed Hamilton's view that legislation reasonably related to express powers was constitutional. Marshall wrote:

We admit, as all must admit, that the powers of the Government are limited, and that its limits are not to be transcended. But we think the sound construction of the Constitution must allow to the national legislature that discretion with respect to the means by which the powers it confers are to be carried into execution which will enable that body to perform the high duties assigned to it in the manner most beneficial to the people. Let the end be legitimate, let it be within the scope of the Constitution, and all means which are appropriate, which are plainly adapted to that end, which are not prohibited, but consistent with the letter and spirit of the Constitution, are constitutional.

McCulloch v. Maryland held that federal laws could be necessary without being "absolutely necessary" and noted, "The clause is placed among the powers of Congress, not among the limitations on those powers." At the same time, the Court retained the power of judicial review established in Marbury v. Madison by declaring that it had the power to strike down laws that departed from those powers: "Should Congress, in the execution of its powers, adopt measures which are prohibited by the Constitution, or should Congress, under the pretext of executing its powers, pass laws for the accomplishment of objects not intrusted [sic] to the Government, it would become the painful duty of this tribunal, should a case requiring such a decision come before it, to say that such an act was not the law of the land."

As Marshall put it, the Necessary and Proper Clause "purport[s] to enlarge, not to diminish the powers vested in the government. It purports to be an additional power, not a restriction on those already granted." Without that clause, there would have been a dispute about whether the express powers imply incidental powers, but the clause resolved that dispute by making those incidental powers be expressed, instead of implied.

== Later history ==
In a related case after the American Civil War, the clause was employed, in combination with other enumerated powers, to give the federal government virtually complete control over currency.

The clause has been paired with the Commerce Clause to provide the constitutional basis for a wide variety of federal laws. For instance, various reforms involved in the New Deal were found to be necessary and proper enactments of the objective of regulating interstate commerce.

The influence of the Necessary and Proper Clause and its broader interpretation under McCulloch v. Maryland (1819) in American jurisprudence can be seen in cases generally to be thought to involve simply the Commerce Clause.

In Wickard v. Filburn (1942), the Supreme Court upheld a federal statute making it a crime for a farmer to produce more wheat than was allowed under price and production controls, even if the excess production was for the farmer's own personal consumption. The Necessary and Proper Clause was used to justify the regulation of production and consumption.

Also, in addition to both clauses being used to uphold federal laws that affect economic activity, they also were used to justify federal criminal laws as well. For example, Congress in the Federal Kidnapping Act (1932) made it a federal crime to transport a kidnapped person across state lines because the transportation would be an act of interstate activity over which the Congress has power. It has also provided justification for a wide range of criminal laws relating to interference with the federal government's rightful operation, including federal laws against assaulting or murdering federal employees.

In National Federation of Independent Business v. Sebelius (2012), the Supreme Court ruled that the individual mandate of the Patient Protection and Affordable Care Act cannot be upheld under the Necessary and Proper Clause. Chief Justice John Roberts ruled that the mandate cannot "be sustained under the Necessary and Proper Clause as an integral part of the Affordable Care Act's other reforms. Each of this Court's prior cases upholding laws under that Clause involved exercises of authority derivative of, and in service to, a granted power. ... The individual mandate, by contrast, vests Congress with the extraordinary ability to create the necessary predicate to the exercise of an enumerated power and draw within its regulatory scope those who would otherwise lie outside it. Even if the individual mandate is 'necessary' to the Affordable Care Act's other reforms, such an expansion of federal power is not a 'proper' means for making those reforms effective."

According to its proponents, the ruling returns the clause to its original interpretation, outlined by John Marshall in McCulloch v. Maryland. According to David Kopel, the clause "simply restates the background principle that Congress can exercise powers which are merely 'incidental' to Congress's enumerated powers".

== Name of the clause ==
The specific term "Necessary and Proper Clause" was coined in 1926 by Associate Justice Louis Brandeis, writing for the majority in the Supreme Court decision in Lambert v. Yellowley, 272 U.S. 581 (1926), which upheld a law restricting medicinal use of alcohol as a necessary and proper exercise of power under the 18th Amendment, which established Prohibition.

The phrase has become the label of choice for this constitutional clause. It was universally adopted by the courts and received Congress's imprimatur in Title 50 of the United States Code, Section 1541(b) (1994), in the purpose and policy of the War Powers Resolution.

== See also ==
- McCulloch v. Maryland
- United States v. Comstock
- Wickard v. Filburn
- Federalist No. 33
- Federalist No. 44
