= Jus legationis =

Right of legation (Latin ius legationis) is one of the basic attributes of state sovereignty and denotes the power of subject of international law to send its own (active legation) and receive others' (passive legation) diplomatic representatives, but only with the mutual consent of those concerned.

It is the right of a subject of international law to maintain or not maintain diplomatic relations with another subject of international law. The right of legation does not create an obligation to send its representatives to other states and to receive foreign representatives. Indeed, the establishment of diplomatic relations is based on mutual consent.

== Works cited ==
- Satow, Ernest (2011). "The Right of Legation". In Satow, Ernest (ed.). A Guide to Diplomatic Practice. Cambridge Library Collection - British and Irish History, General. Cambridge: Cambridge University Press. pp. 175–180. doi:10.1017/CBO9780511995194.014. ISBN 9780511995194.
