= Abraham Lincoln's first inaugural address =

1861 speech by Abraham Lincoln

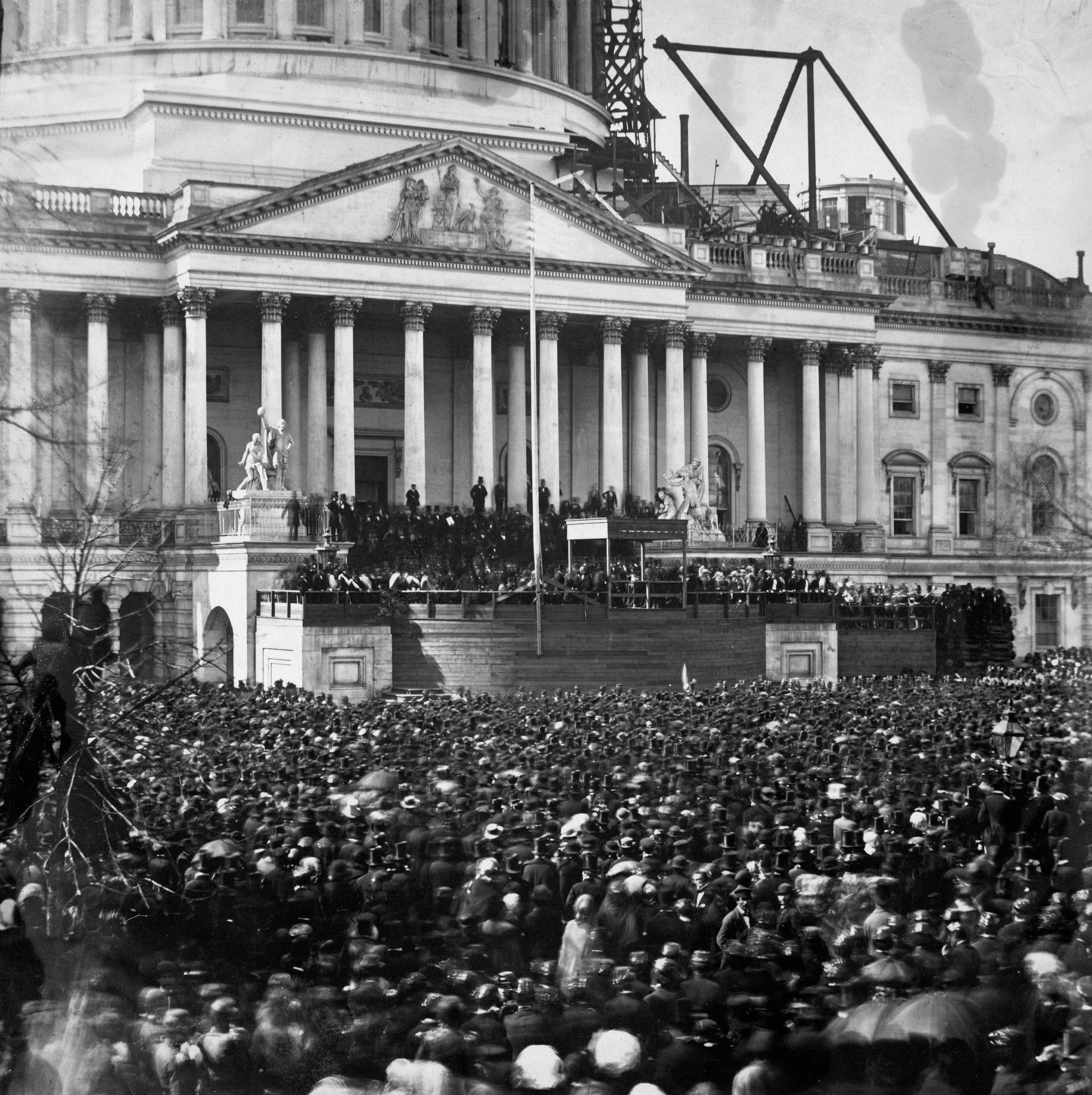
Lincoln's swearing-in at the partially finished U.S. Capitol in Washington, D.C., on March 4, 1861

Abraham Lincoln's first inaugural address was delivered on Monday, March 4, 1861, as part of his taking of the oath of office for his first term as the sixteenth president of the United States. The speech, delivered at the United States Capitol, was primarily addressed to the people of the South and was intended to succinctly state Lincoln's intended policies and desires toward that section, where seven states had seceded from the Union and formed the Confederate States of America.

Written in a spirit of reconciliation toward the seceded states, Lincoln's inaugural address touched on several topics: first, a pledge to "hold, occupy, and possess the property and places belonging to the government"; second, a statement that the Union would not interfere with slavery where it existed; and third, a promise that while he would never be the first to attack, any use of arms against the United States would be regarded as rebellion and met with force. The inauguration took place on the eve of the American Civil War, which began soon after with the Confederate attack on Fort Sumter on April 12.

Lincoln denounced secession as anarchy and said that majority rule had to be balanced by constitutional restraints in the American system of republicanism:

A majority held in restraint by constitutional checks and limitations, and always changing easily, with deliberate changes of popular opinions and sentiments, is the only true sovereign of a free people.

Desperately wishing to avoid a civil war, Lincoln ended with this plea:

I am loath to close. We are not enemies, but friends. We must not be enemies. Though passion may have strained it must not break our bonds of affection. The mystic chords of memory, stretching from every battlefield and patriot grave to every living heart and hearthstone all over this broad land, will yet swell the chorus of the Union, when again touched, as surely they will be, by the better angels of our nature.

== Background ==
Lincoln was chosen to be the Republican candidate in the 1860 presidential election, which he won on November 6 with 180 electoral votes. Between this time and his inauguration on March 4, seven Deep South cotton states—South Carolina, Mississippi, Georgia, Florida, Alabama, Louisiana and Texas—seceded from the Union. Lincoln's predecessor, James Buchanan, had deplored secession as illegal, but had insisted that the federal government could do nothing to stop it. The entire nation, together with several interested foreign powers, awaited the president-elect's words on what exactly his policy toward the new Confederacy would be.

=== Lincoln's motivation ===
Lincoln's speech was an effort to answer this question, as well as an attempt to reach out to what he called his "dissatisfied fellow-countrymen" in an effort to avoid the coming conflict. He had held to a strict policy of silence during the months leading up to his inauguration, carefully avoiding making any statements that could be misconstrued by either the North or the South, prior to his becoming the leader of the nation. Lincoln's intention was that no statement of his specific policy toward the South should be made available before he had taken office. Those privy to the speech's possible contents were sworn to silence, and Lincoln's draft was kept locked in the safe of the Illinois State Journal newspaper.

Lincoln composed his address in the back room of his brother-in-law's store in his hometown of Springfield, Illinois, using four basic references: Henry Clay's 1850 speech on compromise, Daniel Webster's reply to Hayne, Andrew Jackson's proclamation against nullification, and the United States Constitution.

=== Edits from William Seward ===
Lincoln's soon-to-be Secretary of State, William H. Seward, later made suggestions that softened the original tone somewhat and contributed to the speech's famous closing. Lincoln's speech had originally ended with the sentence, "With you, and not with me, is the solemn question of 'Shall it be peace or a sword?'" Seward wrote that Lincoln should end his speech with "Some words of affection — some of calm and cheerful confidence," both to calm fears in the east, and to "remove prejudice and passion in the South." Offering a concrete suggestion, Seward proposed this final paragraph:

I close. We are not, we must not be, aliens or enemies, but fellow-countrymen and brethren. Although passion has strained our bonds of affection too hardly, they must not, I am sure they will not, be broken. The mystic chords which, proceeding from so many battlefields and so many patriot graves, pass through all the hearts and all hearths in this broad continent of ours, will yet again harmonize in their ancient music when breathed upon by the guardian angel of the nation.

=== Andrew Jackson's influence ===
Lincoln borrowed language and argumentation from Andrew Jackson's Nullification Proclamation, which Jackson issued in December 1832 in response to South Carolina's Ordinance of Nullification. Lincoln read Jackson's Nullification Proclamation at least twice between his election and inauguration: once in November 1860, just one week after the election, and again in January 1861, as he was drafting his inaugural address. At the time, observers viewed the Nullification Crisis as the "preeminent historical analogue to the Secession Crisis." In August 1860, Kentucky abolitionist Cassius Clay urged Lincoln to “put Andrew Jackson’s ‘union’ speech in your inaugural address,” and in November, Lincoln told his personal secretaries John Nicolay and John Hay that "[t]he right of a State to secede is not an open or debatable question" as it had been "fully discussed in Jackson’s time, and denied not only by him, but by the vote of Congress."

Jackson's Proclamation influenced "both the substance and style" of Lincoln's address. Substantively, Lincoln repeated Jackson's arguments about the unconstitutionality of secession. Discussing both fundamental law and America's constitutional history, Jackson had argued that the Constitution forbade secession because it "perpetuated" the Union and tied the American people together in a "perpetual bond." Similarly, Lincoln argued that "in contemplation of universal law, and of the Constitution, the Union of these states is perpetual." Lincoln also expanded on Jackson's conception of "constitutional democracy as a fragile enterprise that requires political minorities to accept and submit to majority rule." Stylistically, both Jackson and Lincoln portrayed the South as the aggressors; each of them "rhetorically downplayed his degree of agency by using terms of obligation rather than decision, in order to claim the moral high ground and preemptively cast his opponents as the belligerents."

The Proclamation's influence on the First Inaugural can be seen most directly by comparing their arguments for why compact theory does not justify secession, and the language in their penultimate paragraphs:

	Jackson's Nullification Proclamation	Lincoln's First Inaugural Address
Compact theory	"Because the Union was formed by compact, it is said the parties to that compact may, when they feel themselves aggrieved, depart from it; but it is precisely because it is a compact that they cannot. A compact is an agreement or binding obligation… [E]ven if…the national Constitution had been formed by compact, there would be no right in any one State to exonerate itself from the obligation."	"If the United States be not a government proper, but an association of States in the nature of contract merely, can it, as a contract, be peaceably unmade by less than all the parties who made it? One party to a contract may violate it—break it, so to speak—but does it not require all to lawfully rescind it?"
Penultimate paragraph	"Fellow-citizens! the momentous case is before you. On your undivided support of your government depends the decision of the great question it involves, whether your sacred Union will be preserved, and the blessing it secures to us as one people shall be perpetuated."	"In your hands, my dissatisfied fellow-countrymen, and not in mine, is the momentous issue of civil war. The Government will not assail you. You can have no conflict without being yourselves the aggressors."

=== James Madison's influence ===
Seward's text was based, in part, on James Madison's warnings against the dangers of civil conflict in his Federalist No. 14, originally addressed to the people of New York. Seward had consulted the early Federalist papers only six weeks earlier, while composing a speech for the Senate, and reflecting on the dangers of civil war.

Lincoln for his part took Seward's draft of the closing and gave it a more poetic, lyrical tone, making changes such as revising Seward's "I close. We are not, we must not be aliens or enemies but fellow countrymen and brethren" to "I am loath to close. We are not enemies, but friends. We must not be enemies."

== Journey to Washington ==
An entourage of family and friends left Springfield, Illinois with Lincoln on February 11, traveling by train to Washington, D.C., for the inauguration. This group included Lincoln's wife, three sons, and brother-in-law, as well as John G. Nicolay, John M. Hay, Ward Hill Lamon, David Davis, Norman B. Judd, and Edwin Vose Sumner.

For the next ten days, Lincoln traveled widely throughout the North, stopping in Indianapolis, Columbus, Pittsburgh, Cleveland, Buffalo, Albany, New York City, and Philadelphia, where on the afternoon of February 21 he pulled into Kensington Station. Lincoln took an open carriage to the Continental Hotel (now known as The Franklin Residences and located at 834 Chestnut Street in Center City Philadelphia, with almost 100,000 spectators waiting to catch a glimpse of the president-elect. There, he met Mayor Alexander Henry, and delivered some remarks to the crowd outside from the Continental Hotel balcony. Lincoln then continued on to Harrisburg.

During the trip, Lincoln's son Robert was entrusted by his father with a carpetbag containing the draft of his first inaugural. At one stop, Robert mistakenly handed the bag to a hotel clerk, who deposited it behind his desk with several others. A visibly chagrined Lincoln was compelled to go behind the desk and try his key in several bags until finally locating the one containing his speech. Thereafter, Lincoln kept the bag in his possession until his arrival in Washington, D.C.

Because of an alleged assassination conspiracy, Lincoln traveled through Baltimore, Maryland on a special train in the middle of the night before finally completing his journey to the capital.

== Summary ==
Lincoln opened his speech by first indicating that he would not touch on "those matters of administration about which there is no special anxiety or excitement." The remainder of the speech would address the concerns of Southerners, who were apprehensive that "by the accession of a Republican Administration their property and their peace and personal security are to be endangered." Lincoln emphatically denied this assertion, and invited his listeners to consider his past speeches on the subject of slavery, together with the platform adopted by the Republican Party, which explicitly guaranteed the right of each individual state to decide for itself on the subject of slavery, together with the right of each state to be free from coercion of any kind from other states, or the federal government. He went on to address several other points of particular interest at the time:

1. Slavery: Lincoln stated emphatically that he had "no purpose, directly or indirectly, to interfere with the institution of slavery in the States where it exists. I believe I have no lawful right to do so, and I have no inclination to do so."
2. Legal status of the South: He asserted that as he had just taken an oath "to preserve, protect, and defend the United States Constitution", this oath enjoined him to see that the laws of the Union were faithfully executed in all states—including those that had seceded.
3. Use of force: Lincoln promised that there would be no use of force against the South, unless it proved necessary for him to fulfill his obligation to "hold, occupy, and possess the property and places" belonging to the federal government, and to collect legal duties and imposts. However, if the South chose to actively take up arms against the government, their insurrection would meet a firm and forceful response.
4. Secession: Referring to words in the preamble to the Constitution, Lincoln stated that the Constitution was established "to form a more perfect union" than the Articles of Confederation and Perpetual Union had effected. Because the union established under the Articles was explicitly perpetual in name and text, the union under the Constitution was also perpetual. He added that even if the Constitution were to be construed as a simple contract, it could not be legally rescinded without an agreement between all parties, meaning all of the states, North and South.
5. Protection of slavery: Lincoln explicitly stated that he had no objection to the proposed Corwin Amendment to the Constitution, which had already been approved by both houses of the United States Congress. This amendment would have formally protected slavery in those states in which it already existed, and assured to each state the right to establish or repudiate it. Lincoln indicated that he thought that this right was already protected in the original Constitution, and that the Corwin Amendment merely reiterated what it already contained.
6. Slavery in the territories: Lincoln asserted that nothing in the Constitution expressly said what either could or could not be done regarding slavery in the territories. He indicated his willingness to enforce the Fugitive Slave Act, so long as free blacks could be protected from being kidnapped and illegally sold into slavery through its misuse.
7. The postal service: The U.S. mails would continue to operate throughout the South, "unless repelled."
8. Federal offices in the South: With no professional civil service in operation during this period of American history, Lincoln promised that he would not use the spoils system to appoint Northern office-holders to federal offices, such as postmasterships, located in the Southern states. Instead, he said he would "forego the use of such offices" rather than force "obnoxious strangers" upon the South.

Lincoln concluded his speech with a plea for calm and cool deliberation in the face of mounting tension throughout the nation. He assured the rebellious states that the federal government would never initiate any conflict with them, and indicated his own conviction that "touched" once more by "the better angels of our nature," the "mystic chords of memory" North and South would "yet swell the chorus of the Union."

== Reaction ==
While much of the Northern press largely praised Lincoln's inaugural address, the new Confederacy mainly responded with silence. The Charleston Mercury was an exception: it excoriated Lincoln's address as manifesting "insolence" and "brutality," and attacked the Union government as 'a mobocratic empire'. The speech also did not impress other states which were considering secession from the Union. Indeed, after Fort Sumter was attacked and Lincoln declared a formal state of insurrection, four more states—Virginia, North Carolina, Tennessee and Arkansas—purported to secede from the Union and joined the Confederacy.

Modern writers and historians generally consider the speech to be a masterpiece and one of the finest presidential inaugural addresses, with the final lines having earned particularly lasting renown in American culture. Literary and political analysts likewise have praised the speech's eloquent prose and epideictic quality.

The ending of the speech, starting with "I am moved to closed," was featured as the prelude to the song "The Battle of Hampton Road" on the album The Monitor by the New Jersey punk rock band Titus Andronicus.

== See also ==
- Lincoln's second inaugural address
- Abraham Lincoln 1861 presidential inauguration
