= Tariff of 1833 =

United States tariff to resolve the Nullification Crisis

- Other short titles: Compromise Tariff of 1833; Compromise Act
- Long title: An Act to modify the act of the fourteenth of July, one thousand eight hundred and thirty-two, and all other acts imposing duties on imports
- Nicknames: Compromise Tariff of 1833
- Enacted by: the 22nd United States Congress
- Effective: March 2, 1833

Citations
- Statutes at Large: 4 Stat. 629

Codification
- Acts amended: Tariff of 1832
- Acts repealed: Tariff of 1842

Legislative history
- Introduced in the House of Representatives by Henry Clay and John C. Calhoun (Brokers) on February 12, 1833; Passed the House of Representatives on February 25, 1833 (119–85); Passed the Senate on March 1, 1833 (29–16); Signed into law by President Andrew Jackson on March 2, 1833

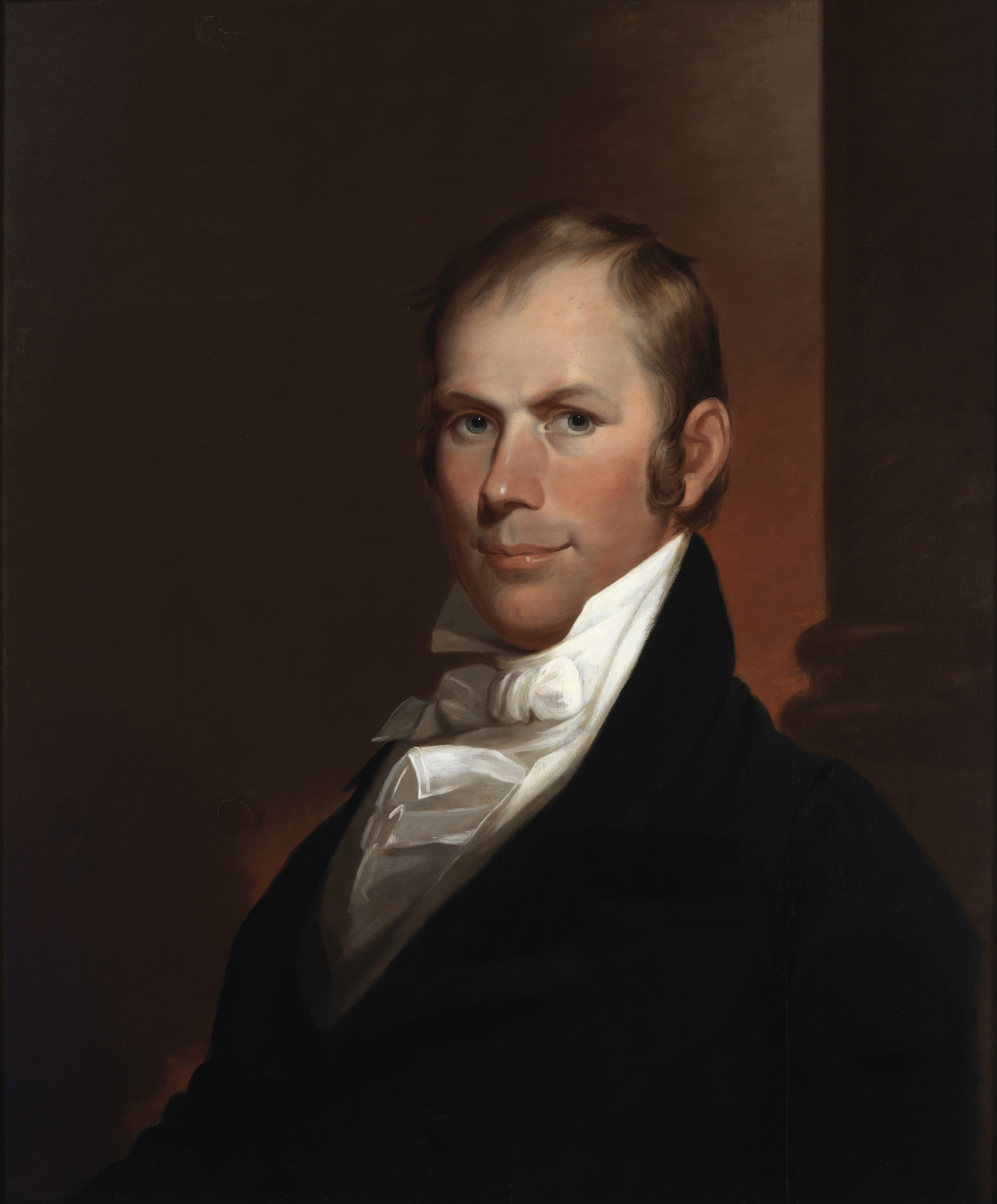
Senator Henry Clay

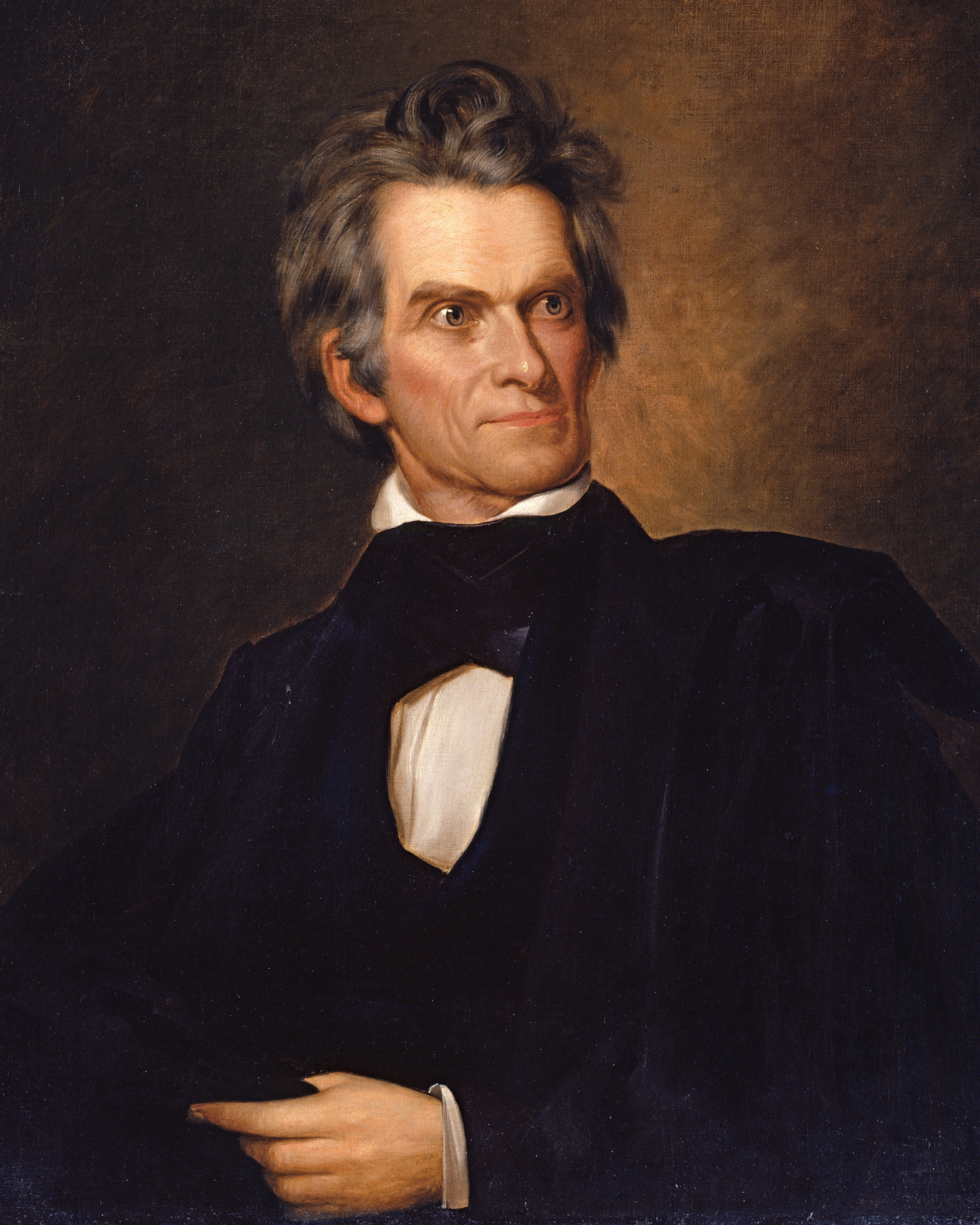
Senator John C. Calhoun

The Tariff of 1833 (also known as the Compromise Tariff of 1833, ch. 55, 4 Stat. 629), enacted on March 2, 1833, was proposed by Henry Clay and John C. Calhoun as a resolution to the Nullification Crisis. Enacted under Andrew Jackson's presidency, it was adopted to gradually reduce the rates following Southerners' objections to the protectionism found in the Tariff of 1832 and the 1828 Tariff of Abominations; the tariffs had prompted South Carolina to threaten secession from the Union. This Act stipulated that import taxes would gradually be cut over the next decade until, by 1842, they matched the levels set in the Tariff of 1816—an average of 20%. The compromise reductions lasted only two months into their final stage before protectionism was reinstated by the Black Tariff of 1842.

== Background ==
=== The Tariff of 1828 ===
The Tariff of 1828, enacted on May 19, 1828, was a protective tariff passed by the U.S. Congress. It was the highest tariff in U.S. peacetime history up to that point, enacting a 62% tax on 92% of all imported goods. The goal of the tariff was to protect northern U.S. industries by placing a tax on low-priced imported goods, which had been driving northern industries out of business. Nevertheless, the South strongly resisted the Tariff of 1828 for several reasons. Firstly, they were forced to pay higher prices on goods that the region did not produce, and secondly, the reduced importation of British goods made it difficult for the British to pay for cotton imported from the South. In essence, the South was simultaneously forced to pay more for goods and to face reduced income from sales of raw materials. These unfortunate results caused many in the South to refer to the Tariff of 1828 as the Tariff of Abominations.

Vice-President John C. Calhoun opposed the tariff and anonymously authored a pamphlet called the South Carolina Exposition and Protest, in when 1828, since many figured the tariff would be reduced.

=== The Tariff of 1832 ===
Nevertheless, Andrew Jackson's administration did not address the tariff concerns until July 14, 1832, when Jackson signed into law the Tariff of 1832. This tariff, written mostly by former President John Quincy Adams, reduced tariffs to resolve the conflict created by the Tariff of 1828. However, while Northerners essentially saw the tariff as a settlement, many Southerners mostly saw it as unsatisfactory and needing improvement. In particular, the state of South Carolina vehemently opposed the tariff, leading to the Nullification Crisis.

=== The Nullification Crisis ===
Disappointed by the Tariff of Abominations and the Tariff of 1832, the South Carolina government declared that the Tariff of 1828 and the Tariff of 1832 were unconstitutional and therefore unenforceable within the state of South Carolina. Jackson issued the Proclamation to the People of South Carolina, in which he called the positions of the nullifiers as "impractical absurdity." He provided this concise statement of his belief:

"I consider, then, the power to annul a law of the United States, assumed by one State, incompatible with the existence of the Union, contradicted expressly by the letter of the Constitution, unauthorized by its spirit, inconsistent with every principle on which It was founded, and destructive of the great object for which it was formed."

Jackson went on to warn nullifiers that their actions could lead to war:

"But the dictates of a high duty oblige me solemnly to announce that you cannot succeed. The laws of the United States must be executed. I have no discretionary power on the subject – my duty is emphatically pronounced in the Constitution. Those who told you that you might peaceably prevent their execution, deceived you – they could not have been deceived themselves. They know that a forcible opposition could alone prevent the execution of the laws, and they know that such opposition must be repelled. Their object is disunion, but be not deceived by names; disunion, by armed force, is TREASON. Are you really ready to incur its guilt? If you are, on the head of the instigators of the act be the dreadful consequences – on their heads be the dishonor, but on yours may fall the punishment – on your unhappy State will inevitably fall all the evils of the conflict you force upon the government of your country. "

The state, ready to defend itself from the government, began making military preparations to resist federal enforcement. Meanwhile, Congress passed the Force Bill, which granted Jackson the ability to use whatever force necessary to enforce federal tariffs.

== The Tariff of 1833 ==
Shortly after the Force Bill was passed through Congress, Henry Clay and John C. Calhoun proposed The Tariff of 1833, also known as the Compromise Tariff, to resolve the Nullification Crisis. The bill was very similar to the Tariff of 1832, but with a few exceptions. Most importantly, the Tariff of 1833 guaranteed that all tariff rates above 20% would be reduced by one tenth every two years with the final reductions back to 20% coming in 1842. This essentially forced import tariffs to gradually drop over the next decade, pleasing South Carolina and other Southern states that depended on cheap imports.

In addition, the Tariff of 1833 had some other notable impacts. First, it allowed many raw materials used by American industry to be admitted completely free of duty. In addition, it stated that all duties must be paid in cash, with no credit allowed the importing merchant. Some claimed that this was equivalent to an additional 5 percent on tariff rates.

Ultimately, South Carolina and the rest of the United States would accept the Tariff of 1833, and warfare between the South Carolina army and the Union was avoided. Both sides received some benefit from the deal. South Carolina now had a much more agreeable tariff and did not have to risk lives to protect its economy, and the United States government, through the Force Act, was given the power to use force to enforce tariffs.

Many believe that were it not for the Force Act, South Carolina may have continued its Nullification policies because the Force Act gave the United States government the ability to use military force to enforce tariffs and other economic policies, which posed a clear threat to South Carolina. Though the exact impact of the Force Act on South Carolina's decision to accept the Tariff of 1833 cannot be measured, undoubtedly, it made fighting for nullification a potentially devastating choice. Ultimately, the House passed the Tariff of 1833 by a vote of 119–85 and the Senate passed it by a vote of 29–16.

House Vote on Tariff of 1833	For	Against
New England (Massachusetts, Connecticut, Rhode Island, Vermont, New Hampshire, Maine)	36	1
Middle States (New York, New Jersey, Pennsylvania, Delaware)	53	6
West (Ohio, Indiana, Illinois, Missouri, Kentucky)	22	5
South (South Carolina, Mississippi, Louisiana, Georgia, Virginia, North Carolina, Tennessee, Alabama, Maryland)	38	35
Total	149	47
Free States	102	8
Slave States	47	39

== Aftermath ==
The Tariff of 1833 was ultimately abandoned in favor of the Black Tariff of 1842, and protectionism was reinstated. Average tariff rates nearly doubled from the initial 20% target for 1842 to about 40%, and the percentage of dutiable goods jumped from about 50% of all imports to over 85% of all imports. For some goods, such as those made with iron, the import tax constituted about two-thirds of the overall price of the goods. Unsurprisingly, the impact of the Black Tariff of 1842 was immediate; as the cost of imports jumped, a sharp decline in international trade occurred in 1843.

== See also ==
- Force Bill
- Tariffs in the second Trump administration
