= Force Bill =

1833 United States law

- Long title: An Act further to provide for the collection of duties on imports
- Nicknames: Bloody Bill
- Enacted by: the 22nd United States Congress
- Effective: March 2, 1833

Citations
- Statutes at Large: 4 Stat. 632

Legislative history
- Introduced in the Senate by William Wilkins (D–PA) on January 21, 1833; Passed the Senate on February 20, 1833 (32–1); Passed the House on March 1, 1833 (149–47); Signed into law by President Andrew Jackson on March 2, 1833

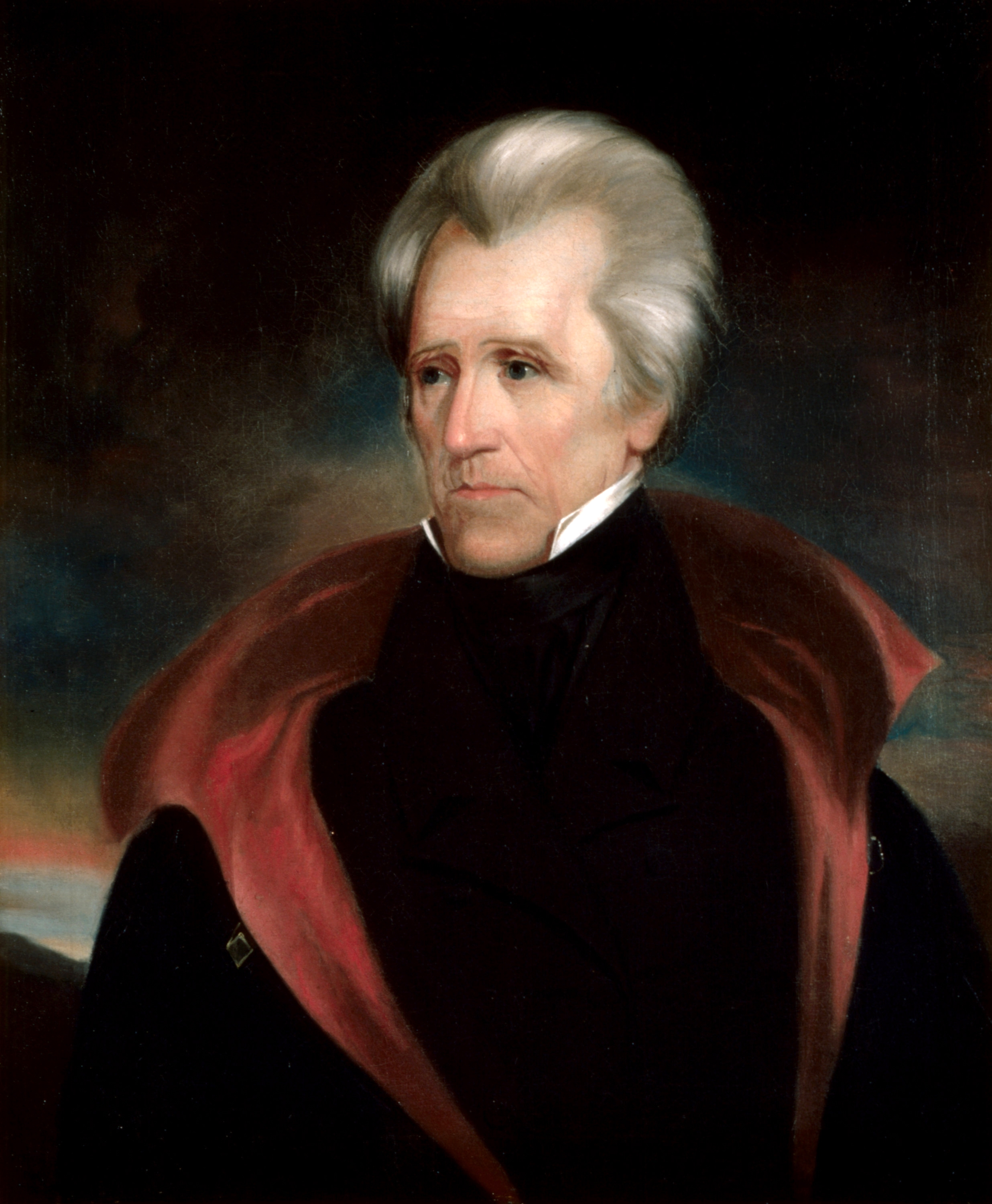
Official White House portrait of President Andrew Jackson.

The Force Bill, formally titled "An Act further to provide for the collection of duties on imports", 4 Stat. 632 (1833), refers to legislation enacted by the 22nd U.S. Congress on March 2, 1833, during the nullification crisis.

Passed by Congress at the urging of President Andrew Jackson, the Force Bill consisted of eight sections expanding presidential power and was designed to compel the state of South Carolina's compliance with a series of federal tariffs, opposed by John C. Calhoun and other leading South Carolinians. Among other things, the legislation stipulated that the president could, if he deemed it necessary, deploy the U.S. Army to force South Carolina to comply with the law.

The relevant sections of the Force Bill are:

- Section 1 deals with unlawful obstructions to the collections of import duties; by securing ports and harbors for the protection of duty collectors, allowing for the detention of vessels and cargoes to enforce revenue laws, and authorizes the president to use armed forces to protect customs officers and to prevent the unauthorized removal of untaxed vessels and cargo.
- Section 2 expands the jurisdiction of federal courts to cases arising from revenue collections by the U.S. government and allows injured parties in revenue cases to sue in court. It deems property detained by customs officers to be in the custody of the law, subject to disposition by court order only, and criminalizes anyone who circumvents the legal process in regaining detained property as guilty of a misdemeanor.
- Section 5 deals with States, or portions within a state, who employ force, or any other unlawful means, to obstruct the execution of U.S. federal law, or interfere with the process of any federal court. This section authorizes the president to use whatever force necessary to suppress such insurrections, "and to cause the said laws or process to be duly executed".
- Section 6 deals with states that refuse to jail persons imprisoned under federal law. It authorizes U.S. marshals to jail such persons in "other convenient places, within the limits of said state" and to make provisions for this purpose.
- Section 8 is a sunset clause, stating that the "first and fifth sections of this act, shall be in force until the end of the next session of Congress, and no longer."

== Background behind implementation ==
South Carolina had been sorely disappointed by negotiations surrounding the Tariffs of 1828 and 1832. The state declared the two acts unconstitutional and refused to collect federal import tariffs. President Andrew Jackson saw the nullification doctrine as being equivalent to treason.

In an early draft of what would eventually become his "Proclamation to the People of South Carolina" on December 10, 1832, Jackson declared to the South Carolina government:

Seduced as you have been, my fellow countrymen by the delusion theories and misrepresentation of ambitious, deluded & designing men, I call upon you in the language of truth, and with the feelings of a Father to retrace your steps. As you value liberty and the blessings of peace blot out from the page of your history a record so fatal to their security as this ordinance will become if it be obeyed. Rally again under the banners of the union whose obligations you in common with all your countrymen have, with an appeal to heaven, sworn to support, and which must be indissoluble as long as we are capable of enjoying freedom. Recollect that the first act of resistance to the laws which have been denounced as void by those who abuse your confidence and falsify your hopes is Treason, and subjects you to all the pains and penalties that are provided for the highest offence against your country. Can (you)...consent to become Traitors? Forbid it Heaven!

Meanwhile, Congress passed the Force Bill, which was enacted on March 2, 1833. It authorized the president to use whatever force he deemed necessary to enforce federal tariffs. As a matter of principle, the South Carolina legislature voted to nullify the Force Bill, but simultaneously, a Compromise Tariff was passed by Congress, defusing the crisis.

While the Force Bill rejected the concept of individual states' rights to nullify federal law or to secede from the Union, this was not universally accepted. It would arise again in the buildup to the American Civil War.
