= Proclamation to the People of South Carolina =

1832 statement

The Proclamation to the People of South Carolina was written by Edward Livingston and issued by Andrew Jackson on December 10, 1832. Written at the height of the nullification crisis, the proclamation directly responds to the Ordinance of Nullification passed by the South Carolina legislature in November 1832. Its purpose was to subdue the nullification crisis created by South Carolina's ordinance and to denounce the doctrine of nullification.

The proclamation outlines the actions taken by the South Carolina legislature and rejects the insistence on state sovereignty, focusing on the preservation of the Union as the primary issue. It declares nullification to be "incompatible with the existence of the Union, contradicted expressly by the letter of the Constitution, unauthorized by its spirit, inconsistent with every principle on which It was founded, and destructive of the great object for which it was formed." The proclamation also appeals to citizens to resist the violation of the constitution.

== Background ==
Jackson's Proclamation to the People of South Carolina was written in response to the growing opposition to the Tariff of 1828, which was perceived to affect heavily in the economy of the antebellum South, and the Tariff of 1832, which cut overall revenues of the previous tariff by half but was still regarded as unconstitutional by South Carolina. The South Carolina legislature declared these tariffs to be null and void with its Ordinance of Nullification. In addition to nullifying the tariffs, it also forbade the appeal of the ordinance to the Supreme Court and prohibited the federal government from collecting duties in South Carolina after February 1, 1833.

The immediate response to the Ordinance of Nullification was to substantially reduce the tariffs imposed on South Carolina and other states in the South. Jackson proposed this approach in his annual message to Congress on December 4, 1832, shortly before the creation of the Proclamation to the People of South Carolina.

== Aftermath ==
After issuing the Proclamation to the People of South Carolina, Jackson received reports in January 1833 that the legislature had not only persisted in the nullification of the Tariff of 1828 and 1832, but also rescinded all other tariff laws passed by the federal government for revenue purposes. This action continued South Carolina's efforts to assert state sovereignty, as the state refused to financially contribute to any part of the federal financial burden. Following this, Henry Clay proposed the Compromise Tariff of 1833, which was later signed into law alongside the Force Bill by Jackson on March 2, 1833. The Compromise Tariff of 1833 called for a series of reductions at two-year intervals, culminating in the same rates as the Tariff of 1816, and was supported primarily by the South and West. The Force Bill, however, authorized the president to employ military forces to uphold federal law. Although South Carolina nullified the Force Bill, it did rescind its earlier ordinance regarding nullification. The combination of the two bills allowed the federal government to assert its authority while also permitting South Carolina to accept the reduced tariffs without diminishing its own stance.

== See also ==
- Antebellum South Carolina
