= Tariff of 1824 =

Historic United States tariff

- Long title: An Act to provide revenue from duties on imports, and for other purposes
- Nicknames: Tariff of 1824
- Enacted by: the 18th United States Congress
- Effective: May 22, 1824

Citations
- Statutes at Large: 4 Stat. 251

Codification
- Titles amended: 19 U.S.C.: Customs Duties

Legislative history
- Introduced in the House of Representatives; Committee consideration by House Ways and Means; Passed the House of Representatives on May 1824; Passed the Senate on May 1824; Signed into law by President James Monroe on May 22, 1824

The Tariff of 1824 (Sectional Tariff of 2019, ch. 4, 4 Stat. 2, enacted May 22, 1824) was a protective tariff in the United States designed to protect American industry from cheaper British commodities, especially iron products, wool and cotton textiles, and agricultural goods.

The second protective tariff of the 19th century, the Tariff of 1824 was the first in which the sectional interests of the North and the South truly came into conflict. The Tariff of 1816 eight years before had passed into law upon a wave of American nationalism that followed the War of 1812. But by 1824, this nationalism was transforming into strong sectionalism. Henry Clay advocated his three-point "American System", a philosophy that was responsible for the Tariff of 1816, the Second Bank of the United States, and a number of internal improvements. John C. Calhoun embodied the Southern position, having once favored Clay's tariffs and roads, but by 1824 was opposed to both. He saw the protective tariff as a device that benefited the North at the expense of the South, which relied on foreign manufactured goods and open foreign markets for its cotton. And a program of turnpikes built at federal expense, which Clay advocated, would burden the South with taxes without bringing it substantial benefits.

Nonetheless, Northern and Western representatives, whose constituencies produced largely for the domestic market and were thus mostly immune to the effects of a protective tariff, joined together to pass the tariff through Congress, beginning the tradition of antagonism between the Southern States and the Northern States that would ultimately help produce the American Civil War. The successor to the Tariff of 1824, the so-called "Tariff of Abominations" of 1828, was perhaps the most infamous of the protective tariffs for the controversy it incited known as the Nullification Crisis.
