= Ordinance of Nullification =

1833 South Carolina state law nullifying the Tariffs of 1828 and 1832

The Ordinance of Nullification declared the Tariffs of 1828 and 1832 null and void within the borders of the U.S. state of South Carolina, beginning on February 1, 1833. It began the nullification crisis. Passed by a state convention on November 24, 1832, it led to President Andrew Jackson's proclamation against South Carolina, the Nullification Proclamation on December 10, 1832, which threatened to send government troops to enforce the tariffs. In the face of the military threat, and following a Congressional revision of the law which lowered the tariff, South Carolina repealed the ordinance.

The protest that led to the Ordinance of Nullification was caused by the belief that the tariffs of 1828 and 1832 favored the North over the South and therefore violated the Constitution. This led to an emphasis on the differences between the two regions and helped set the stage for conflict during the antebellum era, eventually leading to the American Civil War.
