= Nullification crisis =

Event during the presidency of Andrew Jackson

- 1828–1833
Era of Good Feelings	Bleeding Kansas
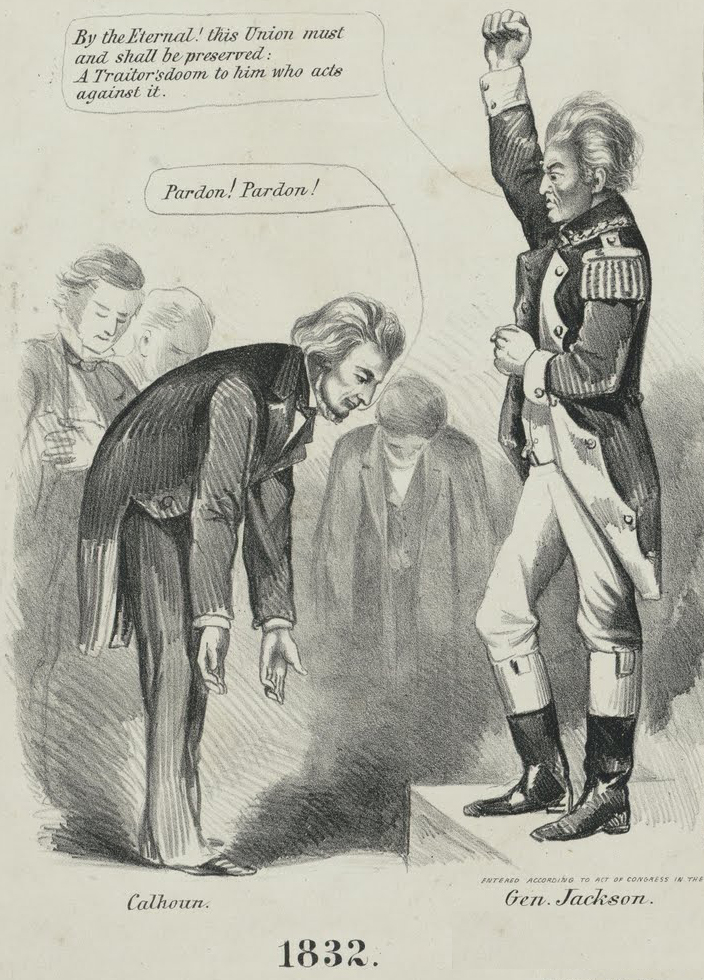
- An 1864 political cartoon recalling the crisis
- Location: United States
- Including: Presidency of John Quincy Adams; Presidency of Andrew Jackson
- Key events: Tariff of 1828; Webster–Hayne debate; Tariff of 1832; Ordinance of Nullification; Compromise Tariff of 1833

The nullification crisis was a sectional political crisis in the United States in 1832 and 1833, during the presidency of Andrew Jackson, that involved a confrontation between the state of South Carolina and the federal government. It occurred after South Carolina declared the federal Tariffs of 1828 and 1832 unconstitutional and therefore null and void within the sovereign boundaries of the state.

The controversial and highly protective Tariff of 1828 was enacted into law during the presidency of John Quincy Adams. The South strongly opposed the tariff, because it thought that it put an unfair tax burden on the Southern agrarian states that imported most manufactured goods. The tariff's opponents expected that Jackson's election as president would result in its significant reduction. When the Jackson administration failed to take action to address their concerns, South Carolina's most radical faction began to advocate that the state nullify the tariff. They subscribed to the legal theory that, if a state believed a federal law unconstitutional, it could declare the law null and void in the state. In Washington, DC, an open split on the issue occurred between Jackson and Vice President John C. Calhoun, a native South Carolinian and the most effective proponent of the constitutional theory of state nullification.

On July 1, 1832, before Calhoun resigned the vice presidency to run for the Senate, where he could more effectively defend nullification, Jackson signed into law the Tariff of 1832. This compromise tariff received the support of most Northerners and half the Southerners in Congress. South Carolina remained unsatisfied, and on November 24, 1832, a state convention adopted the Ordinance of Nullification, which declared that the Tariffs of 1828 and 1832 were unconstitutional and unenforceable in South Carolina after February 1, 1833. South Carolina initiated military preparations to resist anticipated federal enforcement, but on March 1, 1833, Congress passed both the Force Bill—authorizing the president to use military forces against South Carolina—and a new negotiated tariff, the Compromise Tariff of 1833, which was satisfactory to South Carolina. The South Carolina convention reconvened and repealed its Nullification Ordinance on March 15, 1833, but three days later, nullified the Force Bill as a symbolic gesture of principle.

The crisis was over, and both sides found reasons to claim victory. The tariff rates were reduced and stayed low to the satisfaction of the South, but the states' rights doctrine of nullification remained controversial. By the 1850s, the issues of the expansion of slavery into the western territories and the threat of the Slave Power became central issues in the nation and replaced nullification as the primary conflict over states' rights.

== Background (1787–1816) ==
The historian Richard E. Ellis wrote:

By creating a national government with the authority to act directly upon individuals, by denying to the state many of the prerogatives that they formerly had, and by leaving open to the central government the possibility of claiming for itself many powers not explicitly assigned to it, the Constitution and Bill of Rights as finally ratified substantially increased the strength of the central government at the expense of the states.

The extent of this change and the problem of the actual distribution of powers between state and the federal governments would be a matter of political and ideological discussion through the Civil War as well as afterwards. In the early 1790s the debate centered on Alexander Hamilton's nationalistic financial program versus Jefferson's democratic and agrarian program, a conflict that led to the formation of two opposing national political parties. Later in the decade the Alien and Sedition Acts led to the states' rights position being articulated in the Kentucky and Virginia Resolutions. The Kentucky Resolutions, written by Thomas Jefferson, contained the following, which has often been cited as a justification for both nullification and secession:

... that in cases of an abuse of the delegated powers, the members of the general government, being chosen by the people, a change by the people would be the constitutional remedy; but, where powers are assumed which have not been delegated, a nullification of the act is the rightful remedy: that every State has a natural right in cases not within the compact, (casus non fœderis) to nullify of their own authority all assumptions of power by others within their limits: that without this right, they would be under the dominion, absolute and unlimited, of whosoever might exercise this right of judgment for them: that nevertheless, this commonwealth, from motives of regard and respect for its co-States, has wished to communicate with them on the subject: that with them alone it is proper to communicate, they alone being parties to the compact, and solely authorized to judge in the last resort of the powers exercised under it ...

The Virginia Resolutions, written by James Madison, hold a similar argument:

The resolutions, having taken this view of the Federal compact, proceed to infer that, in cases of a deliberate, palpable, and dangerous exercise of other powers, not granted by the said compact, the States, who are parties thereto, have the right, and are in duty bound to interpose to arrest the evil, and for maintaining, within their respective limits, the authorities, rights, and liberties appertaining to them. ... The Constitution of the United States was formed by the sanction of the States, given by each in its sovereign capacity. It adds to the stability and dignity, as well as to the authority of the Constitution, that it rests on this solid foundation. The States, then, being parties to the constitutional compact, and in their sovereign capacity, it follows of necessity that there can be no tribunal above their authority to decide, in the last resort, whether the compact made by them be violated; and, consequently, as parties to it, they must themselves decide, in the last resort, such questions as may be of sufficient magnitude to require their interposition.

Historians differ over the extent to which either resolution advocated the doctrine of nullification. Historian Lance Banning wrote, "The legislators of Kentucky (or more likely, John Breckinridge, the Kentucky legislator who sponsored the resolution) deleted Jefferson's suggestion that the rightful remedy for federal usurpation was a "nullification" of such acts by each state acting on its own to prevent their operation within its respective borders. Rather than suggesting individual, although concerted, measures of this sort, Kentucky was content to ask its sisters to unite in declarations that the acts were "void and of no force", and in "requesting their appeal" at the succeeding session of the Congress." The key sentence, and the word "nullification" was used in supplementary Resolutions passed by Kentucky in 1799.

Madison's judgment is clearer. He was chairman of a committee of the Virginia Legislature, which issued a book-length Report on the Resolutions of 1798, published in 1800 after they had been decried by several states. This asserted that the state did not claim legal force. "The declarations in such cases are expressions of opinion, unaccompanied by other effect than what they may produce upon opinion, by exciting reflection. The opinions of the judiciary, on the other hand, are carried into immediate effect by force." If the states collectively agreed in their declarations, there were several methods by which it might prevail, from persuading Congress to repeal the unconstitutional law, to calling a constitutional convention, as two-thirds of the states may. When, at the time of the nullification crisis, he was presented with the Kentucky resolutions of 1799, he argued that the resolutions themselves were not Jefferson's words, and that Jefferson meant this not as a constitutional, but as a revolutionary right.

Madison biographer Ralph Ketcham wrote:

Though Madison agreed entirely with the specific condemnation of the Alien and Sedition Acts, with the concept of the limited delegated power of the general government, and even with the proposition that laws contrary to the Constitution were illegal, he drew back from the declaration that each state legislature had the power to act within its borders against the authority of the general government to oppose laws the legislature deemed unconstitutional.

Historian Sean Wilentz explains the widespread opposition to these resolutions:

Several states followed Maryland's House of Delegates in rejecting the idea that any state could, by legislative action, even claim that a federal law was unconstitutional, and suggested that any effort to do so was treasonous. A few northern states, including Massachusetts, denied the powers claimed by Kentucky and Virginia and insisted that the Sedition law was perfectly constitutional . ... Ten state legislatures with heavy Federalist majorities from around the country censured Kentucky and Virginia for usurping powers that supposedly belonged to the federal judiciary. Northern Republicans supported the resolutions' objections to the alien and sedition acts, but opposed the idea of state review of federal laws. Southern Republicans outside Virginia and Kentucky were eloquently silent about the matter, and no southern legislature heeded the call to battle.

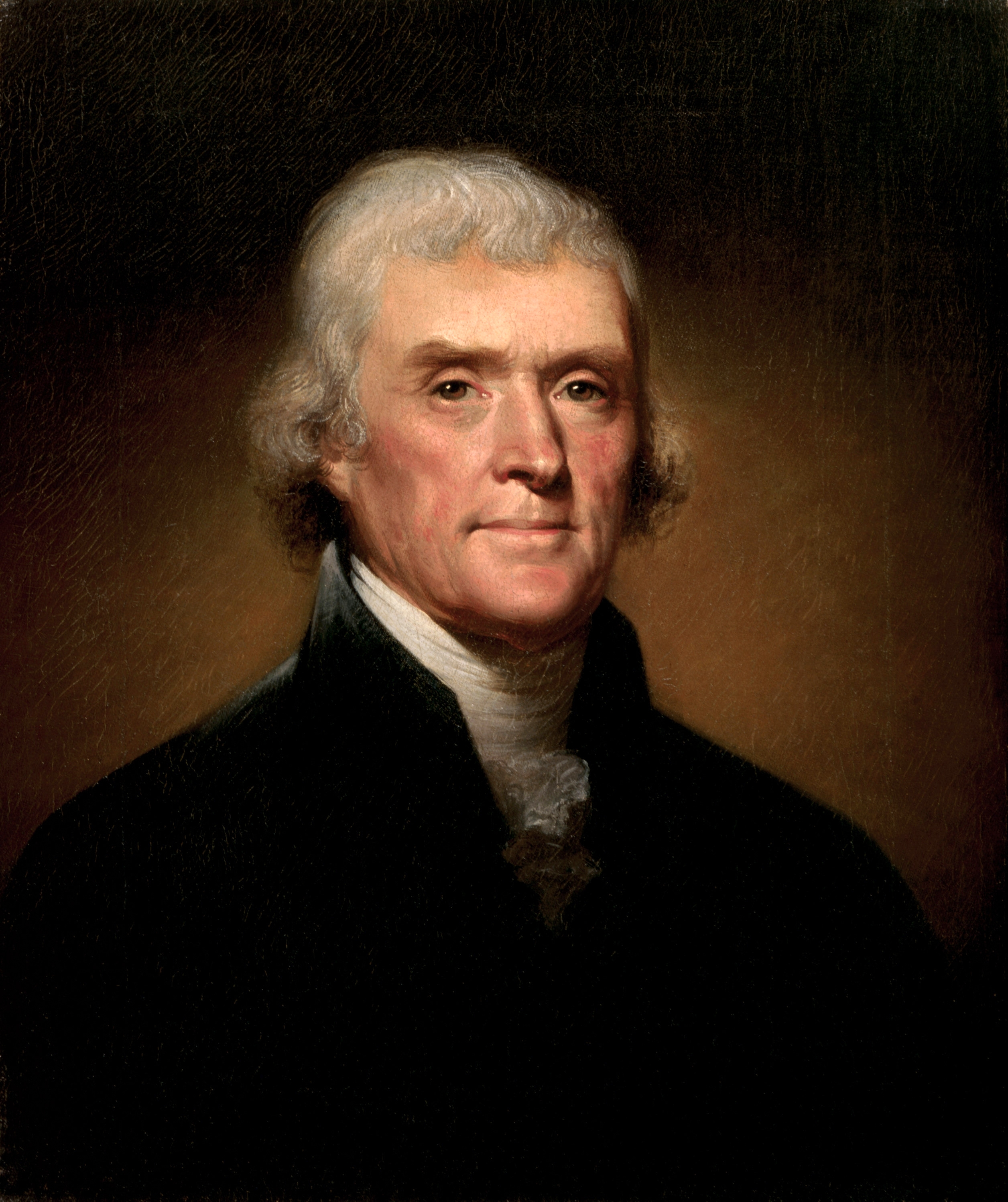
Portrait of Thomas Jefferson by Rembrandt Peale, 1800

The election of 1800 was a turning point in national politics, as the Federalists were replaced by the Democratic-Republican Party led by Jefferson, but the four presidential terms spanning the period from 1800 to 1817 "did little to advance the cause of states' rights and much to weaken it." Over Jefferson's opposition, the power of the federal judiciary, led by Federalist Chief Justice John Marshall, increased. Jefferson expanded federal powers with the acquisition of the Louisiana Territory and his use of a national embargo designed to prevent involvement in a European war. Madison in 1809 used national troops to enforce a Supreme Court decision in Pennsylvania, appointed an "extreme nationalist" in Joseph Story to the Supreme Court, signed the bill creating the Second Bank of the United States, and called for a constitutional amendment to promote internal improvements.

Opposition to the War of 1812 was centered in New England. Delegates to a convention in Hartford, Connecticut, met in December 1814 to consider a New England response to Madison's war policy. The debate allowed many radicals to argue the cause of states' rights and state sovereignty. In the end, moderate voices dominated and the final product was not secession or nullification, but a series of proposed constitutional amendments. Identifying the South's domination of the government as the cause of much of their problems, the proposed amendments included "the repeal of the three-fifths clause, a requirement that two-thirds of both houses of Congress agree before any new state could be admitted to the Union, limits on the length of embargoes, and the outlawing of the election of a president from the same state to successive terms, clearly aimed at the Virginians." The war was over before the proposals were submitted to President Madison.

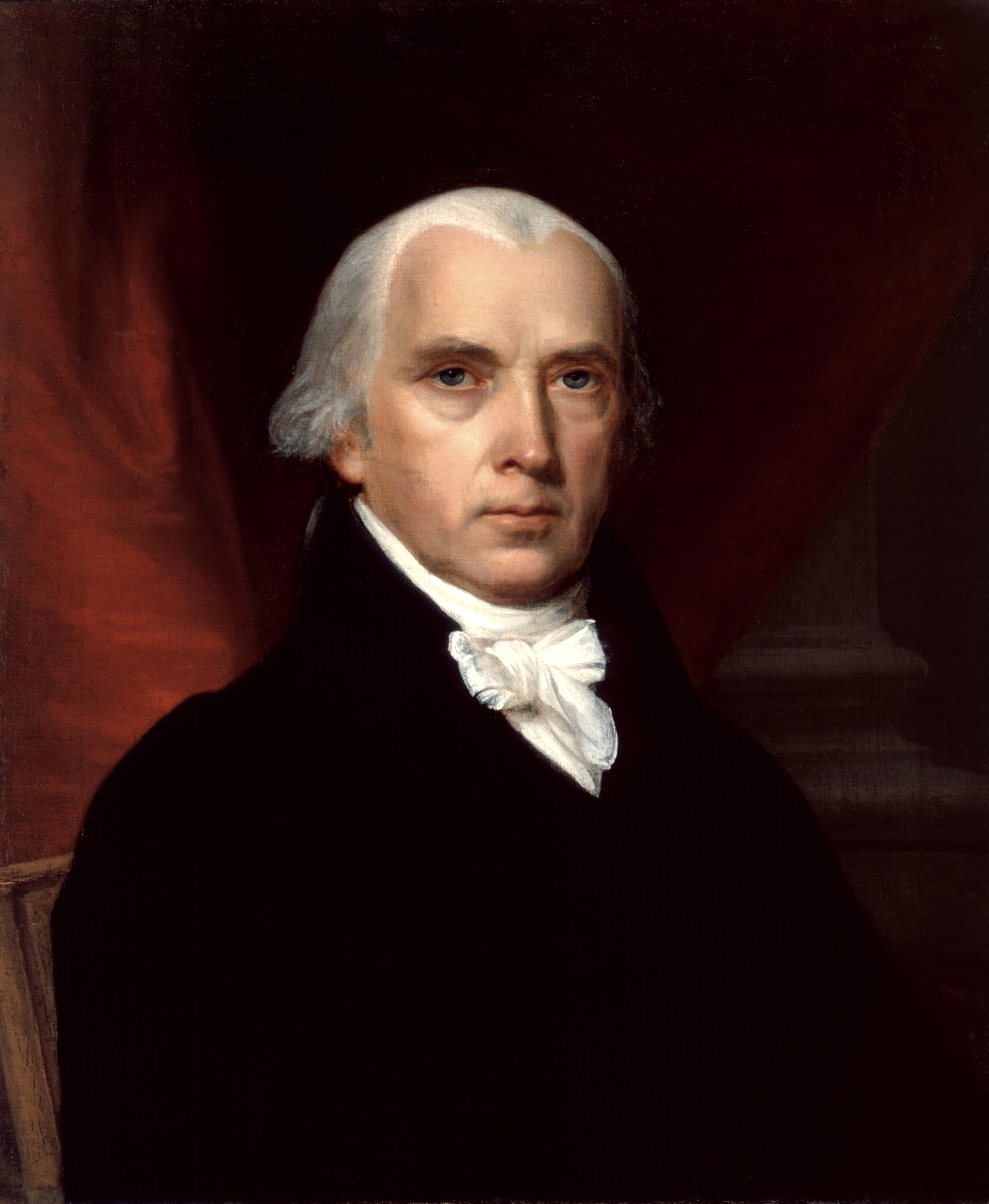
Portrait of James Madison by John Vanderlyn, c. 1816

After the conclusion of the War of 1812 Sean Wilentz notes:

Madison's speech [his 1815 annual message to Congress] affirmed that the war had reinforced the evolution of mainstream Republicanism, moving it further away from its original and localist assumptions. The war's immense strain on the treasury led to new calls from nationalist Republicans for a national bank. The difficulties in moving and supplying troops exposed the wretchedness of the country's transportation links, and the need for extensive new roads and canals. A boom in American manufacturing during the prolonged cessation of trade with Britain created an entirely new class of enterprisers, most of them tied politically to the Republicans, who might not survive without tariff protection. More broadly, the war reinforced feelings of national identity and connection.

This spirit of nationalism was linked to the tremendous growth and economic prosperity of this postwar era. However in 1819, the nation suffered its first financial panic and the 1820s turned out to be a decade of political turmoil that again led to fierce debates over competing views of the exact nature of American federalism. The "extreme democratic and agrarian rhetoric" that had been so effective in 1798 led to renewed attacks on the "numerous market-oriented enterprises, particularly banks, corporations, creditors, and absentee landholders".

== Tariffs (1816–1828) ==
The Tariff of 1816 had some protective features, and it received support throughout the nation, including that of John C. Calhoun and fellow South Carolinian William Lowndes. The first explicitly protective tariff linked to a specific program of internal improvements was the Tariff of 1824. Sponsored by Henry Clay, this tariff provided a general level of protection at 35% ad valorem (compared to 25% with the 1816 act) and hiked duties on iron, woolens, cotton, hemp, and wool and cotton bagging. The bill barely passed the federal House of Representatives by a vote of 107 to 102. The Middle states and Northwest supported the bill, the South and Southwest opposed it, and New England split its vote with a majority opposing it. In the Senate, the bill, with the support of Tennessee Senator Andrew Jackson, passed by four votes, and President James Monroe, the Virginia heir to the Jefferson-Madison control of the White House, signed the bill on March 25, 1824. Daniel Webster of Massachusetts led the New England opposition to this tariff.

Protest against the prospect and the constitutionality of higher tariffs began in 1826 and 1827 with William Branch Giles, who had the Virginia legislature pass resolutions denying the power of Congress to pass protective tariffs, citing the Virginia Resolutions of 1798 and James Madison's 1800 defense of them. Madison denied both the appeal to nullification and the unconstitutionality; he had always held that the power to regulate commerce included protection. Jefferson had, at the end of his life, written against protective tariffs.

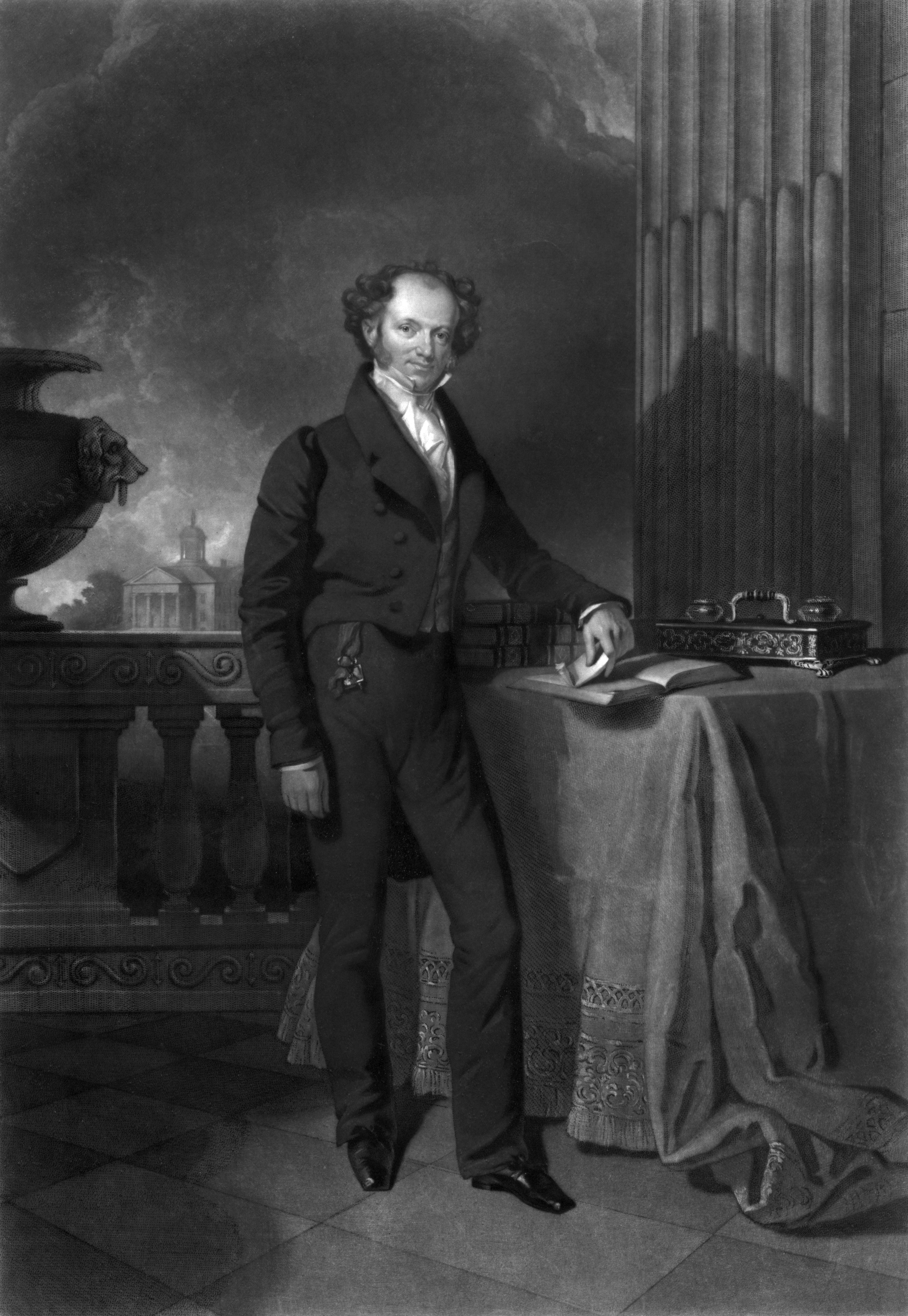
Portrait of Martin Van Buren

The Tariff of 1828 was largely the work of Martin Van Buren (although Silas Wright Jr. of New York prepared the main provisions) and was partly a political ploy to elect Andrew Jackson President. Van Buren calculated that the South would vote for Jackson regardless of the issues, so he ignored their interests in drafting the bill. New England, he thought, was just as likely to support the incumbent John Quincy Adams, so the bill levied heavy taxes on raw materials consumed by New England such as hemp, flax, molasses, iron, and sail duck. With an additional tariff on iron to satisfy Pennsylvania interests, Van Buren expected the tariff to help deliver Pennsylvania, New York, Missouri, Ohio, and Kentucky to Jackson. Over opposition from the South and some from New England, the tariff was passed with the full support of many Jackson supporters in Congress and signed by President Adams in early 1828.

As expected, Jackson and his running mate John Calhoun carried the entire South with overwhelming numbers in every state but Louisiana, where Adams drew 47% of the vote in a losing effort. But many Southerners became dissatisfied as Jackson, in his first two annual messages to Congress, failed to launch a strong attack on the tariff. Historian William J. Cooper Jr. writes:

The most doctrinaire ideologues of the Old Republican group [supporters of the Jefferson and Madison position in the late 1790s] first found Jackson wanting. These purists identified the tariff of 1828, the hated Tariff of Abominations, as the most heinous manifestation of the nationalist policy they abhorred. That protective tariff violated their constitutional theory, for, as they interpreted the document, it gave no permission for a protective tariff. Moreover, they saw protection as benefiting the North and hurting the South.

== South Carolina background (1819–1828) ==
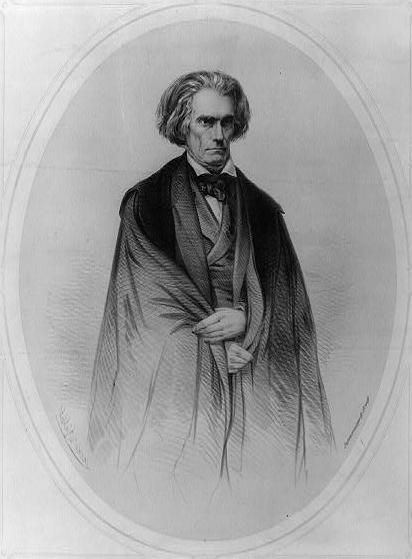
John C. Calhoun

South Carolina had been adversely affected by the national economic decline of the 1820s. During this decade, the population decreased by 56,000 whites and 30,000 slaves, out of a total free and enslaved population of 580,000. The whites left for better places; they took slaves with them or sold them to traders moving slaves to the Deep South for sale.

Historian Richard E. Ellis describes the situation:

Throughout the colonial and early national periods, South Carolina had sustained substantial economic growth and prosperity. This had created an extremely wealthy and extravagant low country aristocracy whose fortunes were based first on the cultivation of rice and indigo, and then on cotton. Then the state was devastated by the Panic of 1819. The depression that followed was more severe than in almost any other state of the Union. Moreover, competition from the newer cotton producing areas along the Gulf Coast, blessed with fertile lands that produced a higher crop-yield per acre, made recovery painfully slow. To make matters worse, in large areas of South Carolina slaves vastly outnumbered whites, and there existed both considerable fear of slave rebellion and a growing sensitivity to even the smallest criticism of "the peculiar institution."

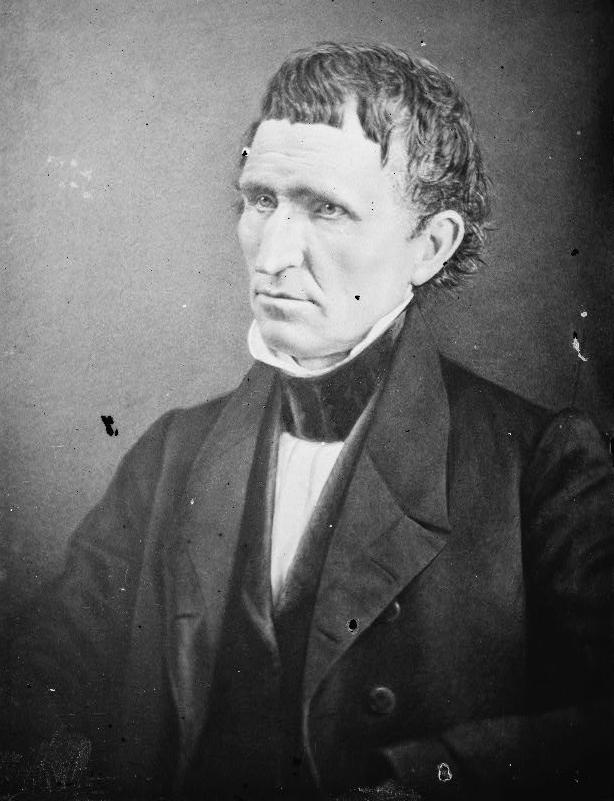
George McDuffie

State leaders, led by states' rights advocates such as William Smith and Thomas Cooper, blamed most of the state's economic problems on the Tariff of 1816 and national internal improvement projects. Soil erosion and competition from the New Southwest were also very significant reasons for the state's declining fortunes. George McDuffie was a particularly effective speaker for the anti-tariff forces, and he popularized the Forty Bale theory. McDuffie argued that the 40% tariff on cotton finished goods meant that "the manufacturer actually invades your barns, and plunders you of 40 out of every 100 bales that you produce." Mathematically incorrect, this argument still struck a nerve with his constituency. Nationalists such as Calhoun were forced by the increasing power of such leaders to retreat from their previous positions and adopt, in the words of Ellis, "an even more extreme version of the states' rights doctrine" in order to maintain political significance within South Carolina.

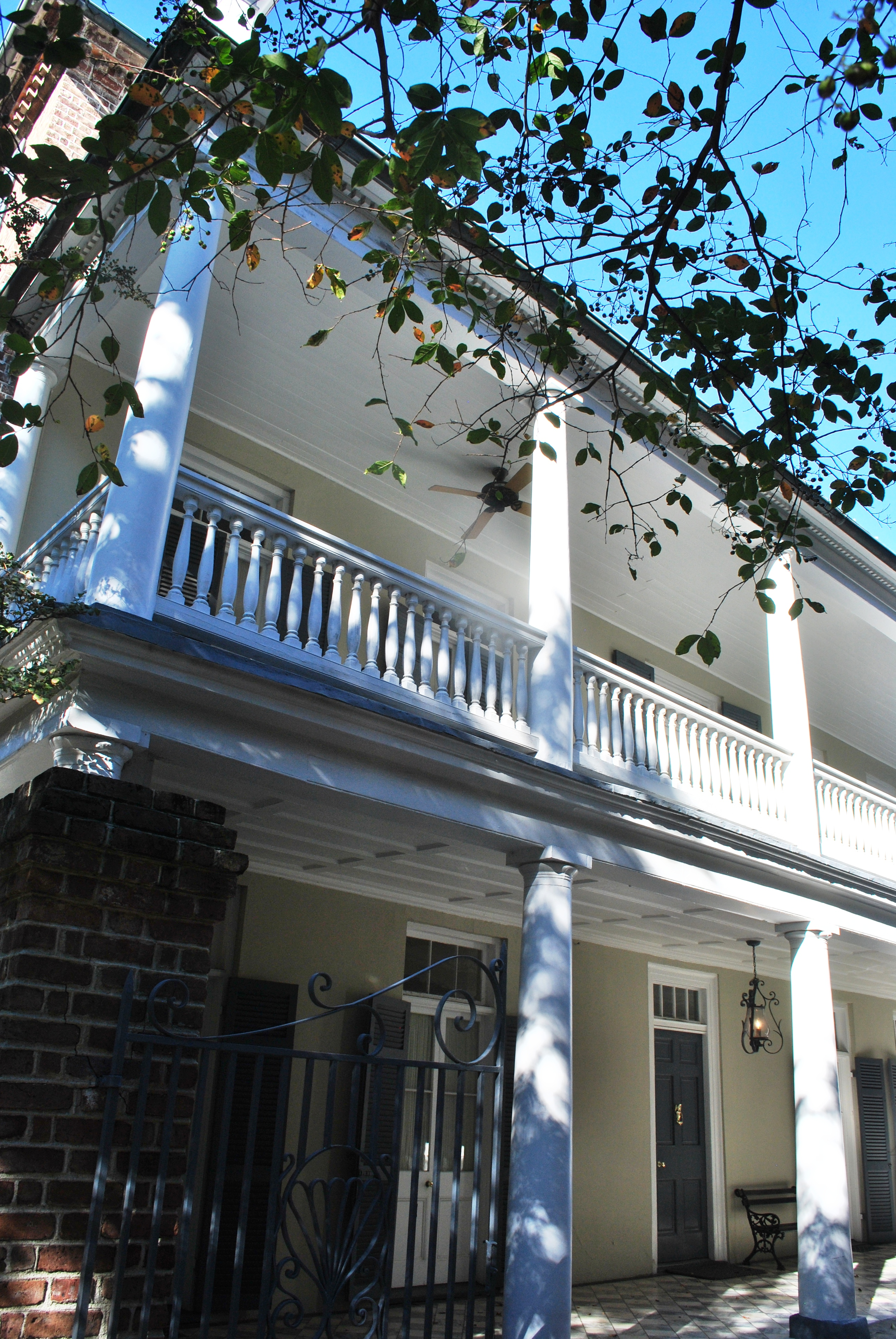
Thomas Bee's House, Charleston, circa 1730: The Nullification Movement that split the nation started here in 1832. John C. Calhoun, S.C. Governor Robert Hayne, General James Hamilton and other leaders drafted the Nullification Papers in the second-floor drawing room.

South Carolina's first effort at nullification occurred in 1822. Its planter class believed that free Black sailors had assisted Denmark Vesey in his planned slave rebellion. South Carolina passed the Negro Seaman Act, which required all foreign Black seamen to be imprisoned while their ships were docked in Charleston. If the captains did not pay the fees to cover the cost of jailing, South Carolina would sell the sailors into slavery. Other Southern states also passed laws against free Black sailors.

In August 1823, Charleston sheriff Francis G. Deliesseline boarded the British merchantman Homer and arrested Henry Elkison, a Jamaican sailor, under the Negro Seaman Act. Elkison, who was incarcerated in a Charleston jail for a period of time, sued South Carolina in the Supreme Court, arguing the act violated prior Anglo-American treaties. Supreme Court Justice William Johnson, in his capacity as a circuit judge, declared the South Carolina law as unconstitutional since it violated the United States' treaties with the United Kingdom. The South Carolina Senate announced that the judge's ruling was invalid and that the act would be enforced. The federal government did not attempt to carry out Johnson's decision.

== Route to nullification in South Carolina (1828–1832) ==
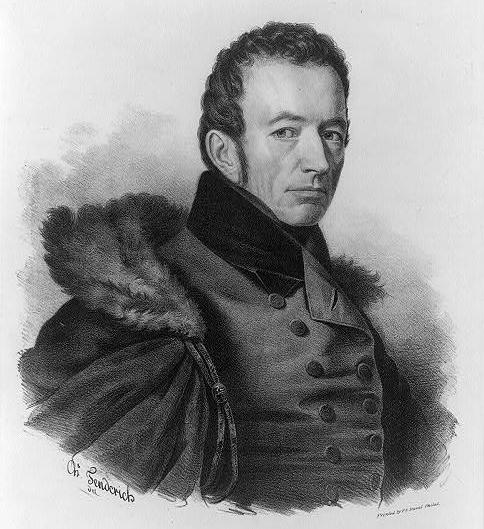
Joel Roberts Poinsett, South Carolina Unionist leader

Historian Avery Craven argues that, for the most part, the debate from 1828 to 1832 was a local South Carolina affair. The state's leaders were not united and the sides were roughly equal. The western part of the state and a faction in Charleston, led by Joel Poinsett and Thomas Smith Grimké, remained loyal to the Union. Only in small part was the conflict between "a National North against a States'-right South".

After the final vote on the Tariff of 1828, South Carolina's congressional delegation held two caucuses, the second at the home of Senator Robert Y. Hayne. They were rebuffed in their efforts to coordinate a united Southern response and focused on how their state representatives would react. While many agreed with McDuffie that tariff policy could lead to secession, they all agreed that, as much as possible, the issue should be kept out of the upcoming presidential election. Calhoun, while not at this meeting, served as a moderating influence. He felt that the first step in reducing the tariff was to defeat Adams and his supporters in the upcoming election. William C. Preston, on behalf of the South Carolina legislature, asked Calhoun to prepare a report on the tariff situation. Calhoun readily accepted and in a few weeks had a 35,000-word draft of what would become his "Exposition and Protest".

Calhoun's "Exposition" was completed in late 1828. He argued that the tariff of 1828 was unconstitutional because it favored manufacturing over commerce and agriculture. He believed the tariff power could be used only to generate revenue, not to provide protection from foreign competition for American industries, and that the people of a state or several states, acting in a democratically elected convention, had the power to veto any act of the federal government that violated the Constitution. This veto power, the core of the doctrine of nullification, was explained by Calhoun in the Exposition:

If it be conceded, as it must be by every one who is the least conversant with our institutions, that the sovereign powers delegated are divided between the General and State Governments, and that the latter hold their portion by the same tenure as the former, it would seem impossible to deny to the States the right of deciding on the infractions of their powers, and the proper remedy to be applied for their correction. The right of judging, in such cases, is an essential attribute of sovereignty, of which the States cannot be divested without losing their sovereignty itself, and being reduced to a subordinate corporate condition. In fact, to divide power, and to give to one of the parties the exclusive right of judging of the portion allotted to each, is, in reality, not to divide it at all; and to reserve such exclusive right to the General Government (it matters not by what department to be exercised), is to convert it, in fact, into a great consolidated government, with unlimited powers, and to divest the States, in reality, of all their rights, It is impossible to understand the force of terms, and to deny so plain a conclusion.

The report also detailed the specific southern grievances over the tariff that led to the current dissatisfaction. Fearful that "hotheads" such as McDuffie might force the legislature into taking drastic action against the federal government, historian John Niven describes Calhoun's political purpose in the document:

All through that hot and humid summer, emotions among the vociferous planter population had been worked up to a near-frenzy of excitement. The whole tenor of the argument built up in the "Exposition" was aimed to present the case in a cool, considered manner that would dampen any drastic moves yet would set in motion the machinery for repeal of the tariff act. It would also warn other sections of the Union against any future legislation that an increasingly self-conscious South might consider punitive, especially on the subject of slavery.

The report was submitted to the state legislature, which had 5,000 copies printed and distributed. Calhoun, who still had designs on succeeding Jackson as president, was not identified as the author, but word on this soon leaked out. The legislature took no action on the report at that time.

In the summer of 1828, Robert Barnwell Rhett, soon to be considered the most radical of the South Carolinians, entered the fray over the tariff. As a state representative, Rhett called for the governor to convene a special session of the legislature. An outstanding orator, Rhett appealed to his constituents to resist the majority in Congress. He addressed the danger of doing nothing:

But if you are doubtful of yourselves—if you are not prepared to follow up your principles wherever they may lead, to their very last consequence—if you love life better than honor,—prefer ease to perilous liberty and glory; awake not! Stir not!—Impotent resistance will add vengeance to your ruin. Live in smiling peace with your insatiable Oppressors, and die with the noble consolation that your submissive patience will survive triumphant your beggary and despair.

Rhett's rhetoric about revolution and war was too radical in the summer of 1828 but, with the election of Jackson assured, James Hamilton Jr. on October 28 in the Colleton County Courthouse in Walterborough "launched the formal nullification campaign." Renouncing his former nationalism, Hamilton warned the people that "Your task-master must soon become a tyrant, from the very abuses and corruption of the system, without the bowels of compassion, or a jot of human sympathy." He called for implementation of Jefferson's "rightful remedy" of nullification. Hamilton sent a copy of the speech directly to President-elect Jackson. But despite a statewide campaign by Hamilton and McDuffie, a proposal to call a nullification convention in 1829 was defeated by the South Carolina legislature meeting at the end of 1828. State leaders such as Calhoun, Hayne, Smith, and William Drayton all remained publicly noncommittal or opposed to nullification for the next couple of years.

The division in the state between radicals and conservatives continued through 1829 and 1830. After the failure of a state project to arrange financing of a railroad within the state to promote internal trade, the state petitioned Congress to invest $250,000 in the company trying to build it. After Congress tabled the measure, debate in South Carolina resumed between those who wanted state investment and those who wanted to work to get Congress's support. The debate demonstrated that a significant minority of the state did have an interest in Clay's American System. The effect of the Webster–Hayne debate was to energize the radicals, and some moderates started to move in their direction.

The state election campaign of 1830 focused on the tariff issue and the need for a state convention. On the defensive, radicals underplayed the intent of the convention as pro-nullification. When voters were presented with races where an unpledged convention was the issue, the radicals generally won. When conservatives effectively characterized the race as being about nullification, the radicals lost. The October election was narrowly carried by the radicals, although the blurring of the issues left them without any specific mandate. In South Carolina, the governor was selected by the legislature, which chose James Hamilton, the leader of the radical movement, and fellow radical Henry L. Pinckney as speaker of the South Carolina House. For the open Senate seat, the legislature chose the more radical Stephen Decatur Miller over William Smith.

With radicals in leading positions, in 1831 they began to capture momentum. State politics became sharply divided along Nullifier and Unionist lines. Still, the margin in the legislature fell short of the two-thirds majority needed for a convention. Many of the radicals felt that convincing Calhoun of the futility of his plans for the presidency would lead him into their ranks. Calhoun, meanwhile, had concluded that Van Buren was establishing himself as Jackson's heir apparent. At Hamilton's prompting, McDuffie made a three-hour speech in Charleston demanding nullification of the tariff at any cost. In the state, the success of McDuffie's speech seemed to open up the possibilities of both military confrontation with the federal government and civil war within the state. With silence no longer an acceptable alternative, Calhoun looked for the opportunity to take control of the antitariff faction in the state; by June he was preparing what would be known as his Fort Hill Address.

Published on July 26, 1831, the address repeated and expanded the positions Calhoun had made in the "Exposition". While the logic of much of the speech was consistent with the states' rights position of most Jacksonians, and even Daniel Webster remarked that it "was the ablest and most plausible, and therefore the most dangerous vindication of that particular form of Revolution", the speech still placed Calhoun clearly in a nullified camp. Within South Carolina, his gestures at moderation in the speech were drowned out as planters received word of the Nat Turner insurrection in Virginia. Calhoun was not alone in finding a connection between the abolition movement and the sectional aspects of the tariff issue. It confirmed for Calhoun what he had written in a September 11, 1830, letter:

I consider the tariff act as the occasion, rather than the real cause of the present unhappy state of things. The truth can no longer be disguised, that the peculiar institution of the Southern States and the consequent direction which that and her soil have given to her industry, has placed them in regard to taxation and appropriations in opposite relation to the majority of the Union, against the danger of which, if there be no protective power in the reserved rights of the states they must in the end be forced to rebel, or, submit to have their paramount interests sacrificed, their domestic institutions subordinated by Colonization and other schemes, and themselves and children reduced to wretchedness.

From this point, the nullifiers accelerated their organization and rhetoric. In July 1831, the States Rights and Free Trade Association was formed in Charleston and expanded throughout the state. Unlike state political organizations in the past, which were led by the South Carolina planter aristocracy, this group appealed to all segments of the population, including non-slaveholder farmers, small slaveholders, and the Charleston non-agricultural class. Governor Hamilton was instrumental in seeing that the association, which was both a political and a social organization, expanded throughout the state. In the winter of 1831 and spring of 1832, Hamilton held conventions and rallies throughout the state to mobilize the nullification movement. The conservatives were unable to match the radicals in organization or leadership.

The state elections of 1832 were "charged with tension and bespattered with violence," and "polite debates often degenerated into frontier brawls." Unlike the previous year's election, the choice was clear between nullifiers and unionists. The nullifiers won and on October 20, 1832, Hamilton called the legislature into a special session to consider a convention. The legislative vote was 96–25 in the House and 31–13 in the Senate.

In November 1832, the Nullification Convention met. The convention declared the tariffs of 1828 and 1832 unconstitutional and unenforceable within the state of South Carolina after February 1, 1833. It was asserted that attempts to use force to collect the taxes would lead to the state's secession. Robert Hayne, who succeeded Hamilton as governor in 1833, established a 2,000-man group of mounted minutemen and 25,000 infantry who would march to Charleston in the event of a military conflict. These troops were to be armed with $100,000 in arms purchased in the North.

The enabling legislation passed by the legislature was carefully constructed to avoid clashes if at all possible and create an aura of legality in the process. To avoid conflicts with Unionists, it allowed importers to pay the tariff if they desired. Other merchants could pay the tariff by obtaining a paper tariff bond from the customs officer. They would then refuse to pay the bond when due, and if the customs official seized the goods, the merchant would file for a writ of replevin to recover the goods in state court. Customs officials who refused to return the goods (by placing them under the protection of federal troops) would be civilly liable for twice the value of the goods. To ensure that state officials and judges supported the law, a "test oath" would be required for all new state officials, binding them to support the ordinance of nullification.

Governor Hayne in his inaugural address announced South Carolina's position:

If the sacred soil of Carolina should be polluted by the footsteps of an invader, or be stained with the blood of her citizens, shed in defense, I trust in Almighty God that no son of hers ... who has been nourished at her bosom ... will be found raising a parricidal arm against our common mother. And even should she stand ALONE in this great struggle for constitutional liberty ... that there will not be found, in the wider limits of the state, one recreant son who will not fly to the rescue, and be ready to lay down his life in her defense.

== Washington, D.C. (1828–1832) ==
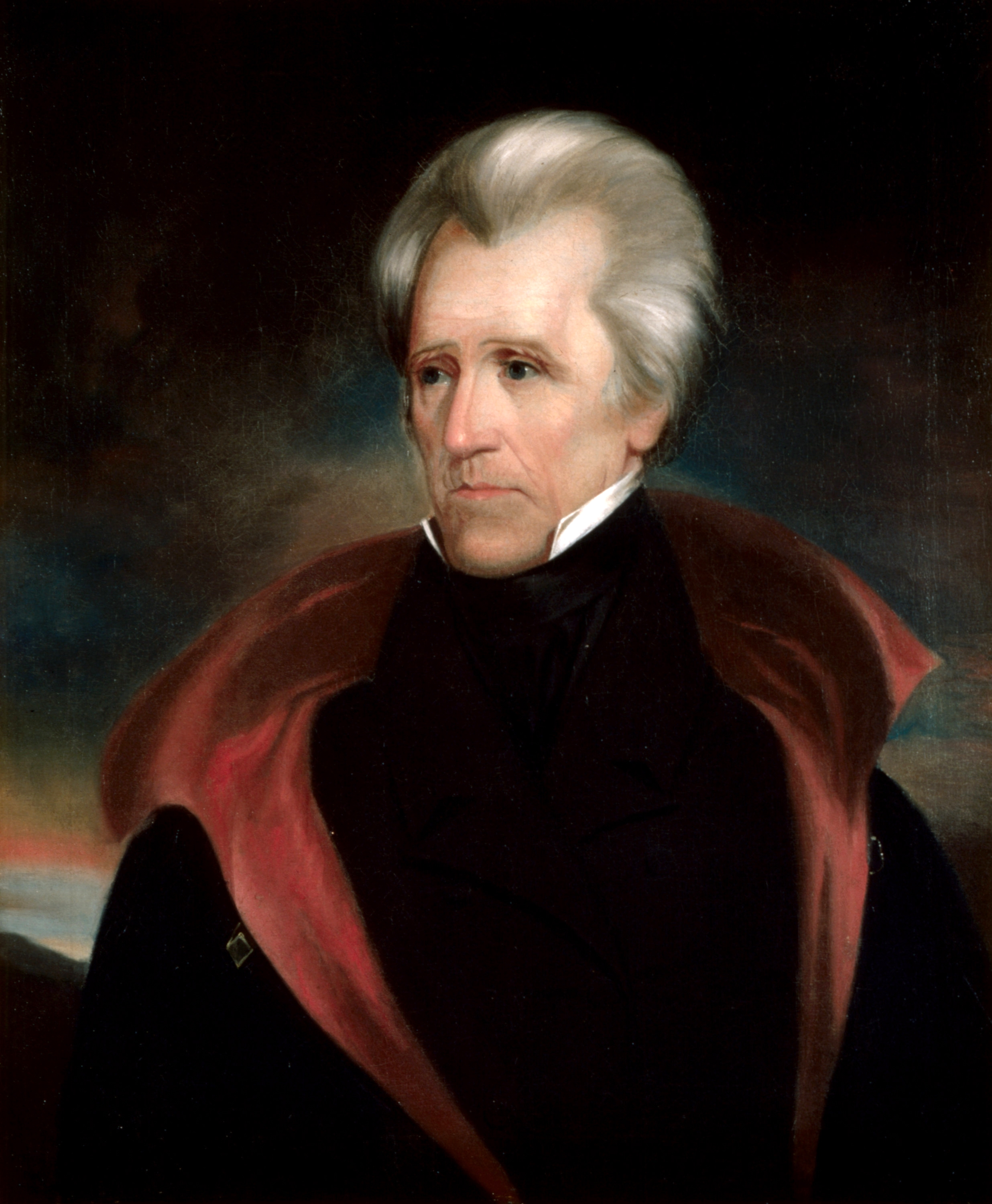
Official White House portrait of Andrew Jackson

When President Jackson took office in March 1829, he was well aware of the turmoil created by the "Tariff of Abominations". While he may have abandoned some of his earlier beliefs that had allowed him to vote for the Tariff of 1824, he still felt protectionism was justified for products essential to military preparedness and did not believe that the current tariff should be reduced until the national debt was fully paid off. He addressed the issue in his inaugural address and his first three messages to Congress, but offered no specific relief. In December 1831, with the proponents of nullification in South Carolina gaining momentum, Jackson recommended "the exercise of that spirit of concession and conciliation which has distinguished the friends of our Union in all great emergencies." But on the constitutional issue of nullification, despite his strong beliefs in states' rights, Jackson did not waver.

Calhoun's "Exposition and Protest" started a national debate on the doctrine of nullification. The leading proponents of the nationalistic view included Daniel Webster, Supreme Court Justice Joseph Story, Judge William Alexander Duer, John Quincy Adams, Nathaniel Chipman, and Nathan Dane. They rejected the compact theory advanced by Calhoun, claiming that the Constitution was the product of the people, not the states. According to the nationalist position, the Supreme Court had the final say on legislation's constitutionality, and the national union was perpetual and had supreme authority over individual states. The nullifiers, on the other hand, asserted that the central government was not the ultimate arbiter of its own power, and that the states, as the contracting entities, could judge for themselves what was constitutional. While Calhoun's "Exposition" claimed that nullification was based on the reasoning behind the Kentucky and Virginia Resolutions, an aging James Madison in an August 28, 1830, letter to Edward Everett, intended for publication, disagreed. Madison wrote, denying that any individual state could alter the compact:

Can more be necessary to demonstrate the inadmissibility of such a doctrine than that it puts it in the power of the smallest fraction over 1/4 of the U. S.—that is, of 7 States out of 24—to give the law and even the Constn. to 17 States, each of the 17 having as parties to the Constn. an equal right with each of the 7 to expound it & to insist on the exposition. That the 7 might, in particular instances be right and the 17 wrong, is more than possible. But to establish a positive & permanent rule giving such a power to such a minority over such a majority, would overturn the first principle of free Govt. and in practice necessarily overturn the Govt. itself.

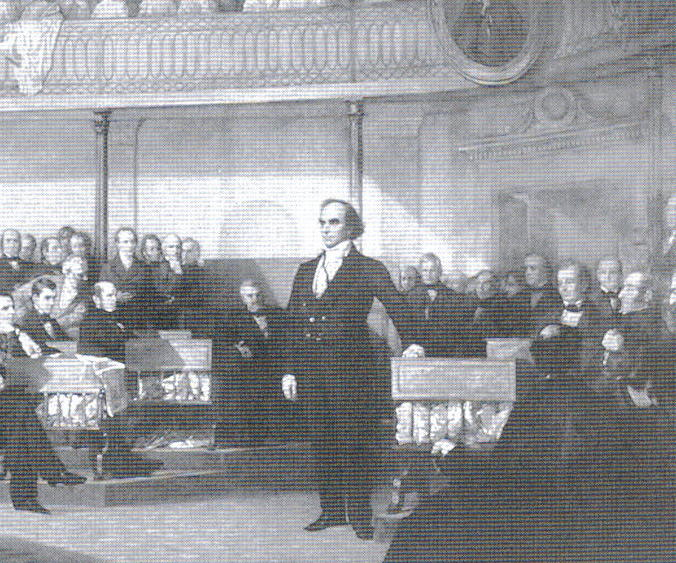
Webster Replying to Hayne by George P.A. Healy

Part of the South's strategy to force repeal of the tariff was to arrange an alliance with the West. Under the plan, the South would support the West's demand for free lands in the public domain if the West supported repeal of the tariff. With this purpose, Robert Hayne took the floor on the Senate in early 1830, beginning "the most celebrated debate in the Senate's history." Daniel Webster's response shifted the debate, subsequently styled the Webster-Hayne debates, from the specific issue of western lands to a general debate on the very nature of the United States. Webster's position differed from Madison's: Webster asserted that the people of the United States acted as one aggregate body, while Madison held that the people of the several states acted collectively. John Rowan spoke against Webster on that issue, and Madison wrote, congratulating Webster, but explaining his own position. The debate presented the fullest articulation of the differences over nullification, and 40,000 copies of Webster's response, which concluded with "liberty and Union, now and forever, one and inseparable", were distributed nationwide.

Many people expected Jackson to side with Hayne, but once the debate shifted to secession and nullification, he sided with Webster. On April 13, 1830, at the traditional Democratic Party celebration honoring Jefferson's birthday, Jackson chose to make his position clear. In a battle of toasts, Hayne proposed, "The Union of the States, and the Sovereignty of the States." Jackson's response, when his turn came, was, "Our Federal Union: It must be preserved." To those attending, the effect was dramatic. Calhoun responded with his own toast, in a play on Webster's closing remarks in the earlier debate, "The Union. Next to our liberty, the most dear." Finally, Van Buren offered, "Mutual forbearance and reciprocal concession. Through their agency the Union was established. The patriotic spirit from which they emanated will forever sustain it."

Van Buren wrote in his autobiography of Jackson's toast, "The veil was rent—the incantations of the night were exposed to the light of day." Senator Thomas Hart Benton, in his memoirs, wrote that the toast "electrified the country." Jackson had the final word a few days later, when a visitor from South Carolina asked if Jackson had any message he wanted relayed to his friends back in the state. Jackson's reply was:

Yes I have; please give my compliments to my friends in your State and say to them, that if a single drop of blood shall be shed there in opposition to the laws of the United States, I will hang the first man I can lay my hand on engaged in such treasonable conduct, upon the first tree I can reach.

Other issues than the tariff were still being decided. In May 1830, Jackson vetoed the Maysville Road Bill, an important internal-improvements program (especially to Kentucky and Henry Clay), and then followed this with additional vetoes of other such projects shortly before Congress adjourned at the end of May. Clay used these vetoes to launch his presidential campaign. In 1831, the rechartering of the Bank of the United States, with Clay and Jackson on opposite sides, reopened a long-simmering problem. This issue was featured at the December 1831 National Republican convention in Baltimore, which nominated Clay for president, and the proposal to recharter was formally introduced into Congress on January 6, 1832. The Calhoun-Jackson split entered the center stage when Calhoun, as vice president presiding over the Senate, cast the tie-breaking vote to deny Van Buren the post of minister to England. Van Buren was subsequently selected as Jackson's running mate at the 1832 Democratic National Convention held in May.

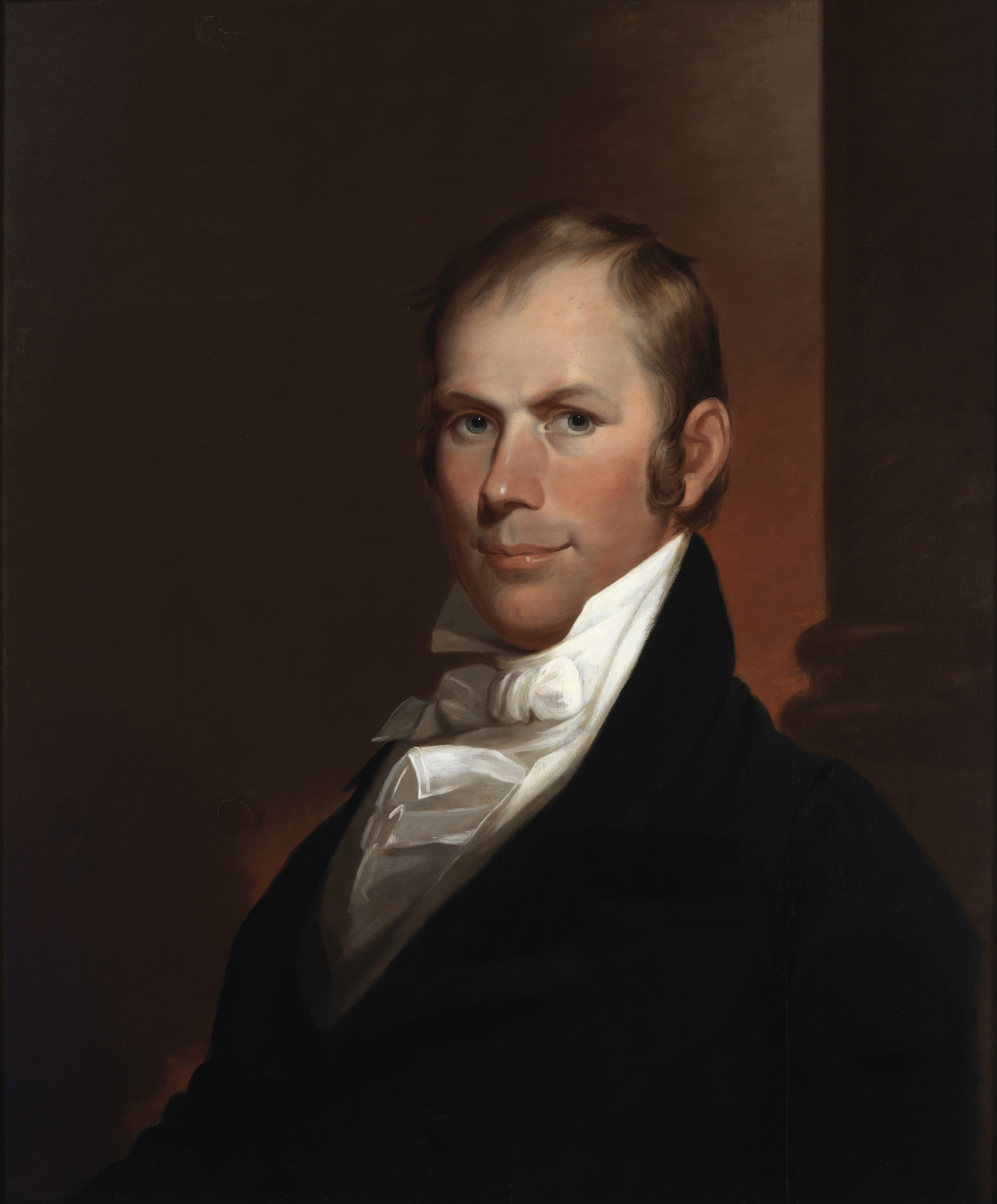
Portrait of Henry Clay

In February 1832, Clay, back in the Senate after a two-decade absence, made a three-day speech calling for a new tariff schedule and an expansion of his American System. In an effort to reach out to Calhoun and other Southerners, Clay's proposal provided for a $10 million revenue reduction based on the budget surplus he anticipated for the coming year. Significant protection was still part of the plan, as the reduction primarily came on imports not in competition with domestic producers. Jackson proposed an alternative that reduced overall tariffs to 28%. John Quincy Adams, now in the House of Representatives, used his Committee of Manufacturers to produce a compromise bill that, in its final form, reduced revenues by $5 million, lowered duties on noncompetitive products, and retained high tariffs on woolens, iron, and cotton products. During the political maneuvering, McDuffie's Ways and Means Committee, the normal originator of such bills, prepared a bill with drastic reduction across the board, but it went nowhere. Jackson signed the Tariff of 1832 on July 14, 1832, a few days after vetoing the Bank of the United States recharter bill. Congress adjourned after failing to override Jackson's veto.

With Congress adjourned, Jackson anxiously watched events in South Carolina. The nullifiers found no significant compromise in the Tariff of 1832 and acted accordingly. Jackson heard rumors of efforts to subvert members of the army and navy in Charleston and ordered the secretaries of the army and navy to begin rotating troops and officers based on their loyalty. He ordered General Winfield Scott to prepare for military operations and ordered a naval squadron in Norfolk to prepare to go to Charleston. Jackson kept lines of communication open with unionists such as Joel Poinsett, William Drayton, and James L. Petigru and sent George Breathitt, brother of the Kentucky governor, to independently obtain political and military intelligence. After their defeat at the polls in October, Petigru advised Jackson to "Be prepared to hear very shortly of a State Convention and an act of Nullification."

On October 29, 1832, Jackson wrote to his Secretary of War, Lewis Cass:

The attempt will be made to surprise the Forts & garrisons by the militia, and must be guarded against with vestal vigilance and any attempt by force repelled with prompt and exemplary punishment.

By mid-November, Jackson's reelection was assured. On December 3, 1832, Jackson sent his fourth annual message to Congress. The message "was stridently states' rights and agrarian in its tone and thrust" and disavowed protection as anything other than a temporary expedient. His intent regarding nullification, as communicated to Van Buren, was "to pass it barely in review, as a mere buble [sic], view the existing laws as competent to check and put it down." He hoped to create a "moral force" that would transcend political parties and sections. The paragraph in the message that addressed nullification was:

It is my painful duty to state that in one quarter of the United States opposition to the revenue laws has arisen to a height which threatens to thwart their execution, if not to endanger the integrity of the Union. What ever obstructions may be thrown in the way of the judicial authorities of the General Government, it is hoped they will be able peaceably to overcome them by the prudence of their own officers and the patriotism of the people. But should this reasonable reliance on the moderation and good sense of all portions of our fellow citizens be disappointed, it is believed that the laws themselves are fully adequate to the suppression of such attempts as may be immediately made. Should the exigency arise rendering the execution of the existing laws impracticable from any cause what ever, prompt notice of it will be given to Congress, with a suggestion of such views and measures as may be deemed necessary to meet it.

On December 10, Jackson issued the Proclamation to the People of South Carolina, in which he characterized the positions of the nullifiers as "impractical absurdity" and "a metaphysical subtlety, in pursuit of an impractical theory." He provided this concise statement of his belief:

I consider, then, the power to annul a law of the United States, assumed by one State, incompatible with the existence of the Union, contradicted expressly by the letter of the Constitution, unauthorized by its spirit, inconsistent with every principle on which It was founded, and destructive of the great object for which it was formed.

The language Jackson used, combined with the reports out of South Carolina, raised the spectre of military confrontation for many on both sides of the issue. A group of Democrats, led by Van Buren and Thomas Hart Benton, among others, saw the only solution to the crisis in a substantial reduction of the tariff.

== Negotiation and confrontation (1833) ==
In apparent contradiction of his previous claim that the tariff could be enforced with existing laws, on January 16 Jackson sent his Force Bill Message to Congress. Custom houses in Beaufort and Georgetown would be closed and replaced by ships at each port. In Charleston, the custom house would be moved to either Castle Pinckney or Fort Moultrie in Charleston Harbor. Direct payment rather than bonds would be required, and federal jails would be established for violators the state refused to arrest and all cases arising under the state's nullification act could be removed to the United States Circuit Court. In the most controversial part, the militia acts of 1795 and 1807 would be revised to permit the enforcement of the customs laws by both the militia and the regular United States military. Attempts were made in South Carolina to shift the debate away from nullification by focusing instead on the proposed enforcement.

The Force bill went to the Senate Judiciary Committee, chaired by Pennsylvania protectionist William Wilkins and supported by members Daniel Webster and Theodore Frelinghuysen of New Jersey; it gave Jackson everything he asked. On January 28, the Senate defeated a motion by a vote of 30 to 15 to postpone debate on the bill. All but two of the votes to delay were from the lower South and only three from this section voted against the motion. This did not signal any increased support for nullification, but did signify doubts about enforcement. To draw more votes, proposals were made to limit the duration of the coercive powers and restrict the use of force to suppressing, rather than preventing, civil disorder. In the House, the Judiciary Committee voted 4–3 to reject Jackson's request to use force. By the time Calhoun made a major speech on February 15 strongly opposing it, the Force Bill was temporarily stalled.

On the tariff issue, the drafting of a compromise tariff was assigned in December to the House Ways and Means Committee, now headed by Gulian C. Verplanck. Debate on the committee's product on the House floor began in January 1833. The Verplanck tariff proposed reductions back to 1816 levels over the next two years while maintaining the basic principle of protectionism. The anti-Jackson protectionists saw this as an economic disaster that did not even allow the Tariff of 1832 to be tested and "an undignified truckling to the menaces and blustering of South Carolina." Northern Democrats did not oppose it in principle, but still demanded protection for the varying interests of their own constituents. Those sympathetic to the nullifiers wanted a specific abandonment of the principle of protectionism and were willing to offer a longer transition period as a bargaining point. The Verplanck tariff was clearly not going to be implemented.

In South Carolina, efforts were being made to avoid an unnecessary confrontation. Governor Hayne ordered the 25,000 troops he had created to train at home rather than gather in Charleston. At a mass meeting in Charleston on January 21, they decided to postpone the February 1 deadline for implementing nullification, while Congress worked on a compromise tariff. At the same time, a commissioner from Virginia, Benjamin W. Leigh, arrived in Charleston bearing resolutions that criticized both Jackson and the nullifiers and offering his state as a mediator.

Clay had not taken his defeat in the presidential election well and was unsure what position he could take in the tariff negotiations. His long-term concern was that Jackson was determined to kill protectionism along with the American Plan. In February, after consulting with manufacturers and sugar interests in Louisiana, who favored protection for the sugar industry, Clay started to work on a specific compromise plan. As a starting point, he accepted the nullifiers' offer of a transition period, but extended it from seven and a half years to nine years with a final target of a 20% ad valorem rate. After first securing the support of his protectionist base, Clay, through an intermediary, broached the subject with Calhoun. Calhoun was receptive, and after a private meeting with Clay at Clay's boardinghouse, negotiations proceeded.

Clay introduced the negotiated tariff bill on February 12, and it was immediately referred to a select committee consisting of Clay as chairman, Felix Grundy of Tennessee, George M. Dallas of Pennsylvania, William Cabell Rives of Virginia, Webster, John M. Clayton of Delaware, and Calhoun. On February 21, the committee reported a bill to the floor of the Senate that was largely Clay's original bill. The Tariff of 1832 would continue except that reduction of all rates above 20% would be reduced by one tenth every two years, with the final reductions back to 20% coming in 1842. Protectionism as a principle was not abandoned and provisions were made for raising the tariff if national interests demanded it.

Although not specifically linked by any negotiated agreement, it became clear that the Force Bill and Compromise Tariff of 1833 were inexorably linked. In his February 25 speech ending the debate on the tariff, Clay captured the spirit of the voices for compromise by condemning Jackson's Proclamation to South Carolina as inflammatory, admitting the same problem with the Force Bill, but indicating its necessity, and praising the Compromise Tariff as the final measure to restore balance, promote the rule of law, and avoid the "sacked cities", "desolated fields", and "smoking ruins" he said the failure to reach a final accord would produce. The House passed the Compromise Tariff, 119–85, and the Force Bill, 149–48. In the Senate, the tariff passed 29–16 and the Force bill 32–1, with many opponents of it walking out rather than voting.

Calhoun rushed to Charleston with the news of the final compromises. The Nullification Convention met again on March 11. It repealed the November Nullification Ordinance and also, "in a purely symbolic gesture", nullified the Force Bill. While the nullifiers claimed victory on the tariff issue, even though they had made concessions, the verdict was very different on nullification. The majority had in the end ruled and this boded ill for the South and its minority's hold on slavery. Rhett summed this up at the convention on March 13. Warning that "A people, owning slaves, are mad, or worse than mad, who do not hold their destinies in their own hands," he continued:

Every stride of this Government, over your rights, brings it nearer and nearer to your peculiar policy. ... The whole world are in arms against your institutions ... Let Gentlemen not be deceived. It is not the Tariff—not Internal Improvement—nor yet the Force bill, which constitutes the great evil against which we are contending. ... These are but the forms in which the despotic nature of the government is evinced—but it is the despotism which constitutes the evil: and until this Government is made a limited Government ... there is no liberty—no security for the South.

== Aftermath ==
People reflected on the meaning of the nullification crisis and its outcome for the country. On May 1, 1833, Jackson predicted, "the tariff was only a pretext, and disunion and Southern confederacy the real object. The next pretext will be the negro, or slavery question."

The final resolution of the crisis and Jackson's leadership had appeal throughout the North and South. Robert V. Remini, the historian and Jackson biographer, described the opposition that nullification drew from Southern states that traditionally advocated for states' rights:

The Alabama legislature, for example, pronounced the doctrine "unsound in theory and dangerous in practice." Georgia said it was "mischievous", "rash and revolutionary". Mississippi lawmakers chided the South Carolinians for acting with "reckless precipitancy".

The historian Forrest McDonald, describing the split over nullification among proponents of states' rights, wrote, "The doctrine of states' rights, as embraced by most Americans, was not concerned exclusively, or even primarily, with state resistance to federal authority." But by the end of the nullification crisis, many Southerners questioned whether Jacksonian Democrats still represented Southern interests. The historian William J. Cooper Jr. notes, "Numerous Southerners had begun to perceive it [the Jacksonian Democratic Party] as a spear aimed at the South rather than a shield defending the South."

In the political vacuum created by this alienation, the Southern wing of the Whig Party was formed. The party was a coalition of interests united by the common thread of opposition to Jackson, and more specifically to his "definition of federal and executive power." The party included former National Republicans with an "urban, commercial, and nationalist outlook", as well as former nullifiers. Emphasizing that "they were more southern than the Democrats," the party grew within the South by going "after the abolition issue with unabashed vigor and glee." With both parties arguing who could best defend Southern institutions, the nuances of the differences between free soil and abolitionism, which became an issue in the late 1840s with the Mexican War and territorial expansion, never became part of the political dialogue. This failure increased the slavery issue's volatility.

Richard Ellis argues that the end of the crisis signified the beginning of a new era. Within the states' rights movement, the traditional desire for "a weak, inactive, and frugal government" was challenged. Ellis writes, "in the years leading up to the Civil War the nullifiers and their proslavery allies used the doctrine of states' rights and state sovereignty in such a way as to try to expand the powers of the federal government so that it could more effectively protect the peculiar institution." By the 1850s, states' rights had become a call for state equality under the Constitution.

Madison reacted to this incipient tendency by writing two paragraphs of "Advice to My Country", found among his papers. It said that the Union "should be cherished and perpetuated. Let the open enemy to it be regarded as a Pandora with her box opened; and the disguised one, as the Serpent creeping with his deadly wiles into paradise." Richard Rush published this "Advice" in 1850, by which time Southern spirit was so high that it was denounced as a forgery.

The first test for the South over slavery began during the final congressional session of 1835. In what became known as the Gag Rule Debates, abolitionists flooded Congress with petitions to end slavery in the District of Columbia, where states' rights was not an issue. The debate was reopened each session as Southerners, led by South Carolinians Henry Pinckney and John Hammond, prevented the petitions from even being officially received by Congress. Led by John Quincy Adams, the slavery debate remained on the national stage until late 1844, when Congress lifted all restrictions on processing the petitions.

Describing the legacy of the crisis, Sean Wilentz writes:

The battle between Jacksonian democratic nationalists, northern and southern, and nullifier sectionalists would resound through the politics of slavery and antislavery for decades to come. Jackson's victory, ironically, would help accelerate the emergence of southern pro-slavery as a coherent and articulate political force, which would help solidify northern antislavery opinion, inside as well as outside Jackson's party. Those developments would accelerate the emergence of two fundamentally incompatible democracies, one in the slave South, the other in the free North.

For South Carolina, the legacy of the crisis involved both the divisions within the state during the crisis and the apparent isolation of the state as the crisis was resolved. By 1860, when it became the first state to secede, it was more internally united than any other Southern state. Historian Charles Edward Cauthen writes:

Probably to a greater extent than in any other Southern state South Carolina had been prepared by her leaders over a period of thirty years for the issues of 1860. Indoctrination in the principles of state sovereignty, education in the necessity of maintaining Southern institutions, warnings of the dangers of control of the federal government by a section hostile to its interests—in a word, the education of the masses in the principles and necessity of secession under certain circumstances—had been carried on with a skill and success hardly inferior to the masterly propaganda of the abolitionists themselves. It was this education, this propaganda, by South Carolina leaders which made secession the almost spontaneous movement that it was.

== See also ==
- Origins of the American Civil War
- American School (economics)
- Friedrich List

== Sources ==
- Brant, Irving (1970). The Fourth President: a Life of James Madison. Bobbs-Merrill. ISBN 978-0672506741.
- Buel, Richard Jr. America on the Brink: How the Political Struggle Over the War of 1812 Almost Destroyed the Young Republic (2005) ISBN 1-4039-6238-3
- Cauthen, Charles Edward. South Carolina Goes to War (1950) ISBN 1-57003-560-1
- Cooper, William J. Jr. The South and the Politics of Slavery 1828–1856 (1978) ISBN 0-8071-0385-3
- Craven, Avery. The Coming of the Civil War (1942) ISBN 0-226-11894-0
- Ellis, Richard E. The Union at Risk: Jacksonian Democracy, States' Rights, and the Nullification Crisis (1987)
- Freehling, William W. (1990). The Road To Disunion: Secessionists at Bay, 1776–1854. Vol. 1. Oxford University Press. ISBN 978-0-19-505814-7.
- Freehling, William W. Prelude to Civil War: The Nullification Crisis in South Carolina 1816–1836 (1965) ISBN 0-19-507681-8
- Howe, Daniel Walker. What Hath God Wrought: The Transformation of America, 1815–1848. (2007) ISBN 978-0-19-507894-7
- McDonald, Forrest. States' Rights and the Union: Imperium in Imperio 1776–1876 (2000) ISBN 0-7006-1040-5
- Meacham, Jon. American lion : Andrew Jackson in the White House (online)
- Niven, John. John C. Calhoun and the Price of Union (1988) ISBN 0-8071-1451-0
- Peterson, Merrill D. The Great Triumvirate: Webster, Clay, and Calhoun (1987) ISBN 0-19-503877-0
- Remini, Robert V. Andrew Jackson and the Course of American Freedom, 1822–1832, v2 (1981) ISBN 0-06-014844-6
- Remini, Robert V. Andrew Jackson and the Course of American Democracy, 1833–1845, v3 (1984) ISBN 0-06-015279-6
- Remini, Robert V. Henry Clay: Statesman for the Union (1991) ISBN 0-393-31088-4
- Tuttle, Charles A. (Court Reporter) California Digest: A Digest of the Reports of the Supreme Court of California, Volume 26 (1906)
- Walther, Eric C. The Fire-Eaters (1992) ISBN 0-8071-1731-5
- Wilentz, Sean. The Rise of American Democracy: Jefferson to Lincoln (2005) ISBN 0-393-05820-4
- Woods, Thomas E. Jr. Nullification (2010) ISBN 978-1-59698-149-2
