= Tariff of Abominations =

1828 United States tariff

Tariff of 1828
- Long title: An Act in alteration of the several acts imposing duties on imports
- Nicknames: Tariff of Abominations
- Enacted by: the 20th United States Congress
- Effective: September 1, 1828

Citations
- Statutes at Large: 4 Stat. 270

Codification
- Acts amended: Tariff of 1824
- Acts repealed: Tariff of 1832

Legislative history
- Committee consideration by House Committee on Manufactures; Signed into law by President John Quincy Adams on May 19, 1828

The Tariff of 1828 was a very high protective tariff that became law in the United States on May 19, 1828. It was a bill designed to fail in Congress because it was seen by free trade supporters as hurting both industry and farming, but it passed anyway. The bill was vehemently denounced in the South and escalated to a threat of civil war in the nullification crisis of 1832–33. The tariff was replaced in 1833, and the crisis ended. It was called the "Tariff of Abominations" by its Southern detractors because of the effects it had on the Southern economy. It set a 38% tax on some imported goods and a 45% tax on certain imported raw materials.

The manufacturing-based economy in the Northeastern states felt that it was suffering from low-priced imported manufactured items from Britain. The major goal of the tariff was to protect the factories by taxing imports from Europe. Southerners from the Cotton Belt, particularly those from South Carolina, felt they were harmed directly by having to pay more for imports from Europe. Allegedly, the South was also harmed indirectly because reducing exports of British goods to the U.S would make it difficult for the British to pay for Southern cotton. The reaction in the South, particularly in South Carolina, led to the nullification crisis.

== Background ==
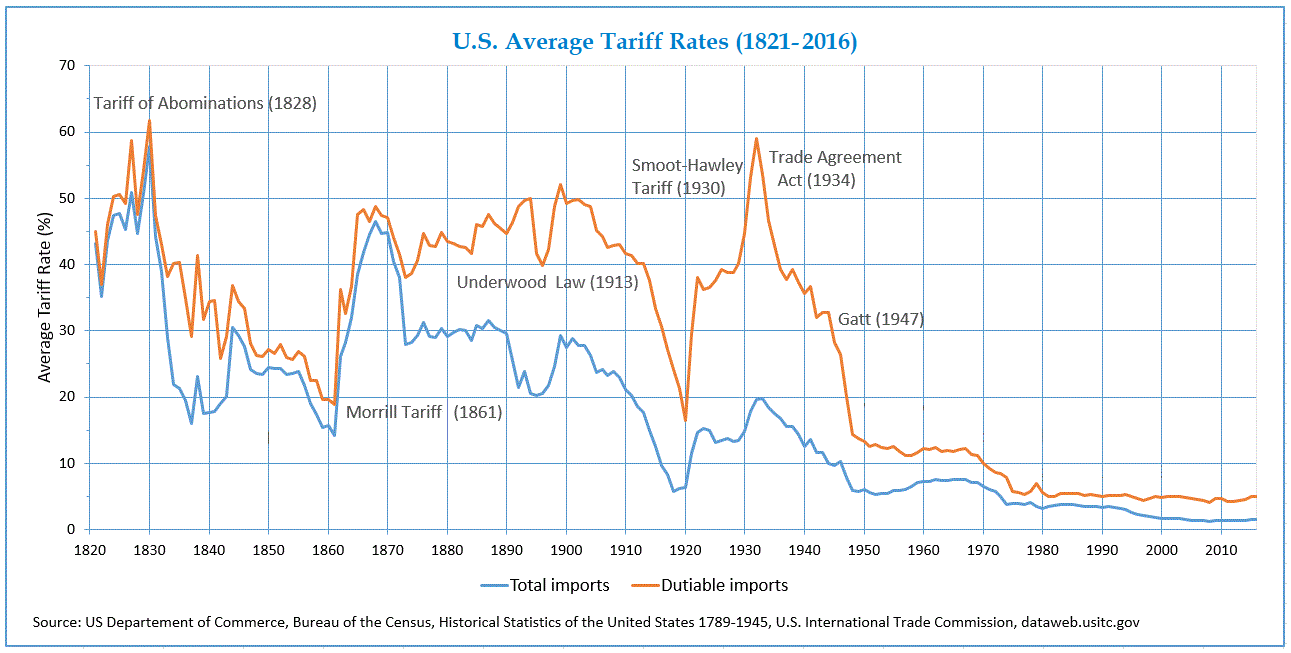
Average tariff rates in the U.S. (1821–2016)

The 1828 tariff was part of a series of American tariffs that began as a result of the Napoleonic Wars, when the Continental Blockade led British manufacturers to offer goods in America at low prices that American manufacturers often could not match. The first protective tariff was passed by Congress in 1816, and its rates were increased in 1824. Southern states such as South Carolina contended that the tariff was unconstitutional and were opposed to the newer protectionist tariffs, as they would have to pay, but Northern states favored them because they helped strengthen their industrial-based economy.

In an elaborate scheme to prevent passage of still higher tariffs, while at the same time appealing to Andrew Jackson's supporters in the North, John C. Calhoun and other Southerners joined Martin Van Buren in crafting a tariff bill that would also weigh heavily on materials imported by the New England states. It was believed that President John Quincy Adams's supporters in New England would uniformly oppose the bill for this reason and that the Southern legislators could then withdraw their support, killing the legislation while blaming it on the New Englanders. The goal was to write a bill so bad—so "abominable"—that it would never pass but would help Van Buren and the Southerners while hurting the Adams-Clay coalition.

== Bill passage ==
The House committee drafted a bill that imposed very high duties on raw materials, including iron, hemp (for rope) and flax, but eliminated the protective features on woolen goods. The alliance organized by Van Buren that included the middle states and the south voted down every attempt by New Englanders to amend the bill. The alliance was confident the bill was so unfavorable that it would be defeated in Congress, hurting Adams and Clay in the process. To the astonishment of the alliance, a substantial minority of New England's members of Congress voted for the final bill, on the grounds that the principle of protection was of enormous value (and to agree with the Southerners). The bill passed the house 105 to 94 on April 23 and passed the Senate 26 to 21 on May 13. President Adams signed it and the tariff became law. Adams became a hated man in the South.

Farmers in Western states and manufacturers in the Mid-Atlantic states argued that the strengthening of the nation was in the interest of the entire country. This same reasoning swayed two-fifths of U.S. Representatives in the New England states to vote for the tariff increase. In 1824, New England was on the verge of bankruptcy due to the influx of the use of European cloth. New England was in favor of the tariff increase for entering goods from Europe to aid in the country's economic success.

House vote on Tariff of 1828	For	Against
New England (Massachusetts, Connecticut, Rhode Island, Vermont, New Hampshire, Maine)	16	23
Mid-Atlantic (New York, New Jersey, Pennsylvania, Delaware)	56	6
West (Ohio, Indiana, Illinois, Missouri)	29	1
South (South Carolina, Mississippi, Louisiana, Georgia, Virginia, North Carolina, Tennessee, Kentucky, Alabama, Maryland)	4	64
Total	105	94
Free states	88	29
Slave states	17	65

A substantial minority of New England Congressmen (41%) saw what they believed to be long-term national benefits of an increased tariff, and voted for it; they believed the tariff would strengthen the manufacturing industry nationally (see table).

The Democratic Party had miscalculated: despite the insertion by Democrats of import duties calculated to be unpalatable to New England industries, most specifically on raw wool imports, essential to the wool textile industry, the New Englanders failed to sink the legislation, and the Southerners' plan backfired.

The 1828 tariff was signed by President Adams, although he realized it could weaken him politically. In the presidential election of 1828, Andrew Jackson defeated Adams with a popular tally of 642,553 votes and an electoral count of 178 as opposed to Adams's 500,897 tally and 83 electoral votes.

== Effects of the tariff in 1828 ==
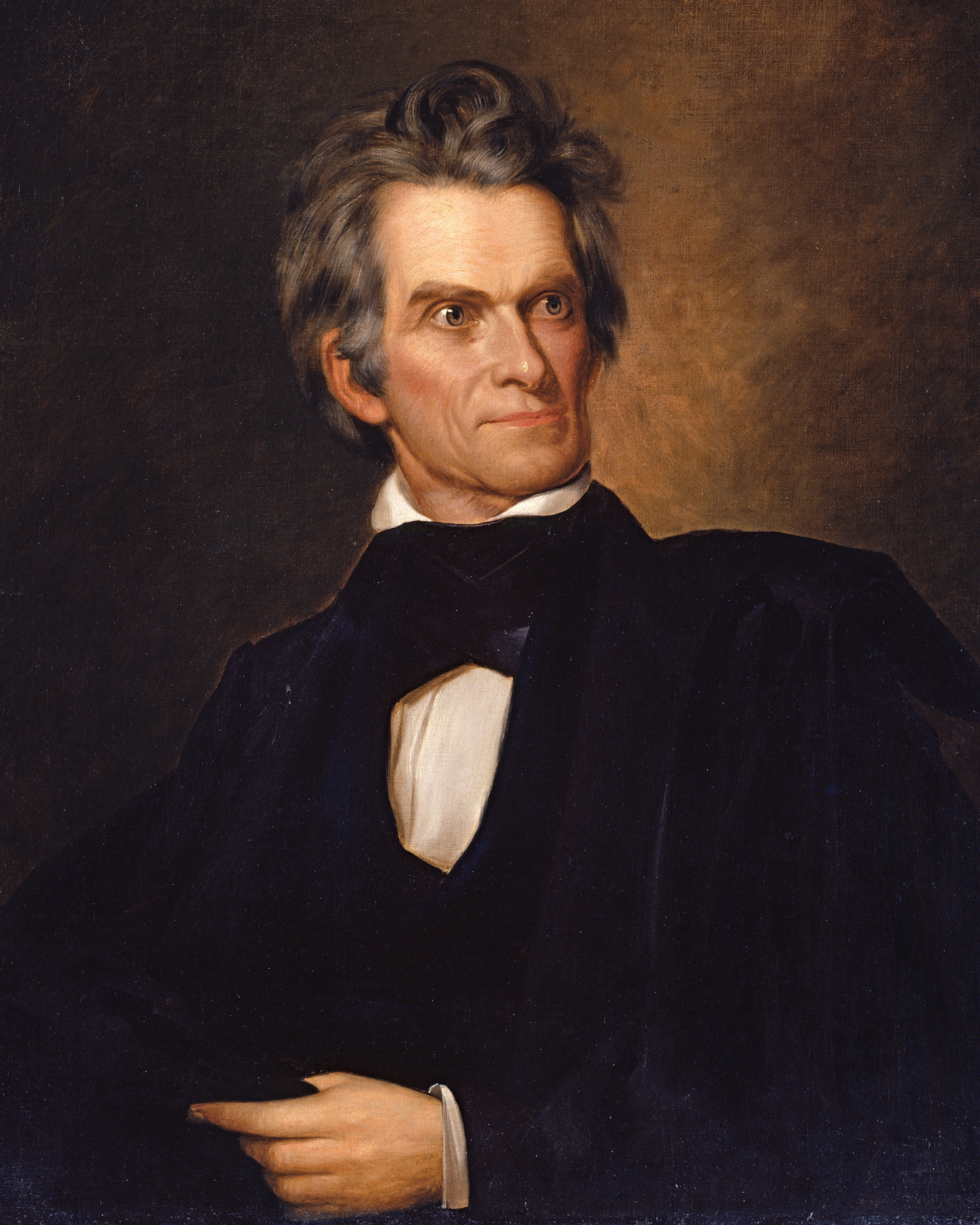
John C. Calhoun

Vice President John C. Calhoun of South Carolina strongly opposed the tariff, anonymously authoring a pamphlet in December 1828 titled the South Carolina Exposition and Protest, in which he urged nullification of the tariff within South Carolina. The South Carolina legislature, although it printed and distributed 5,000 copies of the pamphlet, took none of the legislative action that the pamphlet urged.

The expectation of the tariff's opponents was that with the election of Jackson in 1828, the tariff would be significantly reduced. Jackson in 1829 said the 1828 tariff was constitutional. In response, the most radical faction in South Carolina began to advocate that the state itself declare the tariff null and void within South Carolina.

In Washington, an open split on the issue occurred between Jackson and Vice-President Calhoun. On July 14, 1832, Jackson signed into law the Tariff of 1832 which made some reductions in tariff rates. Calhoun finally resigned.

The reductions were too little for South Carolina—the "abominations" of 1828 were still there. In November 1832 the state called for a convention. By a vote of 136 to 26, the convention overwhelmingly adopted an ordinance of nullification drawn by Chancellor William Harper. It declared that the tariffs of both 1828 and 1832 were unconstitutional and unenforceable in South Carolina. President Jackson could not tolerate the nullification of a federal law by a state. He threatened war with South Carolina and Congress passed the Force Act. Cooler heads ultimately prevailed; the tariff was reduced. Thereafter, South Carolina withdrew its nullification of the tariff, but nullified the Force Act. When the federal government dispersed surplus revenue to the States, South Carolina rejected its portion out of principle. The nullification crisis was resolved with the Tariff of 1833, a compromise.

== See also ==
- Force Bill – 1833 United States law
- Protectionism in the United States
- Wrecking amendment – Change to a bill intended to prevent its passage
