= Tariff of 1832 =

Historical United States tariff

- Long title: An Act to alter and amend the several acts imposing duties on imports
- Enacted by: the 22nd United States Congress
- Effective: March 3, 1833

Citations
- Statutes at Large: 4 Stat. 583

Codification
- Acts amended: Tariff of 1828
- Acts repealed: Tariff of 1833

Legislative history
- Committee consideration by House Committee on Manufactures; Signed into law by President Andrew Jackson on July 14, 1832

The Tariff of 1832 (22nd Congress, session 1, ch. 227, 4 Stat. 583, enacted July 14, 1832) was a protectionist tariff in the United States. Enacted under Andrew Jackson's presidency, it was largely written by former president John Quincy Adams, who had been elected to the House of Representatives and appointed chairman of the Committee on Manufactures. It reduced the existing tariffs to remedy the conflict created by the Tariff of Abominations, but it was still deemed unsatisfactory by some in the Southern United States, especially in South Carolina, causing the nullification crisis. As a result of this crisis, the 1832 Tariff was replaced by the Compromise Tariff of 1833.

== The Tariff of 1832 ==
Enacted on July 13, 1832, this was referred to as a protectionist tariff in the United States. The purpose of this tariff was to act as a remedy for the conflict created by the Tariff of 1828. The protective Tariff of 1828 was primarily created to protect the rapidly growing industry-based economy of the North. Because of this, the Tariff of 1828 was also called the Tariff of Abominations by Southern states, as it seemed unfair on the part of the government to favor the North's economic and sociopolitical power by forcefully reducing the value of the South's agricultural-based economy by imposing excessive tariffs on goods imported by the South. As compared to the gross economic disparity created by the protective Tariff of 1832, it proved to be an unsatisfactory measure by Northern politicians to quell the protests rising from the South. Its predecessor pushed the duties on citizens which were as high as 45% on the value of specific manufactured goods, while the Tariff of 1832 act brought it down to 35%. For instance, the tariffs on hemp, which had been raised to $60 a ton in 1828, was reduced to a $40 a ton in 1832, as a result of a tariff enacted that same year by a Northern-dominated federal congress. Even then Southerners were not happy with it. Eventually, their unrest and dissatisfaction was what led to the nullification crisis. Along with that, another bill was passed, Tariff of 1833.

== Tariff of 1832 and Nullification Crisis ==
The Southern states remained displeased with the high rates of the Tariff of 1832. As a result, in 1833, a sectional crisis called the Nullification Crisis happened during the presidency of Andrew Jackson. In South Carolina's Ordinance of nullification, by the power of the state, the Federal Tariffs of 1828 and 1832 were declared unconstitutional in November 1832. As a result, they were null and void within the 'sovereign' boundaries of South Carolina, because the reductions provided for in the Tariff of 1832 were too little for South Carolina. Due to the precarious economic situation during the 1820s, South Carolina was the state which had particularly borne the brunt of the economic downturn. The result was that by 1828, the politics of South Carolina increasingly revolved around the issue of tariffs. In Washington, the President and the Vice President differed on the issue. John Calhoun, the Vice President, later quit his office to defend the nullification process. In 1833, a bill authorizing the President the use of military forces against South Carolina was passed as a preemptive measure. Consequently, negotiations led to a tariff satisfactory to South Carolina being passed. Finally, South Carolina repealed its Nullification Ordinance in 1833 on March 26.

== House vote ==
| House Vote on Tariff of 1832 | For | Against |
|---|---|---|
| New England (Massachusetts, Connecticut, Rhode Island, Vermont, New Hampshire, Maine) | 27 | 6 |
| Middle States (New York, New Jersey, Pennsylvania, Delaware) | 51 | 10 |
| West (Ohio, Indiana, Illinois, Missouri, Kentucky) | 22 | 8 |
| South (South Carolina, Mississippi, Louisiana, Georgia, Virginia, North Carolina, Tennessee, Alabama, Maryland | 32 | 36 |
| Total | 132 | 60 |
| Free states | 92 | 18 |
| Slave states | 40 | 42 |
