= Tariff of 1816 =

United States tariff

- Long title: An Act to regulate duties on imports and tonnage.
- Nicknames: Dallas Tariff
- Enacted by: the 14th United States Congress
- Effective: April 27, 1816

Citations
- Statutes at Large: 3 Stat. 189

Codification
- Titles amended: 19 U.S.C.: Customs Duties

Legislative history
- Introduced in the House of Representatives; Committee consideration by House Ways and Means; Passed the House of Representatives on April 1816; Passed the Senate on April 1816; Signed into law by President James Madison on April 27, 1816

The Tariff of 1816, also known as the Dallas Tariff, is notable as the first tariff passed by Congress with an explicit function of protecting U.S. manufactured items from overseas competition. Prior to the War of 1812, tariffs had primarily served to raise revenues to operate the national government. Another unique aspect of the tariff was the strong support it received from Southern states.

The bill was conceived as part of a solution to the purely domestic matter of avoiding a projected federal deficit reported by Secretary of the Treasury Alexander J. Dallas. International developments added key facts to the debate; in 1816 there was widespread concern among Americans that war with the United Kingdom might be rekindled over economic and territorial issues. A tariff on manufactured goods, including war industry products, was deemed essential in the interests of national defense.

The tariff was approved on April 27, 1816, as a temporary measure, authorized for only three years (until June 1820). Northern efforts to establish permanent protection in 1820, after tensions with Britain had eased, provoked a backlash among Southern legislators. The South consistently opposed protective tariffs during the remainder of the antebellum period.

== US manufacturing advances in the Napoleonic Era ==
The trade restrictions imposed by Britain and France during the Napoleonic Wars, the US Embargo Act of 1807 and non-intercourse policies, as well as the War of 1812: all these crises led Americans to develop domestic manufactures to provide goods formerly supplied by Europe. Through necessity American domestic industries had grown and diversified significantly, especially cotton and woolen textiles, and iron production.

Sectional characteristics of the country were also taking shape: the Northeast was transitioning from trade and shipping towards industrial enterprises; the Deep South concentrating on cotton cultivation, and the West seeking transportation routes to market their agricultural goods.

Despite these sectional developments, America emerged from the War of 1812 as a young nation-state, with a renewed sense of self-reliance and common identity.

== Post-War European threats and the rise of US economic nationalism ==
The Treaty of Ghent in December 1814 did not resolve US–British boundary and territorial disputes in Louisiana and Spanish Florida. The frontier remained a flashpoint for international strife. In addition, tensions between British and American manufacturers continued to exist. In a move to recapture American markets, British manufacturers proceeded to systematically flood the US markets with superior manufactured items at cut-rate prices, which caused their American counterparts, particularly those in the Northeast, to rapidly lose business.

These geostrategic and economic tensions led to a shift in American domestic policy. The strict constructionist ideologists of the dominant Jeffersonian Republican Party – though averse to concentrating power into the hands of the federal government – recognized the expediency of nationalizing certain institutions and projects as a means of achieving national growth and economic security.

In his Seventh Annual Message to the Fourteenth Congress on December 5, 1815, President James Madison suggested legislation to create 1) a national bank with regulatory powers 2) a program of federally funded internal improvements for roads and canals, and 3) a protective tariff to shelter emerging American manufacturing from the advanced industries in Europe.

== The Federal deficit and the tariff debate ==
In December 1815, Treasury Secretary Alexander J. Dallas presented a federal budget report to Congress projecting a substantial government deficit by the end of 1816. Though his budget figures were not in dispute, the means of raising the funds were, and proposals for direct or excise taxes were generally unpopular. Secretary Dallas called for a limited protective tariff on manufactures to forestall the deficit. His proposal provoked opposition from two economic sectors: commerce and agriculture.

Commercial maritime centers in New England and the Mid-Atlantic states had anticipated a lucrative import and export exchange with the post-war reopening of European and global markets. A protective tariff might provoke retaliatory measures, impeding free trade and profits.

Agrarians in most regions of the US were also advocates of open markets. Northerners, like most Southerners, were still farmers (84% for the whole country). The North, however, was increasingly industrial, with 20 percent of its workforce engaged in manufacturing, compared to 8 percent in the South. Southerner planters, committed to a pastoral slave-based culture and economy, were net consumers of manufactured goods – goods which would cost more under a tariff regime. The South expressed hostility to the measure throughout the debates, but a substantial number ultimately were compelled to consider its protective advantages.

Support for the duties was strongest in manufacturing centers, the immediate beneficiaries of the protection, particularly in Pennsylvania and New York. The tariff was also popular in Kentucky, among those who hoped to develop new textile industries weaving locally grown hemp. Economic interests aside, "both protectionists and freetraders were in agreement that the country needed more revenue"

== The reasons for Southern support of the tariff ==
The tariff of 1816 was the first – and last – protective tariff that received significant Southern support during the "thirty-year tariff war" from 1816 to 1846. A number of historical factors were important in shaping Southern perceptions of the legislation. Acknowledging the need to provide sufficient government funding, and with no adequate alternative propositions, the South felt compelled to consider protection. Southern support of the tariff was not demonstrably linked to any significant trend towards industry in the South, or to the existence of textile mills in the Congressional districts of Southern representatives.

Southern legislators were keenly aware of the effect that British merchants were having on the US economy and emerging American industries by flooding manufactured goods onto the US market. A group of Southern politicians known as the War Hawks had been some of the most strident foes of confrontation with Britain and fierce champions of the national government; among these statesmen were Speaker of the House Henry Clay of Kentucky, Henry St. George Tucker, Sr. of Virginia and Alexander C. Hanson of Maryland, all supporting the tariff as a war measure.

There were fears among Americans that economic tensions with Britain would lead to a resumption of armed conflict. In that event, a healthy US manufacturing base – including war industries – were vital to the American economy. Rejecting doctrinaire anti-Federalism, Representative John C. Calhoun of South Carolina called for national unity through interdependence of trade, agriculture and manufacturing. Recalling how poorly prepared the United States had been for war in 1812, he demanded that American factories be provided protection. John Quincy Adams, as US minister to Great Britain, concurred with Calhoun, discerning a deep hostility from the capitals of Europe towards the fledgling United States.

Old Republicans (also known as "tertium quids"), such as Representative John Randolph of Virginia, were marginal figures in this struggle, where strict constructionists were at their nadir. This faction of the Jeffersonian Republican Party remained adamant in upholding the principles of state sovereignty and limited government, rejecting any protection whatsoever as an assault upon "poor men and on slaveholders". Among more moderate Southern leaders who remained skeptical about supporting an openly protectionist tariff, there were four additional considerations:

First, the tariff was understood to be a temporary expedient to deal with clear and present dangers. The duties would be lowered in three years (June 1819) by which time the strife would likely have subsided.

Second, the tariff would only be applied to cotton and woolen products, and iron; the bulk of imported goods the South regularly bought from foreign countries would not be affected.

Third, the agrarian South was economically prosperous at the time of the debates, easing concerns about the financial burden the tariff would impose. Those who backed tariffs believed that the economic benefits that would accrue to the North and the West were in the national interest, and that the South could absorb a mild and temporary increase in the cost of imported goods.

Finally, Jeffersonian Republicans, emerging from the War of 1812 with the opposition Federalist Party in disgrace, felt sufficiently in control of the political landscape to permit an experiment in centralizing policies.

== The passage of the tariff ==
As a protective measure, the tariff legislation was very temperate. It placed a duty of twenty-five percent on cottons and woolens for a period of three years (until June 1819), at which time it would drop to twenty percent. A duty of thirty percent was placed on iron, leather, hats, writing paper and cabinet ware, as well as three cents on a pound of sugar. (Iron duties were further increased in 1818 as a defense measure.)

Low grade printed fabrics from British India, however cheaply they were priced, were accessed at a fixed rate of twenty-five cents per square yard. This was the only overtly protective feature of the legislation, and served to exclude these foreign textiles altogether from US markets.

The bill – requiring a simple majority for passage – passed 88 yeas to 54 nays in the House (62% to 38%). Both parties were divided, with Republicans voting nationwide 63 yeas to 31 nays, and the Federalists voting 25 yeas to 23 nays.

== The influence of détente on support for protection ==
A gradual easing of British-American territorial and economic disputes commenced shortly after the passage of the Dallas tariff.

The Rush–Bagot Treaty of 1817 demilitarized the Great Lakes regions and the following year the Treaty of 1818 drew the forty-ninth parallel from the Lake of the Woods west to the Rocky Mountains. With this, Britain tacitly acknowledged the legitimacy of US claims to the vast Louisiana territory.

Another potentially volatile international development – General Andrew Jackson's military incursion into Spanish Florida and his summary execution of two British citizens – failed to incite British retaliation, diplomatically or militarily. The Adams–Onís Treaty of 1819 transferred all of Florida into US hands, ending Spain's attempts to enlist British help in recovering Louisiana from the United States. By 1820, US–British diplomatic relations had significantly improved.

British mercantilist policies and trade monopolies also weakened during this period. Britain recognized that its prosperity was inextricably connected to the industrial growth and territorial expansion of the United States. British–American trade wars had virtually vanished by 1820 and with it the argument that protectionist tariffs were necessary to sustain war industries.

In the three years following the passage of the Dallas tariff, the issues that prompted appeals for protection – trade wars, geostrategic disputes and the federal deficit – had largely been resolved.

== The Panic of 1819 and the end of Southern protectionism ==
The tariff of 1816 supplied comfortable federal surpluses from 1817 to 1819; even with the scheduled reduction in duty rates for 1819, the tariff was expected to provide sufficient revenue.

The Panic of 1819 caused an alarming, but temporary drop in the projected federal revenue for 1820. Manufacturers and other protectionists, as well as agrarian anti-protectionists, agreed that the existing tariff of 1816 would perform adequately during the economic recovery. Secretary Dallas warned that any increase in customs on cotton, wool and iron during the economic crisis would actually depress revenues further.

Protectionists were eager to distance themselves from the revenue issue – if revenues were adequate, they could hardly argue for an increase in duties. Manufacturers sought a new argument to support higher tariffs – economic distress due to the downturn. In reality, the Panic had benefited manufacturing by causing a drop in the price of raw materials; even as the retail sales of the cotton goods plummeted, so did the wholesale cost of raw cotton – textile producers could still turn a profit. The primary producers in the agricultural South, however, saw the value of their goods decline and sell at a loss.

By 1820, the support for higher tariffs was less an argument for government revenue, than an effort by Western and Northern interests to establish protection as a principle of economic national well-being. Unlike the tariff in 1816, the tariff legislation in 1820 included higher duties and a long list of new items, and the duties were to be permanent. No longer a mere expedient, this tariff reflected the new loose constructionist principles of the National Republicans, deviating from the strict constructionist requirements of the Democratic-Republican wing of the party. This the Southern agrarians could not abide, when no external threat to the nation at large remained.

Historian Norris W. Preyer summarized the shift in Southern opinion this way:

By 1820 the South realized that the earlier arguments and appeals of protectionism were no longer valid. In 1816 it was not a desire for manufacturing, but a combination of prosperity, patriotism, and promises that had swayed Southerners. None of these factors now existed to influence them. One consideration, however, which had always been a strong influence on the thinking of Southerners still remained – the need to defend their economic interests. Now, with no other views to challenge or obscure this desire, the South turned almost unanimously against the tariff bill of 1820. The brief Southern experiment in supporting protection had come to an end, and from then on that section would consistently oppose all protective tariffs.

== Bibliography ==
=== Cited in footnotes ===
- Bancroft, Hubert H. 1902. The protective tariff, in The Great Republic By the Master Historians, Vol. III,
- Brown, Richard H. 1966. The Missouri Crisis, Slavery, and the Politics of Jacksonianism. South Atlantic Quarterly, pp. 55–72, in Essays on Jacksonian America, Ed. Frank Otto Gatell. New York: Holt, Rinehart and Winston, 1970.
- Commager and Morris. 1965. Introduction to The Awakening of American Nationalism: 1815–1828. Harper & Row. New York.
- Dangerfield, George. 1965. The Awakening of American Nationalism: 1815–1828. Harper & Row. New York.
- Gatell, Frank O. 1970. Essays on Jacksonian America, Ed. Frank Otto Gatell. Holt, Rinehart and Winston, Inc. New York.
- Goodrich, Carter. 1948. "The National Planning of Internal Improvements". Political Science Quarterly, LXIII (March 1948), 16–44 in Essays on Jacksonian America, Ed. Frank Otto Gatell. Holt, Rinehart and Winston, Inc. New York . 1970.
- Preyer, Norris W. 1959. "Southern Support of the Tariff of 1816: A Reappraisal" Journal of Southern History, XXV (August 1959, pp. 306–322) in Essays on Jacksonian America, Ed. Frank Otto Gatell. Holt, Rinehart and Winston, Inc. New York . 1970.
- Remini, Robert V. 1991. Henry Clay: Statesman for the Union. W.W. Norton and Co. New York.
- Webroots – US History for the Early 19th century
- "Alexander James Dallas." Dictionary of American Biography Base Set. American Council of Learned Societies, 1928–1936. Reproduced in Biography Resource Center. Farmington Hills, Mich.: Thomson Gale. 2005.
- "Henry Clay." Gale Encyclopedia of U.S. Economic History Gale Group, 1999. Reproduced in Biography Resource Center. Farmington Hills.
