= A Disquisition on Government =

Treatise by John C. Calhoun published 1851

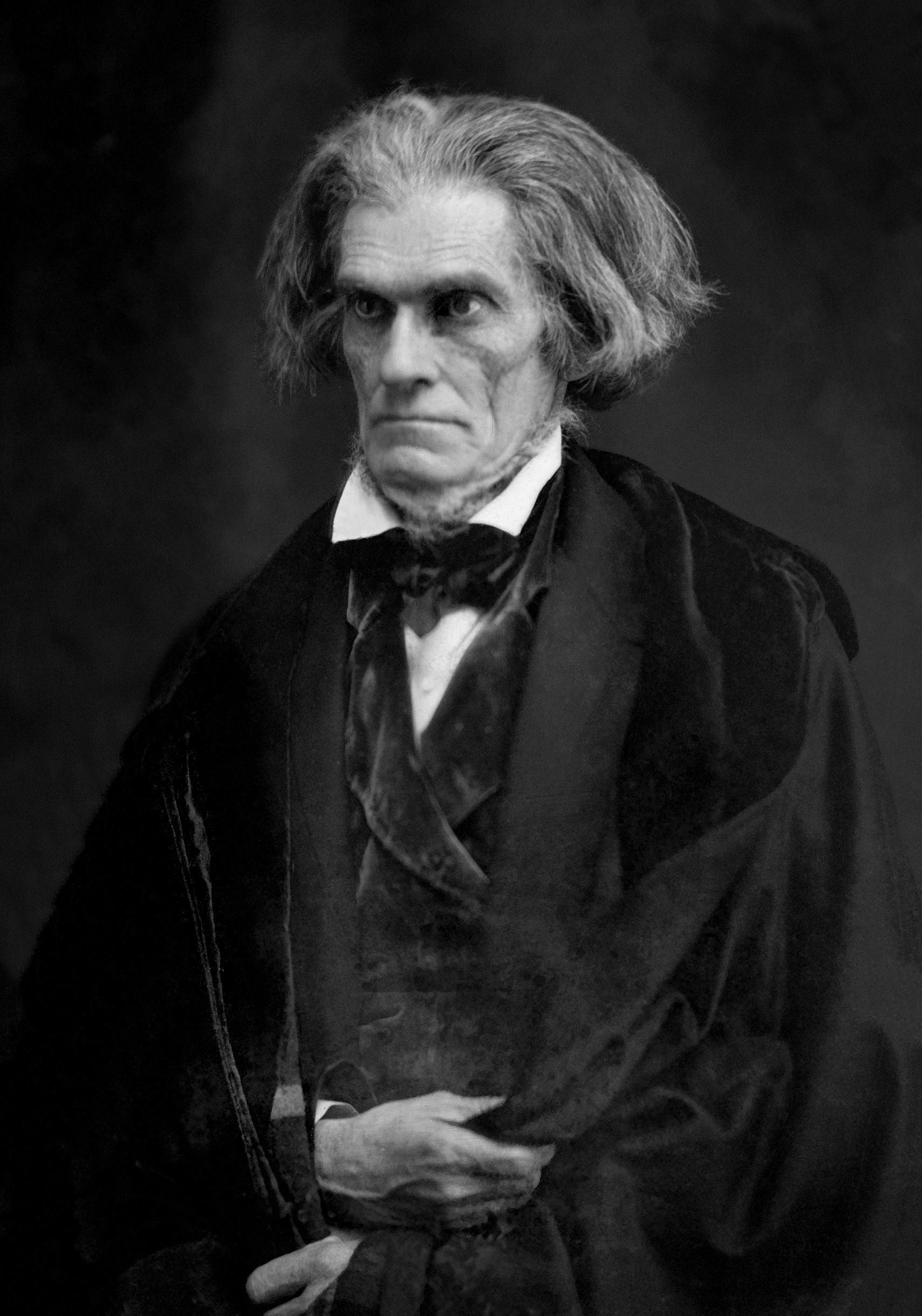
Calhoun photographed by Mathew Brady in 1849

A Disquisition on Government is a political treatise written by U.S. Senator John C. Calhoun of South Carolina and published posthumously in 1851. Written in response to what Calhoun saw as the growing subjugation of the Southern United States by the more populous Northern United States, especially in terms of Northern promotion of tariff legislation and opposition to slavery, the 100-page Disquisition promotes the idea of a concurrent majority in order to protect what he perceived to be the South's interests. The Disquisition, and other writings like it by Southern Fire-Eaters, increased the feeling of sectionalism in the South and led ultimately to secession and the American Civil War.

Calhoun died in 1850, and the Disquisition was published the following year.

== Premise ==
The Disquisition on Government is a 100-page essay on Calhoun's definitive and comprehensive ideas on government, which he worked on intermittently for six years until its 1849 completion. It systematically presents his arguments that a numerical majority in any government will typically impose a despotism over a minority unless some way is devised to secure the assent of all classes, sections, and interests and, similarly, that innate human depravity would debase government in a democracy.

== Summary ==
Calhoun offered the concurrent majority as the key to achieving consensus, a formula by which a minority interest had the option to nullify objectionable legislation passed by a majority interest. The consensus would be effected by this tactic of nullification, a veto that would suspend the law within the boundaries of the state.

Veto power was linked to the right of secession, which portended anarchy and social chaos. Constituencies would call for compromise to prevent this outcome. With a concurrent majority in place, the U.S. Constitution as interpreted by the Federal Judiciary would no longer exert collective authority over the various states. According to the Supremacy Clause located in Article 6, laws made by the federal government are the "supreme law of the land" only when they are made "in pursuance" of the U.S. Constitution.

These ideas are convincing if one shares Calhoun's conviction that a functioning concurrent majority never leads to stalemate in the legislature; rather, talented statesmen, practiced in the arts of conciliation and compromise would pursue "the common good", however explosive the issue. His formula promised to produce laws satisfactory to all interests. The ultimate goal of these mechanisms were to facilitate the authentic will of the white populace. Calhoun explicitly rejected the founding principles of equality in the Declaration of Independence, denying that humanity is born free and equal in shared nature and basic needs. He regarded this precept as "the most false and dangerous of all political errors". States could constitutionally take action to free themselves from an overweening government, but slaves as individuals or interest groups could not do so. Calhoun's stance assumed that with the establishment of a concurrent majority, minority groups would influence their own representatives sufficiently to have a voice in public affairs; the representatives would perform strictly as high-minded public servants. Under this scenario, the political leadership would improve and persist, corruption and demagoguery would subside, and the interests of the people would be honored. This introduces the second theme in the Disquisition, and a counterpoint to his concept of the concurrent majority—political corruption.

Calhoun considered the concurrent majority essential to provide structural restraints to governance, believing that "a vast majority of mankind is entirely biased by motives of self-interest and that by this interest must be governed". This innate selfishness would inevitably emerge when government revenue became available to political parties for distribution as patronage. Politicians and bureaucrats would succumb to the lure of government lucre accumulated through taxation, tariff duties and public land sales. Even a diminishment of massive revenue effected through nullification by the permanent minority would not eliminate these temptations. Calhoun predicted that electioneering, political conspiracies, and outright fraud would be employed to mislead and distract a gullible public; inevitably, perfidious demagogues would come to rule the political scene. A decline in authority among the principal statesmen would follow, and, ultimately, the eclipse of the concurrent majority.

Calhoun contended that however confused and misled the masses were by political opportunists, any efforts to impose majority rule upon a minority would be thwarted by a minority veto. What Calhoun fails to explain, according to American historian William W. Freehling, is how a compromise would be achieved in the aftermath of a minority veto, when the ubiquitous demagogues betray their constituencies and abandon the concurrent majority altogether. Calhoun's two key concepts – the maintenance of the concurrent majority by high-minded statesmen on the one hand; and the inevitable rise of demagogues who undermine consensus on the other – are never reconciled or resolved in the Disquisition.

South Carolina and other Southern states, in the three decades preceding the Civil War, provided legislatures in which the vested interests of land and slaves dominated in the upper houses, while the popular will of the numerical majority prevailed in the lower houses. There was little opportunity for demagogues to establish themselves in this political milieu – the democratic component among the people was too weak to sustain a plebeian politician. The conservative statesmen – the slaveholding gentry – retained control over the political apparatus. Freehling described the state's political system of the era thus:

[T]he apportionment of [state] legislative seats gave the small majority of low country aristocrats control of the senate and a disproportionate influence in the house. Political power in South Carolina was uniquely concentrated in a legislature of large property holders who set state policy and selected the men to administer it. The characteristics of South Carolina politics cemented the control of upper class planters. Elections to the state legislature – the one control the masses could exert over the government – were often uncontested and rarely allowed the "plebeian" a clear choice between two parties or policies ...

John C. Calhoun on the "concurrent majority" from his Disquisition (1850):

If the whole community had the same interests, so that the interests of each and every portion would be so affected by the action of the government, that the laws which oppressed or impoverished one portion, would necessarily oppress and impoverish all others – or the reverse – then the right of suffrage, of itself, would be all-sufficient to counteract the tendency of the government to oppression and abuse of its powers. ... But such is not the case. On the contrary, nothing is more difficult than to equalize the action of the government, in reference to the various and diversified interests of the community; and nothing more easy than to pervert its powers into instruments to aggrandize and enrich one or more interests by oppressing and impoverishing the others; and this too, under the operation of laws, couched in general terms – and which, on their face, appear fair and equal. ... Such being the case, it necessarily results, that the right of suffrage, by placing the control of the government in the community must ... lead to conflict among its different interests – each striving to obtain possession of its powers, as the means of protecting itself against the others – or of advancing its respective interests, regardless of the interests of others. For this purpose, a struggle will take place between the various interests to obtain a majority, in order to control the government. If no one interest be strong enough, of itself, to obtain it, a combination will be formed. ... [and] the community will be divided into two great parties – a major and minor – between which there will be incessant struggles on the one side to retain, and on the other to obtain the majority – and, thereby, the control of the government and the advantages it confers.

== Publication ==
The Disquisition was published in 1851, shortly after his death, as was its companion book, Discourse on the Constitution and Government of the United States.

Many Southerners believed Calhoun's warnings, contained in the Disquisition and in his many other writings and speeches, and read every political news story from the North as further evidence of the planned destruction of the Southern way of life. The climax came a decade after Calhoun's death with the election of Republican Abraham Lincoln in 1860, which led to the secession of South Carolina, followed by six other Southern states. They formed the Confederate States of America.

== Sources ==
- Bartlett, Irving (1994). John C. Calhoun: A Biography. W. W. Norton, Incorporated. ISBN 978-0-393-33286-5.
- Calhoun, John Caldwell (1851). Cralle, Richard K. (ed.). A Disquisition on Government and A Discourse on the Constitution and Government of the United States (1 ed.). Charleston, S.C.: Press of Walker & James.
- Coit, Margaret L. (1950). John C. Calhoun: American Portrait. Houghton, Mifflin. ISBN 0-87797-185-4.
- Freehling, William W. (1965). "Spoilsmen and Interests in the Thought and Career of John C. Calhoun". Journal of American History. 52 (1): 25–42. doi:10.2307/1901122. JSTOR 1901122.
- Krannawitter, Thomas L. (2008). Vindicating Lincoln: Defending the Politics of Our Greatest President. Rowman & Littlefield Publishers. ISBN 978-0-7425-5972-1.
- Perman, Michael (2012). The Southern Political Tradition. LSU Press. ISBN 978-0-8071-4468-8.
- Polin, Constance; Polin, Raymond (2006). Foundations of American Political Thought. Peter Lang. ISBN 978-0-8204-7929-3.
- Varon, Elizabeth R. (2008). Disunion!: The Coming of the American Civil War, 1789–1859. University of North Carolina Press. ISBN 978-0-8078-8718-9.
