= Liam Anderson =

Liam Anderson may refer to:

- Liam Anderson, author of academic book Crisis in Kirkuk
- Liam Anderson (American football) (born 2000), American football linebacker
