= John C. Calhoun =

Vice President of the United States from 1825 to 1832

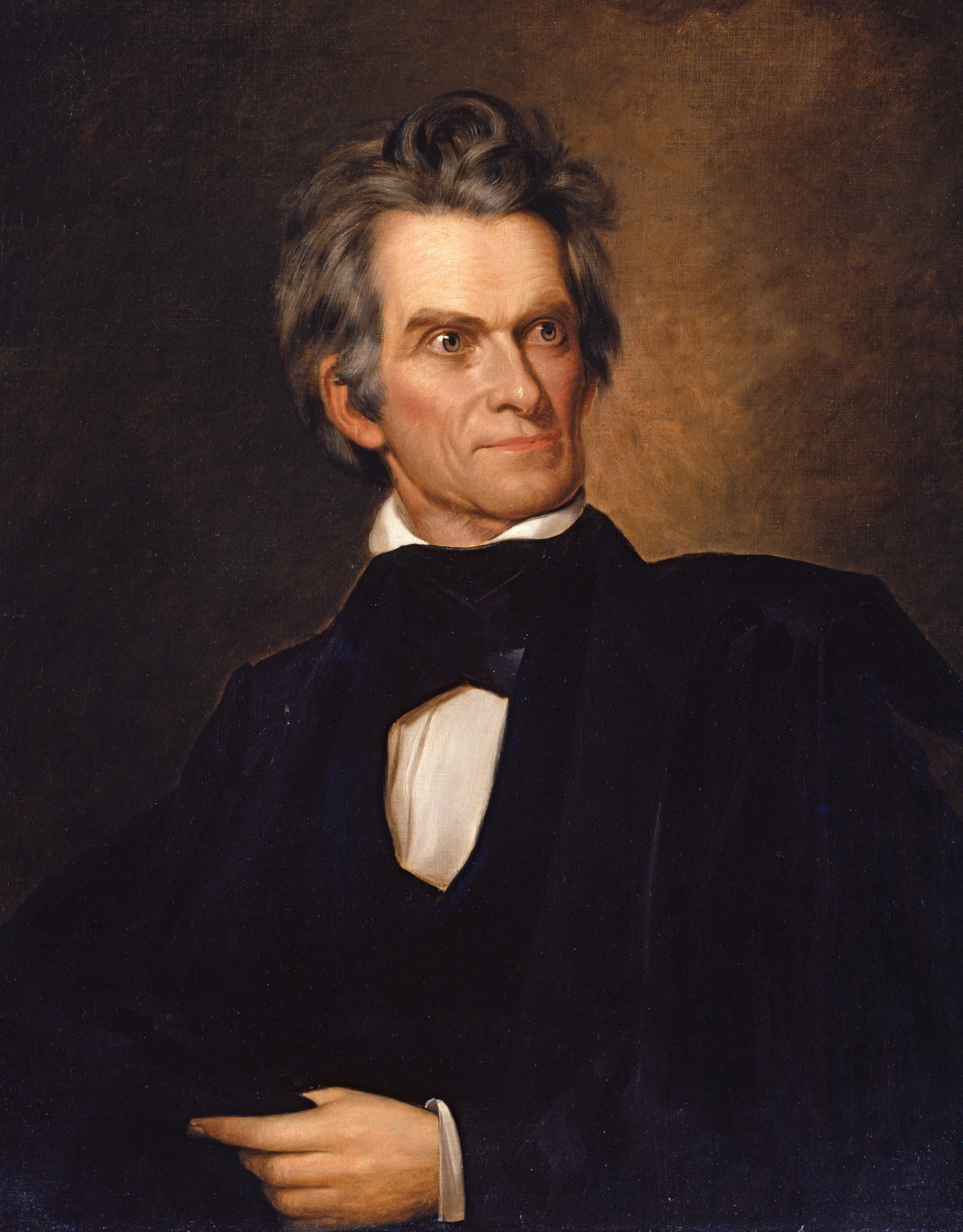
- Portrait, c. 1845

7th Vice President of the United States
- In office March 4, 1825 – December 28, 1832
- President: John Quincy Adams (1825–1829); Andrew Jackson (1829–1832)
- Preceded by: Daniel D. Tompkins
- Succeeded by: Martin Van Buren

United States Senator from South Carolina
- In office November 26, 1845 – March 31, 1850
- Preceded by: Daniel Elliott Huger
- Succeeded by: Franklin H. Elmore
- In office December 29, 1832 – March 3, 1843
- Preceded by: Robert Y. Hayne
- Succeeded by: Daniel Elliott Huger

16th United States Secretary of State
- In office April 1, 1844 – March 10, 1845
- President: John Tyler; James K. Polk
- Preceded by: Abel P. Upshur
- Succeeded by: James Buchanan

10th United States Secretary of War
- In office December 8, 1817 – March 4, 1825
- President: James Monroe
- Preceded by: William H. Crawford
- Succeeded by: James Barbour

Member of the U.S. House of Representatives from South Carolina's 6th district
- In office March 4, 1811 – November 3, 1817
- Preceded by: Joseph Calhoun
- Succeeded by: Eldred Simkins

Personal details
- Born: John Caldwell Calhoun; March 18, 1782 Abbeville, South Carolina, U.S.
- Died: March 31, 1850 (aged 68) Washington, D.C., U.S.
- Resting place: St. Philip's Church
- Party: Democratic-Republican (before 1828); Democratic (1828, 1839–1850); Nullifier (1828–1839)
- Spouse: Floride Bonneau Calhoun (m. 1811)
- Children: 10, including Anna
- Parent: Patrick Calhoun (father)
- Education: Yale College; Litchfield Law School

John Caldwell Calhoun (/kælˈhuːn/; March 18, 1782 – March 31, 1850) was an American statesman and political theorist who served as the seventh vice president of the United States from 1825 to 1832. Calhoun began his political career as a nationalist, modernizer and proponent of a strong federal government and protective tariffs. In the late 1820s, his views shifted, and he became a leading proponent of states' rights, limited government, nullification, and opposition to high tariffs, and distinguished himself as an outspoken defender of slavery in the United States. Calhoun saw Northern acceptance of those policies as a condition of the South remaining in the Union. His beliefs heavily influenced the South's secession from the Union in 1860 and 1861. Calhoun was the first of two vice presidents to resign from the position, the second being Spiro Agnew, who resigned in 1973. He resigned before the end of his term because he had major political conflicts with Andrew Jackson.

Born in South Carolina, Calhoun began his political career with election to the House of Representatives in 1810. As a prominent leader of the war hawk faction, he strongly supported the War of 1812. Calhoun served as Secretary of War under President James Monroe and, in that position, reorganized and modernized the War Department. He was a candidate for the presidency in the 1824 election. After failing to gain support, Calhoun agreed to be a candidate for vice president. The Electoral College elected him vice president by an overwhelming majority. He served under John Quincy Adams and continued under Andrew Jackson, who defeated Adams in the election of 1828, making Calhoun the most recent U.S. vice president to serve under two different presidents.

Calhoun had a difficult relationship with Jackson, primarily because of the Nullification Crisis and the Petticoat affair. In contrast with his previous nationalist sentiments, Calhoun vigorously supported South Carolina's right to nullify federal tariff legislation that he believed unfairly favored the North, which put him into conflict with Unionists such as Jackson. In 1832, with only a few months remaining in his second term, Calhoun resigned as vice president and was elected to the Senate. He sought the Democratic Party nomination for the presidency in 1844 but lost to surprise nominee James K. Polk, who won the general election. Calhoun served as Secretary of State under President John Tyler from 1844 to 1845, and in that role supported the annexation of Texas as a means to extend the Slave Power and helped to settle the Oregon boundary dispute with Britain. Calhoun returned to the Senate, where he opposed the Mexican–American War, the Wilmot Proviso and the Compromise of 1850 before he died of tuberculosis in 1850. He often served as a virtual independent who variously aligned as needed with Democrats and Whigs.

Later in life, Calhoun became known as the "cast-iron man" for his rigid defense of white Southern beliefs and practices. His concept of republicanism emphasized proslavery thought and minority states' rights as embodied by the South. He owned dozens of slaves in Fort Hill, South Carolina, and asserted that slavery, rather than being a "necessary evil", was a "positive good" that benefited both slaves and enslavers. To protect minority rights against majority rule, he called for a concurrent majority by which the minority could block some proposals that it felt infringed on their liberties. To that end, Calhoun supported states' rights, and nullification, through which states could declare null and void federal laws that they viewed as unconstitutional. He was one of the "Great Triumvirate" or the "Immortal Trio" of congressional leaders, along with his colleagues Daniel Webster and Henry Clay.

== Early life ==
John Caldwell Calhoun was born in Abbeville District, South Carolina on March 18, 1782. He was the fourth child of Irish-born Patrick Calhoun and his wife Martha Caldwell. Patrick's father, also named Patrick, joined the waves of Scotch-Irish emigration from County Donegal to southwestern Pennsylvania. After the death of the elder Patrick in 1741, the family moved to Virginia. Following the British defeat at the Battle of the Monongahela in 1755, the family, fearing Indian attacks, moved to South Carolina in 1756. Patrick, a prominent member of the tight-knit Scotch-Irish community on the frontier who worked as surveyor and farmer, was elected to the South Carolina Legislature in 1763 and acquired ownership over slave plantations. As a Presbyterian, he stood opposed to the established Anglican planter class based in Charleston. Patrick remained neutral in the American Revolution and opposed ratification of the U.S. Constitution on grounds of states' rights and personal liberties. Calhoun eventually adopted his father's beliefs on states' rights.

Young Calhoun showed scholastic talent, and although schools were scarce on the Carolina frontier, he was enrolled briefly in an academy taught by his brother-in-law Moses Waddel. It stressed the Latin and Greek classics. He continued his studies privately. When his father died, his brothers were away starting business careers, and so the 14-year-old Calhoun took over management of the family farm and five other farms. For four years he simultaneously kept up his reading and his hunting and fishing. The family decided he should continue his education, and so he resumed studies at Waddel's academy after it reopened. With financing from his brothers, he went to Yale College in Connecticut in 1802. For the first time in his life, Calhoun encountered serious, advanced, and well-organized intellectual dialogue that could shape his mind. Yale was dominated by President Timothy Dwight, a Federalist who became his mentor. Dwight's brilliance entranced (and sometimes repelled) Calhoun.

Biographer John Niven says:

Calhoun admired Dwight's extemporaneous sermons, his seemingly encyclopedic knowledge, and his awesome mastery of the classics, of the tenets of Calvinism, and of metaphysics. No one, he thought, could explicate the language of John Locke with such clarity.

Dwight repeatedly denounced Jeffersonian democracy, and Calhoun challenged him in class. Dwight could not shake Calhoun's commitment to republicanism. "Young man," retorted Dwight, "your talents are of a high order and might justify you for any station, but I deeply regret that you do not love sound principles better than sophistry—you seem to possess a most unfortunate bias for error." Dwight also expounded on the strategy of secession from the Union as a legitimate solution for New England's disagreements with the national government. Calhoun made friends easily, read widely, and was a noted member of the debating society of Brothers in Unity. He graduated as valedictorian in 1804. He studied law at the nation's first independent law school, Tapping Reeve Law School in Litchfield, Connecticut, where he worked with Tapping Reeve and James Gould. He was admitted to the South Carolina bar in 1807.

Biographer Margaret Coit argues that:

every principle of secession or states' rights which Calhoun ever voiced can be traced right back to the thinking of intellectual New England ... Not the South, not slavery, but Yale College and Litchfield Law School made Calhoun a nullifier ... Dwight, Reeve, and Gould could not convince the young patriot from South Carolina as to the desirability of secession, but they left no doubts in his mind as to its legality.

== Personal life ==
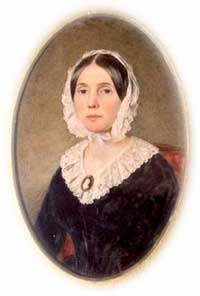
Calhoun's wife, Floride Calhoun

In January 1811, Calhoun married Floride Bonneau Colhoun, a first cousin once removed. She was the daughter of wealthy United States Senator and lawyer John E. Colhoun, a leader of Charleston high society.

The couple had ten children:

- Andrew Pickens (1811–1865)
- Floride Pure (1814–1815)
- Jane (1816–1816)
- Anna Maria (1817–1875), who married Thomas Green Clemson who later founded Clemson University in South Carolina
- Elizabeth (1819–1820)
- Patrick (1821–1858)
- John Caldwell Jr. (1823–1850)
- Martha Cornelia (1824–1857)
- James Edward (1826–1861)
- William Lowndes (1829–1858)

Calhoun was not openly religious and was generally not outspoken about his religious beliefs. He was raised as an orthodox Presbyterian, but was attracted to Southern varieties of Unitarianism like those that attracted Jefferson. Southern Unitarianism was generally less organized than the variety popular in New England. After his marriage, Calhoun and his wife attended the Episcopal Church, of which she was a member. In 1821, he became a founding member of All Souls Unitarian Church in Washington, D.C.

Historian Merrill D. Peterson describes Calhoun: "Intensely serious and severe, he could never write a love poem, though he often tried, because every line began with 'whereas' ..."

== House of Representatives ==
=== War of 1812 ===
With a base among the Irish and Scotch Irish, Calhoun won election to South Carolina's 6th congressional district of the House of Representatives in 1810, defeating John Archer Elmore. He immediately became a leader of the War Hawks, along with Speaker Henry Clay of Kentucky and South Carolina congressmen William Lowndes and Langdon Cheves. Brushing aside the vehement objections of both anti-war New Englanders and ardent Jeffersonians led by John Randolph of Roanoke, they pushed for war with Britain, claiming that America's national honor and republican values had been violated by British interference with US merchant shipping. As a member, and later acting chairman, of the Committee on Foreign Affairs, Calhoun played a major role in drafting two key documents in the push for war, the Report on Foreign Relations and the War Report of 1812. Drawing on the linguistic tradition of the Declaration of Independence, Calhoun's committee called for a declaration of war in ringing phrases, citing Britain's supposed "lust for power", "unbounded tyranny", and "mad ambition".

The United States declared war on Britain on June 18, inaugurating the War of 1812. The opening phase involved multiple disasters for American forces, as well as a financial crisis when the Treasury could barely pay the bills. The conflict caused economic hardship for Americans, as the Royal Navy blockaded American ports and cut off imports, exports, and the coastal trade. Several American invasions of Canada were fiascos, but the U.S. seized control of Lake Erie in 1813 and broke the power of hostile Indians in battles such as the 1813 Battle of the Thames in Canada and the 1814 Battle of Horseshoe Bend in Alabama. These Indians had, in many cases, cooperated with the British or Spanish in opposing American interests.

Calhoun labored to raise troops, provide funds, speed logistics, rescue the currency, and regulate commerce to aid the war effort. One colleague hailed him as "the young Hercules who carried the war on his shoulders". American military disasters made him double his legislative efforts to overcome the obstructionism of John Randolph, Daniel Webster, and other opponents of the war. In 1814, the British were thwarted in their invasions of New York and Baltimore, but Napoleon capitulated, meaning America would now face formidable British reinforcements consisting of units previously committed to Europe if the war were to continue. British and American diplomats signed the Treaty of Ghent undertaking a return to the borders of 1812 with no gains or losses. Before the treaty reached the Senate for ratification, and even before news of its signing reached New Orleans, a British invasion force was decisively defeated in January 1815 at the Battle of New Orleans, making a national hero of General Andrew Jackson. Americans celebrated what they called a "second war of independence" against Britain. This led to the beginning of the "Era of Good Feelings", an era marked by the formal demise of the Federalist Party and increased nationalism.

=== Postwar planning ===
Despite American successes, the mismanagement of the Army during the war very much distressed Calhoun, and he resolved to strengthen and centralize the War Department. The militia had proven itself quite unreliable during the war and Calhoun saw the need for a permanent and professional military force. In 1816 he called for building an effective navy, including steam frigates, as well as a standing army of adequate size. The British blockade of the coast had underscored the necessity of rapid means of internal transportation; Calhoun proposed a system of "great permanent roads". The blockade had cut off the import of manufactured items, so he emphasized the need to encourage more domestic manufacture, fully realizing that industry was based in the Northeast. The dependence of the old financial system on import duties was devastated when the blockade cut off imports. Calhoun called for a system of internal taxation that would not collapse from a war-time shrinkage of maritime trade, as the tariffs had done. The expiration of the charter of the First Bank of the United States had also distressed the Treasury, so to reinvigorate and modernize the economy Calhoun called for a new national bank. A new bank was chartered as the Second Bank of the United States by Congress and approved by President James Madison in 1816. Through his proposals, Calhoun emphasized a national footing and downplayed sectionalism and states rights. Historian Ulrich B. Phillips says that at this stage of Calhoun's career, "The word nation was often on his lips, and his conviction was to enhance national unity which he identified with national power."

=== Rhetorical style ===
Regarding his career in the House of Representatives, an observer commented that Calhoun was "the most elegant speaker that sits in the House .... His gestures are easy and graceful, his manner forcible, and language elegant; but above all, he confines himself closely to the subject, which he always understands, and enlightens everyone within hearing."

His talent for public speaking required systematic self-discipline and practice. A later critic noted the sharp contrast between his hesitant conversations and his fluent speaking styles, adding that Calhoun "had so carefully cultivated his naturally poor voice as to make his utterance clear, full, and distinct in speaking and while not at all musical it yet fell pleasantly on the ear". Calhoun was "a high-strung man of ultra intellectual cast". As such, Calhoun was not known for charisma. He was often seen as harsh and aggressive with other representatives. But he was a brilliant intellectual orator and strong organizer. Historian Russell Kirk says, "That zeal which flared like Greek fire in Randolph burned in Calhoun, too; but it was contained in the Cast-iron Man as in a furnace, and Calhoun's passion glowed out only through his eyes. No man was more stately, more reserved."

John Quincy Adams concluded in 1821 that "Calhoun is a man of fair and candid mind, of honorable principles, of clear and quick understanding, of cool self-possession, of enlarged philosophical views, and ardent patriotism. He is above all sectional and factious prejudices more than any other statesman of this Union with whom I have ever acted." Historian Charles Wiltse noted Calhoun's evolution, "Though he is known today primarily for his sectionalism, Calhoun was the last of the great political leaders of his time to take a sectional position—later than Daniel Webster, later than Henry Clay, later than Adams himself."

== Secretary of War and postwar nationalism ==
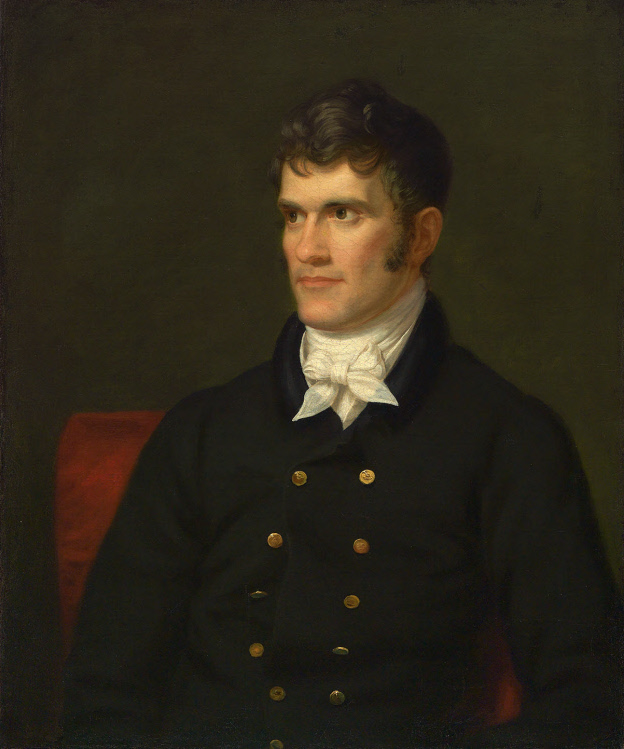
Charles Bird King's 1822 portrait of Calhoun at the age of 40

In 1817, the deplorable state of the War Department led four men to decline offers from President James Monroe to accept the office of Secretary of War before Calhoun finally assumed the role. Calhoun took office on December 8 and served until 1825. He continued his role as a leading nationalist during the Era of Good Feelings. He proposed an elaborate program of national reforms to the infrastructure that he believed would speed up economic modernization. His priority was an effective navy, including steam frigates, and in the second place a standing army of adequate size—and as further preparation for an emergency, "great permanent roads", "a certain encouragement" to manufacturers, and a system of internal taxation that would not collapse from a war-time shrinkage of maritime trade, like customs duties.

A reform-minded modernizer, Calhoun attempted to institute centralization and efficiency in the Indian Department and in the Army by establishing new coastal and frontier fortifications and building military roads, but Congress either failed to respond to his reforms or responded with hostility. Calhoun's frustration with congressional inaction, political rivalries, and ideological differences spurred him to create the Bureau of Indian Affairs in 1824. Thomas McKenney was appointed as its first head.

As secretary, Calhoun had responsibility for the management of Indian affairs. He promoted a plan, adopted by Monroe in 1825, to preserve the sovereignty of eastern Indians by relocating them to western reservations they could control without interference from state governments. In over seven years Calhoun supervised the negotiation and ratification of 40 treaties with Indian tribes. Calhoun opposed the invasion of Spanish Florida launched in 1818 by General Jackson during the First Seminole War, which was done without direct authorization from Calhoun or President Monroe, and in private with other cabinet members, advocated censuring of Jackson as punishment. Calhoun claimed that Jackson had begun a war against Spain in violation of the Constitution and, that he had contradicted Calhoun's explicit orders in doing so. Specific official instructions not to invade Florida or attack the Spanish were not issued by the administration. However, Calhoun supported the execution of Alexander Arbuthnot and Robert Ambrister, two British subjects living in Florida who had been accused by American officials of inciting the Seminole to war against the United States. Calhoun accused the British of being involved in "wickedness, corruption, and barbarity at which the heart sickens and which in this enlightened age it ought not scarcely to be believed that a Christian nation would have participated". He added that he hoped the executions of Arbuthnot and Ambrister would deter the British and any other nations "who by false promises delude and excite an Indian tribe to all the deeds of savage war". The United States annexed Florida from Spain in 1819 through the Adams–Onís Treaty.

Calhoun's tenure as Secretary of War witnessed the outbreak of the Missouri crisis in December 1818, when a petition arrived from Missouri settlers seeking admission into the Union as a slave state. In response, Representative James Tallmadge Jr. of New York proposed two amendments to the bill designed to restrict the spread of slavery into what would become the new state. These amendments touched off an intense debate between North and South that had some talking openly of disunion. In February 1820, Calhoun predicted to Secretary of State John Quincy Adams, a New Englander, that the Missouri issue "would not produce a dissolution" of the Union. "But if it should," Calhoun went on, "the South would of necessity be compelled to form an alliance with ... Great Britain." "I said that would be returning to the colonial state," Adams recalled saying afterward. According to Adams, "He said, yes, pretty much, but it would be forced upon them."

After the war ended in 1815 the "Old Republicans" in Congress, with their Jeffersonian ideology for an economy in the federal government, sought to reduce the operations and finances of the War Department. Calhoun's political rivalry with William H. Crawford, the Secretary of the Treasury, over the pursuit of the presidency in the 1824 election, complicated Calhoun's tenure as War Secretary. The general lack of military action following the war meant that a large army, such as that preferred by Calhoun, was no longer considered necessary. The "Radicals", a group of strong states' rights supporters who mostly favored Crawford for president in the coming election, were inherently suspicious of large armies. Some allegedly also wanted to hinder Calhoun's presidential aspirations for that election. Thus, on March 2, 1821, Congress passed the Reduction Act, which reduced the number of enlisted men of the army by half, from 11,709 to 5,586, and the number of the officer corps by a fifth, from 680 to 540. Calhoun, though concerned, offered little protest. Later, to provide the army with a more organized command structure, which had been severely lacking during the War of 1812, he appointed Major General Jacob Brown to a position that would later become known as "Commanding General of the United States Army".

== Vice presidency (1825–1832) ==
=== 1824 and 1828 elections and Adams presidency ===
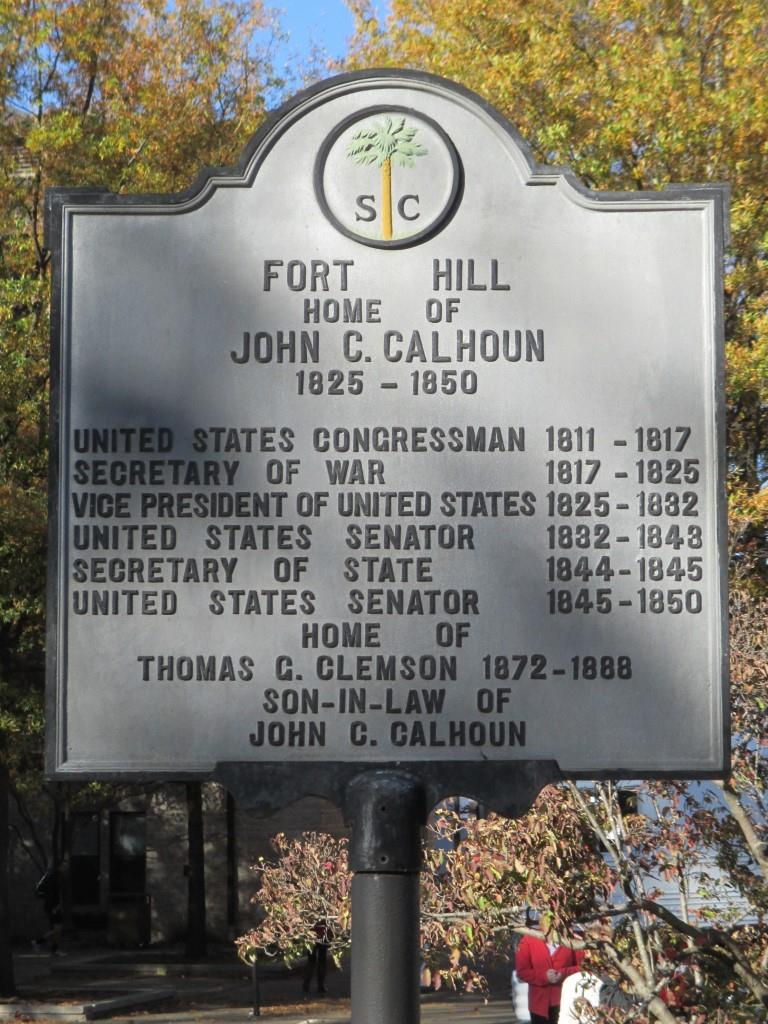
State historic marker at Fort Hill, Calhoun's home from 1825 until his death in 1850

Calhoun was initially a candidate for President of the United States in the election of 1824. Four other men also sought the presidency: Andrew Jackson, Adams, Crawford, and Henry Clay. Calhoun sought to appeal to the south and also to rely on his support in Pennsylvania. Calhoun failed to win the endorsement of the South Carolina legislature, and his supporters in Pennsylvania decided to abandon his candidacy in favor of Jackson's, and instead supported him for vice president. Other states soon followed, and Calhoun therefore allowed himself to become a candidate for vice president rather than president. Both Jackson and Adams supporters backed Calhoun for vice president, making him effectively the runningmate of both candidates. The Electoral College elected Calhoun vice president by a landslide on December 1, 1824. He won 182 of 261 electoral votes, while five other men received the remaining votes. No presidential candidate received a majority in the Electoral College, and the election was ultimately resolved by the House of Representatives, where Adams was declared the winner over Crawford and Jackson, who in the election had led Adams in both popular vote and electoral vote. After Clay, the Speaker of the House, was appointed Secretary of State by Adams, Jackson's supporters denounced what they considered a "corrupt bargain" between Adams and Clay to give Adams the presidency in exchange for Clay receiving the office of Secretary of State, the holder of which had traditionally become the next president. Calhoun also expressed some concerns, which caused friction between him and Adams.

Calhoun also opposed President Adams's plan to send a delegation to observe a meeting of South and Central American leaders in Panama, believing that the United States should stay out of foreign affairs. Calhoun became disillusioned with Adams's high tariff policies and increased centralization of government through a network of "internal improvements", which he now saw as a threat to the rights of the states. Calhoun wrote to Jackson on June 4, 1826, informing him that he would support Jackson's second campaign for the presidency in 1828. The two were never particularly close friends. Calhoun never fully trusted Jackson, a frontiersman and popular war hero, but hoped that his election would bring some reprieve from Adams's anti-states' rights policies. Jackson selected Calhoun as his running mate, and together they defeated Adams and his running mate Richard Rush. Calhoun thus became the second of two vice presidents to serve under two different presidents. The only other man who accomplished this feat was George Clinton, who served as vice president from 1805 to 1812 under Thomas Jefferson and James Madison.

During the election, Jackson's aide James Alexander Hamilton attempted a rapprochement between Jackson and Crawford, whom Jackson resented owing partially to the belief that it was he, not Calhoun, who had opposed the invasion of Florida. Hamilton spoke about this prospect with Governor John Forsyth of Georgia, who acted as a mediator between the Jackson campaign and Crawford. Forsyth wrote a letter back to Hamilton in which he claimed that Crawford had stated to him that it was Calhoun, not Crawford, who had supported censuring Jackson for his invasion of Florida. Knowing that the letter could destroy the partnership between Jackson and Calhoun, Hamilton and fellow Jackson aide William B. Lewis allowed it to remain in Hamilton's possession without informing Jackson or the public of its existence.

=== Petticoat affair ===
Early in Jackson's administration, Calhoun's wife Floride Bonneau Calhoun organized Cabinet wives (hence the term "petticoats") against Peggy Eaton, wife of Secretary of War John Eaton, and refused to associate with her. They alleged that John and Peggy Eaton had engaged in an adulterous affair while she was still legally married to her first husband, and that her recent behavior was unladylike. The allegations of scandal created an intolerable situation for Jackson. The Petticoat affair ended friendly relations between Calhoun and Jackson.

Jackson sided with the Eatons. He and his late wife Rachel Donelson had undergone similar political attacks stemming from their marriage in 1791. The two had married in 1791 not knowing that Rachel's first husband, Lewis Robards, had failed to finalize the expected divorce. Once the divorce was finalized, they married legally in 1794, but the episode caused a major controversy, and was used against him in the 1828 campaign. Jackson saw attacks on Eaton stemming ultimately from the political opposition of Calhoun, who had failed to silence his wife's criticisms. The Calhouns were widely regarded as the chief instigators. Jackson, who loved to personalize disputes, also saw the Petticoat affair as a direct challenge to his authority, because it involved lower-ranking executive officials and their wives seeming to contest his ability to choose whomever he wanted for his cabinet. Secretary of State Martin Van Buren, a widower, took Jackson's side and defended the Eatons. Van Buren was a northerner and a supporter of the 1828 tariff (which Calhoun bitterly opposed). Calhoun and Van Buren were the main contenders for the vice-presidential nomination in the ensuing election, and the nominee would then presumably be the party's choice to succeed Jackson. That Van Buren sided with the Eatons, in addition to disagreements between Jackson and Calhoun on other issues, mainly the Nullification Crisis, marked him as Calhoun's likely vice presidential successor.

Some historians, including Jackson biographers Richard B. Latner and Robert V. Remini, believe that the hostility towards the Eatons was rooted less in questions of proper behavior than in politics. Eaton had been in favor of the Tariff of Abominations. He was also politically close to Van Buren. Calhoun may have wanted to expel Eaton from the cabinet as a way of boosting his anti-tariff agenda and increasing his standing in the Democratic Party. Many cabinet members were Southern and could be expected to sympathize with such concerns, especially Treasury Secretary Samuel D. Ingham, who was allied with Calhoun and believed that he, not Van Buren, should succeed Jackson as president.

In 1830, reports had emerged accurately stating that Calhoun, as Secretary of War, had favored censuring Jackson for his 1818 invasion of Florida. These infuriated Jackson. Eventually, Lewis decided to reveal the existence of Forsyth's letter, and on April 30, Crawford wrote a second letter, this time to Forsyth, repeating the charge Forsyth represented him as having previously made. Jackson received the letter on May 12, which confirmed his suspicions. He claimed that Calhoun had "betrayed" him. Eaton took his revenge on Calhoun. For reasons unclear, Calhoun asked Eaton to approach Jackson about the possibility of Calhoun publishing his correspondence with Jackson at the time of the Seminole War. Eaton did nothing, leading Calhoun to believe that Jackson had approved the publication of the letters. Calhoun published them in the United States Telegraph, a newspaper edited by a Calhoun protégé, Duff Green. This gave the appearance of Calhoun trying to justify himself against a conspiracy to damage him and further enraged the President.

Finally in the spring of 1831, at the suggestion of Van Buren, who, like Jackson, supported the Eatons, Jackson replaced all but one of his Cabinet members, thereby limiting Calhoun's influence. Van Buren began the process by resigning as Secretary of State, facilitating Jackson's removal of others. Van Buren thereby grew in favor with Jackson, while the rift between the President and Calhoun was widened. Later, in 1832, Calhoun, as vice president, cast a tie-breaking vote against Jackson's nomination of Van Buren as Minister to Great Britain in a failed attempt to end Van Buren's political career. Missouri Senator Thomas Hart Benton, a staunch supporter of Jackson, then stated that Calhoun had "elected a Vice President", as Van Buren was able to move past his failed nomination as Minister to Great Britain and instead gain the Democratic Party's vice-presidential nomination in the 1832 election, in which he and Jackson were victorious.

=== Nullification ===
Calhoun had begun to oppose increases in protective tariffs, as they generally benefited Northerners more than Southerners. While he was vice president in the Adams administration, Jackson's supporters devised a high tariff legislation that placed duties on imports that were also made in New England. Calhoun had been assured that the northeastern interests would reject the Tariff of 1828, exposing pro-Adams New England congressmen to charges that they selfishly opposed legislation popular among Jacksonian Democrats in the west and mid-Atlantic States. The Southern legislators miscalculated and the so-called "Tariff of Abominations" passed and was signed into law by President Adams. Frustrated, Calhoun returned to his South Carolina plantation, where he anonymously composed South Carolina Exposition and Protest, an essay rejecting the centralization philosophy and supporting the principle of nullification as a means to prevent a tyranny of a central government.

Calhoun supported the idea of nullification through a concurrent majority. Nullification is a legal theory that a state has the right to nullify, or invalidate, any federal law it deems unconstitutional. In Calhoun's words, it is "the right of a State to interpose, in the last resort, in order to arrest an unconstitutional act of the General Government, within its limits". Nullification can be traced back to arguments by Jefferson and Madison in writing the Kentucky and Virginia Resolutions of 1798 against the Alien and Sedition Acts. Madison expressed the hope that the states would declare the acts unconstitutional, while Jefferson explicitly endorsed nullification. Calhoun openly argued for a state's right to secede from the Union, as a last resort to protect its liberty and sovereignty. In his later years, Madison rebuked supporters of nullification, stating that no state had the right to nullify federal law.

In "South Carolina Exposition and Protest", Calhoun argued that a state could veto any federal law that went beyond the enumerated powers and encroached upon the residual powers of the State. President Jackson, meanwhile, generally supported states' rights, but opposed nullification and secession. At the 1830 Jefferson Day dinner at Jesse Brown's Indian Queen Hotel, Jackson proposed a toast and proclaimed, "Our federal Union, it must be preserved." Calhoun replied, "The Union, next to our liberty, the most dear. May we all remember that it can only be preserved by respecting the rights of the states, and distributing equally the benefit and burden of the Union." Calhoun's publication of letters from the Seminole War in the Telegraph caused his relationship with Jackson to deteriorate further, thus contributing to the nullification crisis. Jackson and Calhoun began an angry correspondence that lasted until Jackson stopped it in July.

Jackson supported a revision to tariff rates known as the Tariff of 1832. It was designed to placate the nullifiers by lowering tariff rates. Written by Treasury Secretary Louis McLane, the bill lowered duties from 45% to 27%. In May, Representative John Quincy Adams introduced a slightly revised version of the bill, which Jackson accepted. It passed Congress on July 9 and was signed by the president on July 14. The bill failed to satisfy extremists on either side. In October, the South Carolina legislature voted to call a convention to nullify the tariffs. On November 24, the South Carolina Nullification Convention passed an ordinance nullifying both the Tariff of 1832 and the Tariff of 1828 and threatening to secede if the federal government attempted to enforce the tariffs. In response, Jackson sent U.S. Navy warships to Charleston harbor, and threatened to hang Calhoun or any man who worked to support nullification or secession. After joining the Senate, Calhoun began to work with Clay on a new compromise tariff. A bill sponsored by the administration had been introduced by Representative Gulian C. Verplanck of New York, but it lowered rates more sharply than Clay and other protectionists desired. Clay managed to get Calhoun to agree to a bill with higher rates in exchange for Clay's opposition to Jackson's military threats and, perhaps, with the hope that he could win some Southern votes in his next bid for the presidency. On the same day, Congress passed the Force Bill, which empowered the President of the United States to use military force to ensure state compliance with federal law. South Carolina accepted the tariff, but in a final show of defiance, nullified the Force Bill. In Calhoun's speech against the Force Bill, delivered on February 15, 1833, no longer as vice president, he strongly endorsed nullification, at one point saying:

Why, then, confer on the President the extensive and unlimited powers provided in this bill? Why authorize him to use military force to arrest the civil process of the State? But one answer can be given: That, in a contest between the State and the General Government, if the resistance be limited on both sides to the civil process, the State, by its inherent sovereignty, standing upon its reserved powers, will prove too powerful in such a controversy, and must triumph over the Federal Government, sustained by its delegated and limited authority; and in this answer we have an acknowledgment of the truth of those great principles for which the State has so firmly and nobly contended.

In his three-volume biography of Jackson, James Parton summed up Calhoun's role in the Nullification crisis: "Calhoun began it. Calhoun continued it. Calhoun stopped it."

=== Resignation ===
As tensions over nullification escalated, South Carolina Senator Robert Y. Hayne was considered less capable than Calhoun to represent South Carolina in the Senate debates, so in late 1832, Hayne resigned to become governor.

On December 28, 1832, John C. Calhoun wrote a letter to Secretary of State Edward Livingston (addressing him mistakenly as "H" Livingston), in which he informed him that, "Having concluded to accept of a seat in the Senate to which I have been elected by the legislature of this state [South Carolina], I herewith resign the office of vice-president of the United States."

The South Carolina legislature then elected Calhoun to fill Hayne's Senate seat. Van Buren had already been elected as Jackson's new vice president, meaning that Calhoun had less than three months left on his term anyway. The South Carolina newspaper City Gazette commented on the change:

It is admitted that the former gentleman [Hayne] is injudiciously pitted against Clay and Webster and, nullification out of the question, Mr. Calhoun's place should be in front with these formidable politicians.

Biographer John Niven argues "that these moves were part of a well-thought-out plan whereby Hayne would restrain the hotheads in the state legislature and Calhoun would defend his brainchild, nullification, in Washington against administration stalwarts and the likes of Daniel Webster, the new apostle of northern nationalism." As vice president, Calhoun cast a then-record 31 tie-breaking votes in the Senate, the most of any vice president in their capacity as Senate president until vice president Kamala Harris surpassed it in 2023.

== First term in the U.S. Senate ==
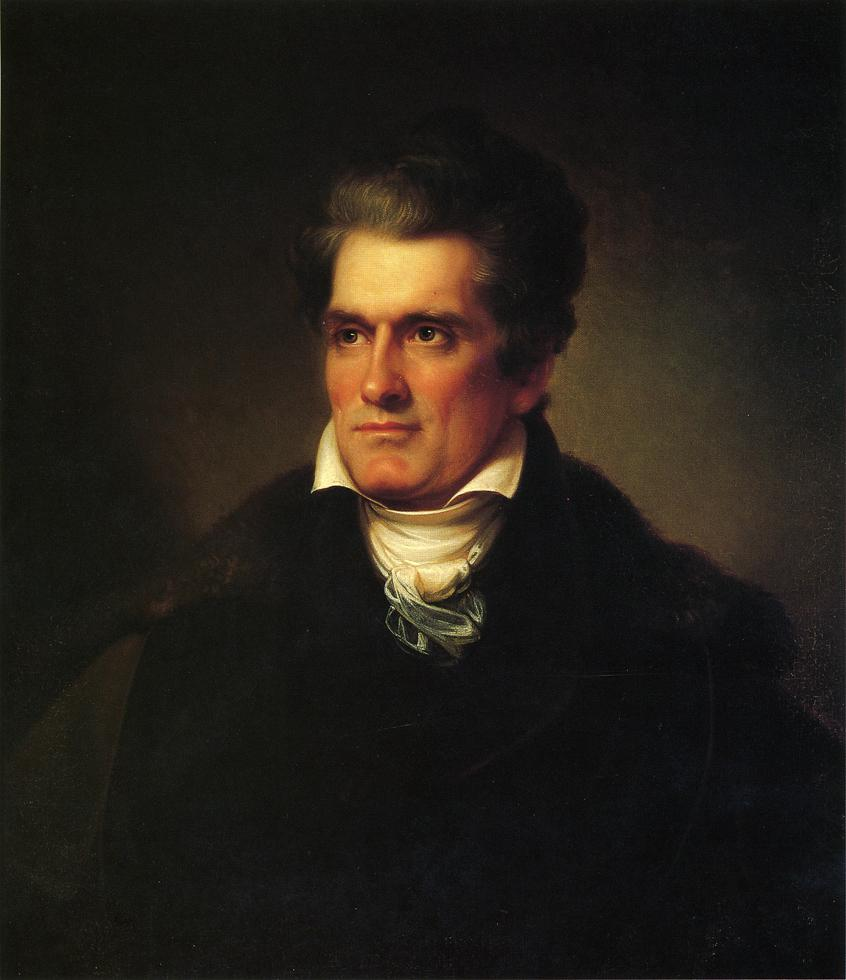
A portrait of Calhoun from 1834 by Rembrandt Peale

When Calhoun took his seat in the Senate on December 29, 1832, his chances of becoming president were considered poor due to his involvement in the Nullification Crisis, which left him without connections to a major national party. After the implementation of the Compromise Tariff of 1833, which helped solve the Nullification Crisis, the Nullifier Party, along with other anti-Jackson politicians, formed a coalition known as the Whig Party. Calhoun sometimes affiliated with the Whigs, but chose to remain a virtual independent due to the Whig promotion of federally subsidized "internal improvements".

From 1833 to 1834, Jackson was engaged in removing federal funds from the Second Bank of the United States during the Bank War. Calhoun opposed this action, considering it a dangerous expansion of executive power. He called the men of the Jackson administration "artful, cunning, and corrupt politicians, and not fearless warriors". He accused Jackson of being ignorant about financial matters. As evidence, he cited the economic panic caused by Nicholas Biddle as a means to stop Jackson from destroying the Bank. On March 28, 1834, Calhoun voted with the Whig senators on a successful motion to censure Jackson for his removal of the funds. In 1837, he refused to attend the inauguration of Jackson's chosen successor, Van Buren, even as other powerful senators who opposed the administration, such as Webster and Clay, did witness the inauguration. However, by 1837, Calhoun generally had realigned himself with most of the Democrats' policies.

To restore his national stature, Calhoun cooperated with Van Buren. Democrats were hostile to national banks, and the country's bankers had joined the Whig Party. The Democratic replacement, meant to help combat the Panic of 1837, was the Independent Treasury system, which Calhoun supported and which went into effect. Calhoun, like Jackson and Van Buren, attacked finance capitalism and opposed what he saw as encroachment by government and big business. For this reason, he opposed the candidacy of Whig William Henry Harrison in the 1840 presidential election, believing that Harrison would institute high tariffs and therefore place an undue burden on the Southern economy. Calhoun resigned from the Senate on March 3, 1843, four years before the expiration of his term, and returned to Fort Hill to prepare an attempt to win the Democratic nomination for the 1844 presidential election. He gained little support, even from the South, and quit.

== Secretary of State ==
=== Appointment and the Annexation of Texas ===
When Harrison died in 1841 after a month in office, Vice President John Tyler succeeded him. Tyler, a former Democrat, was expelled from the Whig Party after vetoing bills passed by the Whig congressional majority to reestablish a national bank and raise tariffs. He named Calhoun Secretary of State on April 10, 1844, following the death of Abel P. Upshur, one of six people killed when a cannon exploded during a public demonstration in the USS Princeton disaster.

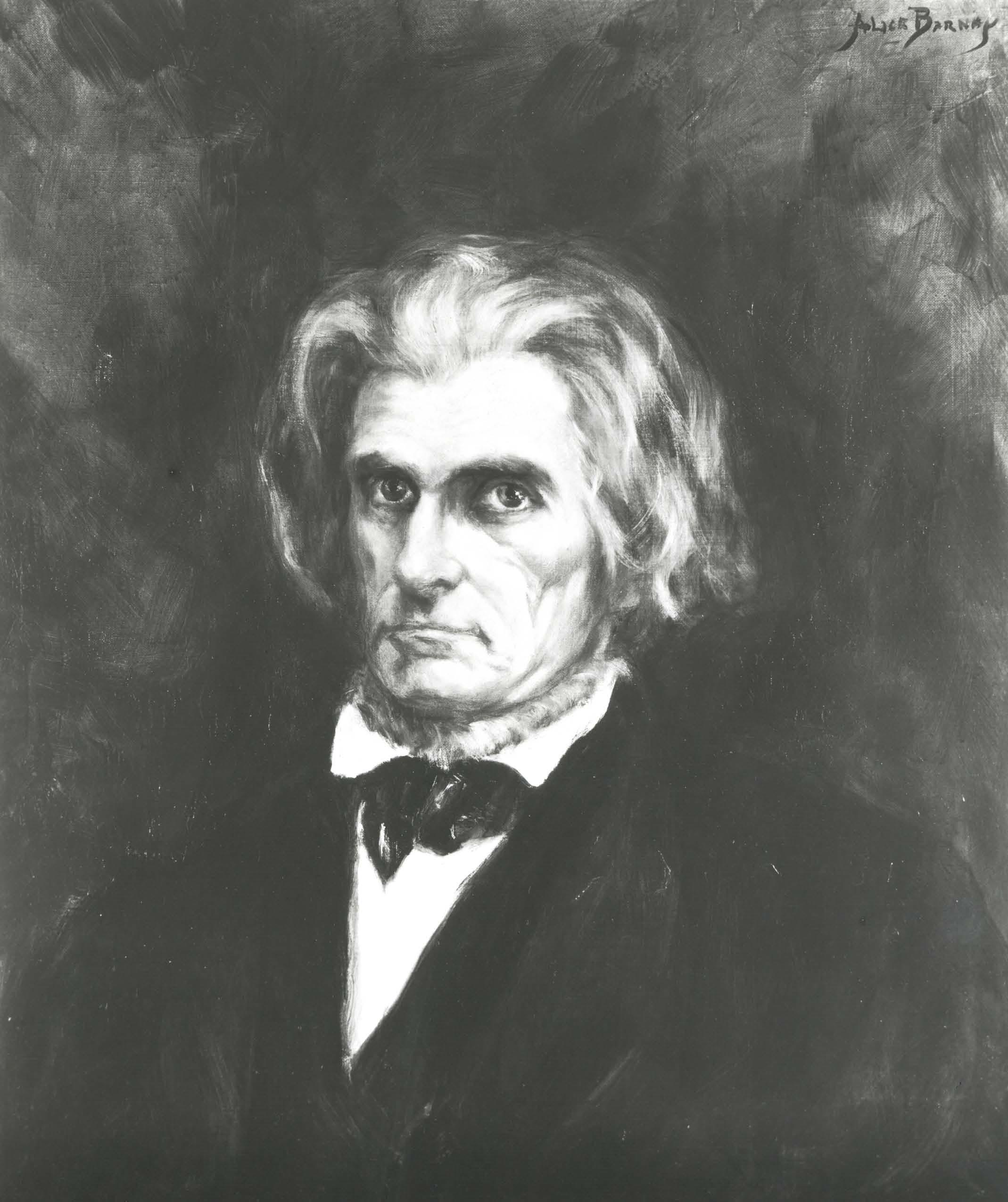
Calhoun, during his tenure as Secretary of State (April 1844 – March 1845)

Upshur's loss was a severe blow to the Tyler administration. When Calhoun was nominated as Upshur's replacement, the White House was well-advanced towards securing a treaty of annexation with Texas. The State Department's secret negotiations with the Texas republic had proceeded despite explicit threats from a suspicious Mexican government that an unauthorized seizure of its northern district of Coahuila y Tejas would be equivalent to an act of war. Both the negotiations with Texas envoys and the garnering of support from the U.S. Senate had been spearheaded aggressively by Secretary Upshur, a strong pro-slavery partisan. Tyler looked to its ratification by the Senate as the sine qua non to his ambition for another term in office. Tyler planned to outflank the Whigs by gaining support from the Democratic Party or possibly creating a new party of discontented Northern Democrats and Southern Whigs.

Calhoun, though as avid a proponent for Texas acquisition as Upshur, posed a political liability to Tyler's aims. As secretary of state, Calhoun's political objective was to see that the presidency was placed in the hands of a southern extremist, who would put the expansion of slavery at the center of national policy.

Tyler and his allies had, since 1843, devised and encouraged national propaganda promoting Texas annexation, which understated Southern slaveholders' aspirations regarding the future of Texas. Instead, Tyler chose to portray the annexation of Texas as something that would prove economically beneficial to the nation as a whole. The further introduction of slavery into the vast expanses of Texas and beyond, they argued, would "diffuse" rather than concentrate slavery regionally, ultimately weakening white attachment and dependence on slave labor. This theory was yoked to the growing enthusiasm among Americans for Manifest Destiny, a desire to see the social, economic and moral precepts of republicanism spread across the continent. Moreover, Tyler declared that national security was at stake: If foreign powers—Great Britain in particular—were to gain influence in Texas, it would be reduced to a British cotton-producing reserve and a base to exert geostrategic influence over North America. Texas might be coerced into relinquishing slavery, inducing slave uprisings in adjoining slave states and deepening sectional conflicts between American free-soil and slave-soil interests. The appointment of Calhoun, with his southern states' rights reputation—which some believed was "synonymous with slavery"—threatened to cast doubt on Tyler's carefully crafted reputation as a nationalist. Tyler, though ambivalent, felt obliged to enlist Calhoun as Secretary of State, because Tyler's closest confidantes had, in haste, offered the position to the South Carolinian statesman in the immediate aftermath of the Princeton disaster. Calhoun would be confirmed by the Senate by unanimous vote.

In advance of Calhoun's arrival in Washington, D.C., Tyler attempted to quickly finalize the treaty negotiations. Sam Houston, President of the Texas Republic, fearing Mexican retaliation, insisted on a tangible demonstration of U.S. commitments to the security of Texas. When key Texas diplomats failed to appear on schedule, the delay compelled Tyler to bring his new Secretary of State directly into negotiations. Secretary Calhoun was directed to honor former Secretary Upshur's verbal assurances of protection now offered by Calhoun in writing, to provide for U.S. military intervention in the event that Mexico used force to hold Texas. Tyler deployed U.S. Navy vessels to the Gulf of Mexico and ordered army units mobilized, entirely paid for with $100,000 of executive branch contingency funds. The move side-stepped constitutional requirements that Congress authorize appropriations for war.

On April 22, 1844, Secretary Calhoun signed the treaty of annexation and ten days later delivered it to the Senate for consideration in secret session. The details of the treaty negotiations and supporting documents were leaked to the press by Senator Benjamin Tappan of Ohio. Tappan, a Democrat, was an opponent of annexation and of slavery. The terms of the Tyler–Texas treaty and the release of Calhoun's letter to British ambassador Richard Pakenham exposed the annexation campaign as a program to expand and preserve slavery. In the Pakenham letter, Calhoun alleged that the institution of slavery contributed to the physical and mental well-being of Southern slaves. The U.S. Senate was compelled to open its debates on ratification to public scrutiny, and hopes for its passage by the two-thirds majority required by the Constitution were abandoned by administration supporters. In linking Texas annexation to the expansion of slavery, Calhoun had alienated many who might previously have supported the treaty.

On June 8, 1844, after fierce partisan struggles, the Senate rejected the Tyler–Texas treaty by a vote of 16–35, a margin of more than two-to-one. The vote went largely along party lines: Whigs had opposed it almost unanimously (1–27), while Democrats split, but voted largely in favor (15–8). Nevertheless, the disclosure of the treaty placed the issue of Texas annexation at the center of the 1844 general election.

=== Election of 1844 ===
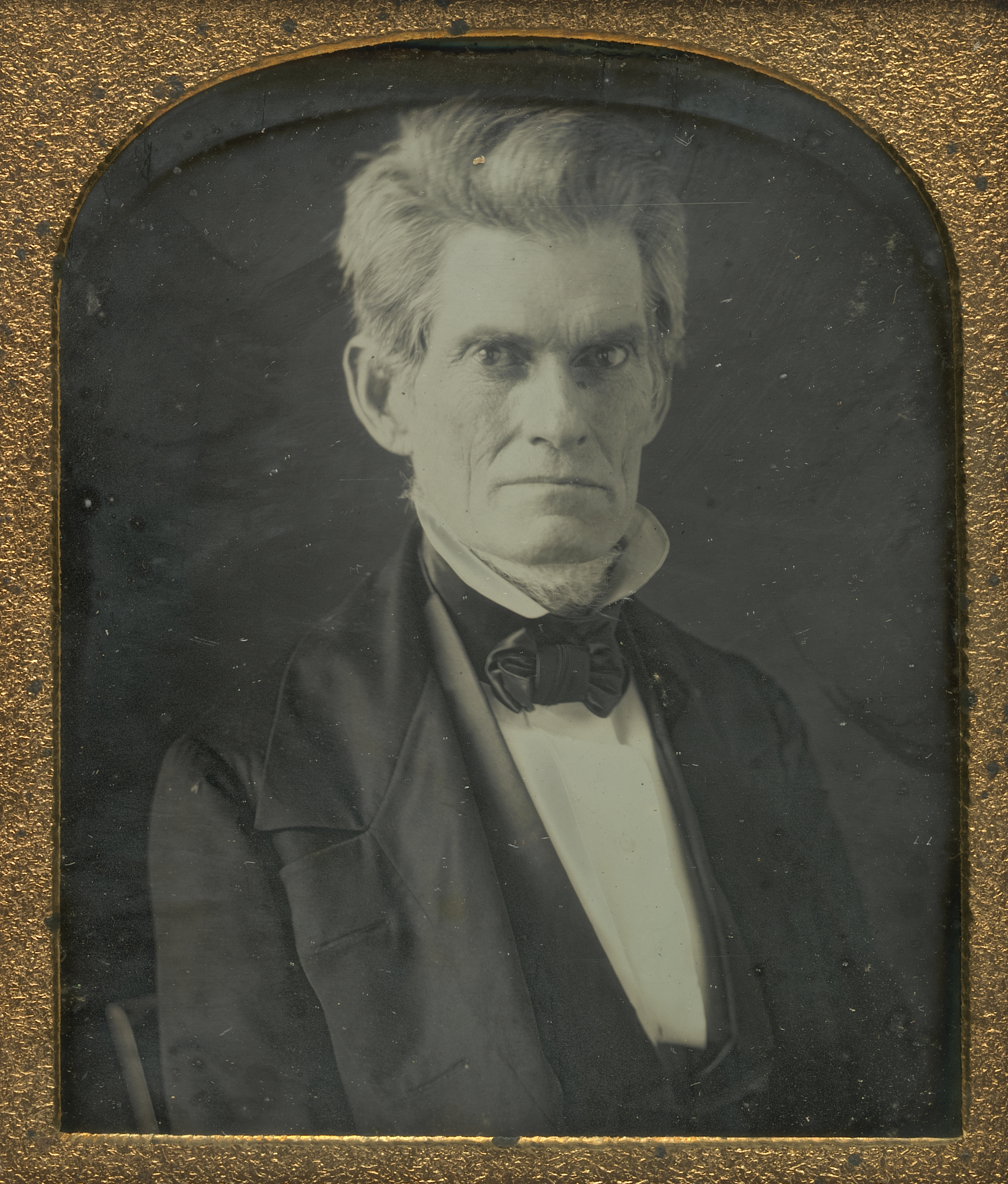
Daguerreotype of Calhoun, c. 1843

At the Democratic Convention in Baltimore, Maryland, in May 1844, Calhoun's supporters, with Calhoun in attendance, threatened to bolt the proceedings and shift support to Tyler's third party ticket if the delegates failed to produce a pro-Texas nominee. Calhoun's Pakenham letter, and its identification with proslavery extremism, moved the presumptive Democratic Party nominee, the northerner Martin Van Buren, into denouncing annexation. Therefore, Van Buren, already not widely popular in the South, saw his support from that region crippled. As a result, James K. Polk, a pro-Texas Jacksonian and Tennessee politician, won the nomination. Historian Daniel Walker Howe says that Calhoun's Pakenham letter was a deliberate attempt to influence the outcome of the 1844 election, writing:

By identifying Texas with slavery, Calhoun made sure that Van Buren, being a northerner, would have to oppose Texas. This, Calhoun correctly foresaw, would hurt the New Yorker's chances for the Democratic nomination. Nor did the Carolinian's ingenious strategy ultimately wreck the cause for Texas annexation. Indeed, in that respect it would turn out a brilliant success.

In the general election, Calhoun offered his endorsement to Polk on condition that he support the annexation of Texas, oppose the Tariff of 1842, and dissolve the Washington Globe, the semi-official propaganda organ of the Democratic Party headed by Francis Preston Blair. He received these assurances and enthusiastically supported Polk's candidacy. Polk narrowly defeated Henry Clay, who opposed annexation. Lame-duck President Tyler organized a joint House–Senate vote on the Texas treaty which passed, requiring only a simple majority. He signed a bill of annexation on March 1, 1845. With President Polk's support, the Texas annexation treaty was approved by the Texas Republic in October. A bill to admit Texas as the 28th state of the Union was signed by Polk on December 29, 1845.

== Second term in the Senate ==
=== Mexican–American War and Wilmot Proviso ===
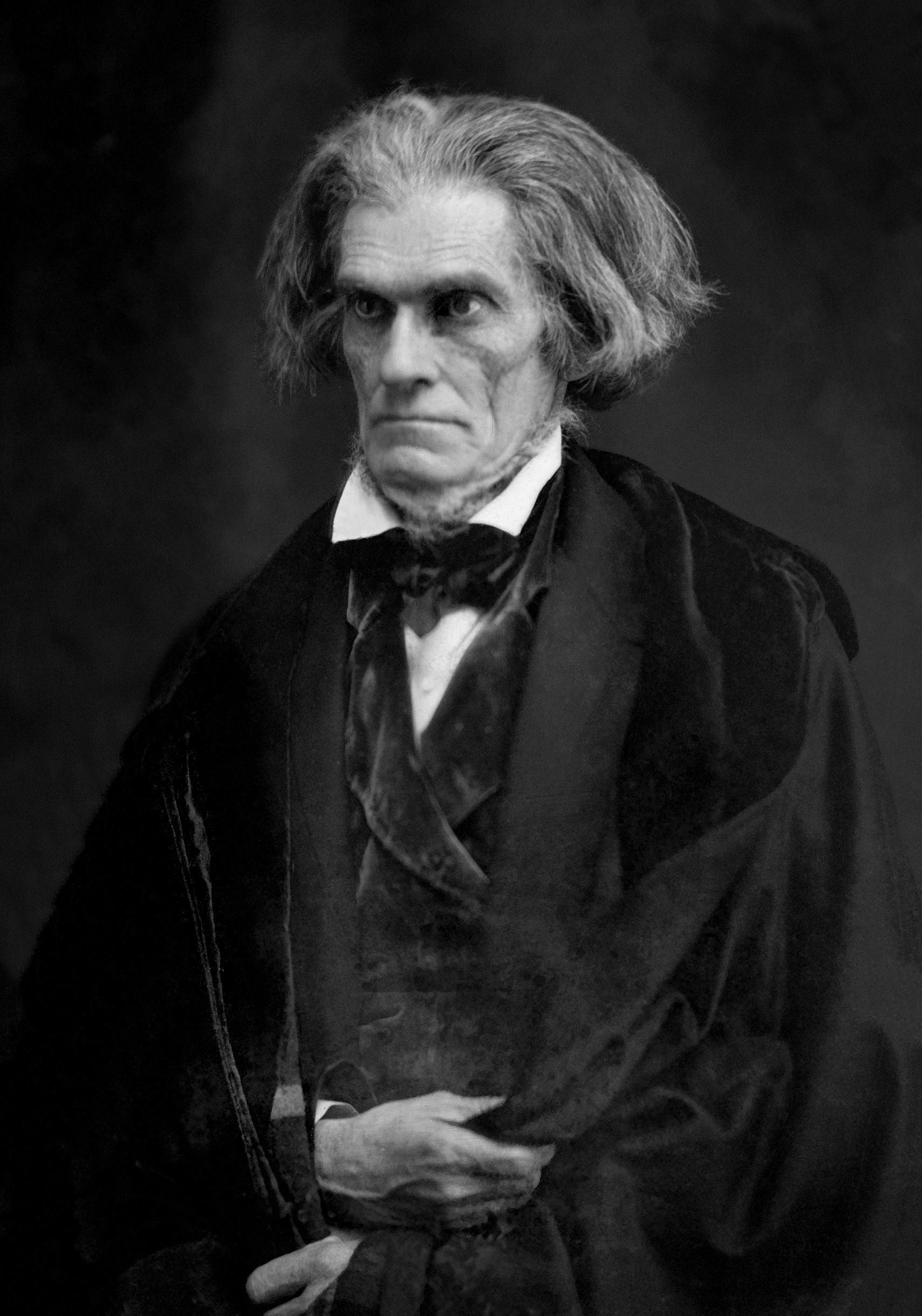
Calhoun photographed by Mathew Brady in 1849, shortly before his death

Calhoun was re-elected to the Senate in 1845 following the resignation of Daniel Elliott Huger. He soon became vocally opposed to the Mexican–American War. He believed that it would distort the national character by undermining republicanism in favor of empire and by bringing non-white persons into the country. When Congress declared war against Mexico on May 13, he abstained from voting on the measure. In South Carolina, Calhoun received some praise for his principled position, but support for the war was high in spite of his opposition. Calhoun also vigorously opposed the Wilmot Proviso, an 1846 proposal by Pennsylvania Representative David Wilmot to ban slavery in all newly acquired territories. The House of Representatives, through its Northern majority, passed the provision. However, the Senate never approved the measure.

=== Oregon boundary dispute ===
A major crisis emerged from the persistent Oregon boundary dispute between Great Britain and the United States, due to an increasing number of American migrants. The territory included most of present-day British Columbia, Washington, Oregon, and Idaho. American expansionists used the slogan "54–40 or fight" in reference to the Northern boundary coordinates of the Oregon territory. The parties compromised, ending the war threat, by splitting the area down the middle at the 49th parallel, with the British acquiring British Columbia and the Americans accepting Washington and Oregon. Calhoun, along with President Polk and Secretary of State James Buchanan, continued work on the treaty while he was a senator, and it was ratified by a vote of 41–14 on June 18, 1846.

=== Rejection of the Compromise of 1850 ===
The Compromise of 1850, devised by Clay and Stephen A. Douglas, a first-term Democratic senator from Illinois, was designed to solve the controversy over the status of slavery in the vast new territories acquired from Mexico. Many pro-slavery Southerners opposed it as inadequate protection for slavery, and Calhoun helped organize the Nashville Convention, which would meet in June to discuss possible Southern secession. The 67-year-old Calhoun had suffered periodic bouts of tuberculosis throughout his life. In March 1850, the disease reached a critical stage. Weeks from death and too feeble to speak, Calhoun wrote a blistering attack on the Compromise that would become his most famous speech. On March 4 a friend and disciple, Senator James Mason of Virginia, read his remarks. Calhoun affirmed the right of the South to leave the Union in response to what he called Northern subjugation, specifically the North's growing opposition to the South's "peculiar institution" of slavery. He warned that the day "the balance between the two sections" was destroyed would be a day not far removed from disunion, anarchy, and civil war. Calhoun queried how the Union might be preserved in light of subjugation of the "weaker" party—the pro-slavery South—by the "stronger" party, the anti-slavery North. He maintained that the responsibility of solving the question lay entirely on the North—as the stronger section, to allow the Southern minority an equal share in governance and to cease its anti-slavery agitation. He added:

If you who represent the stronger portion, cannot agree to settle them on the broad principle of justice and duty, say so; and let the States we both represent agree to separate and part in peace. If you are unwilling we should part in peace, tell us so; and we shall know what to do, when you reduce the question to submission or resistance.

Calhoun died soon afterward, and although the Compromise measures did eventually pass, Calhoun's ideas about states' rights attracted increasing attention across the South. Historian William Barney argues that Calhoun's ideas proved "appealing to Southerners concerned with preserving slavery. ...Southern radicals known as 'Fire-Eaters' pushed the doctrine of states' rights to its logical extreme by upholding the constitutional right of the state to secede".

== Death and burial ==
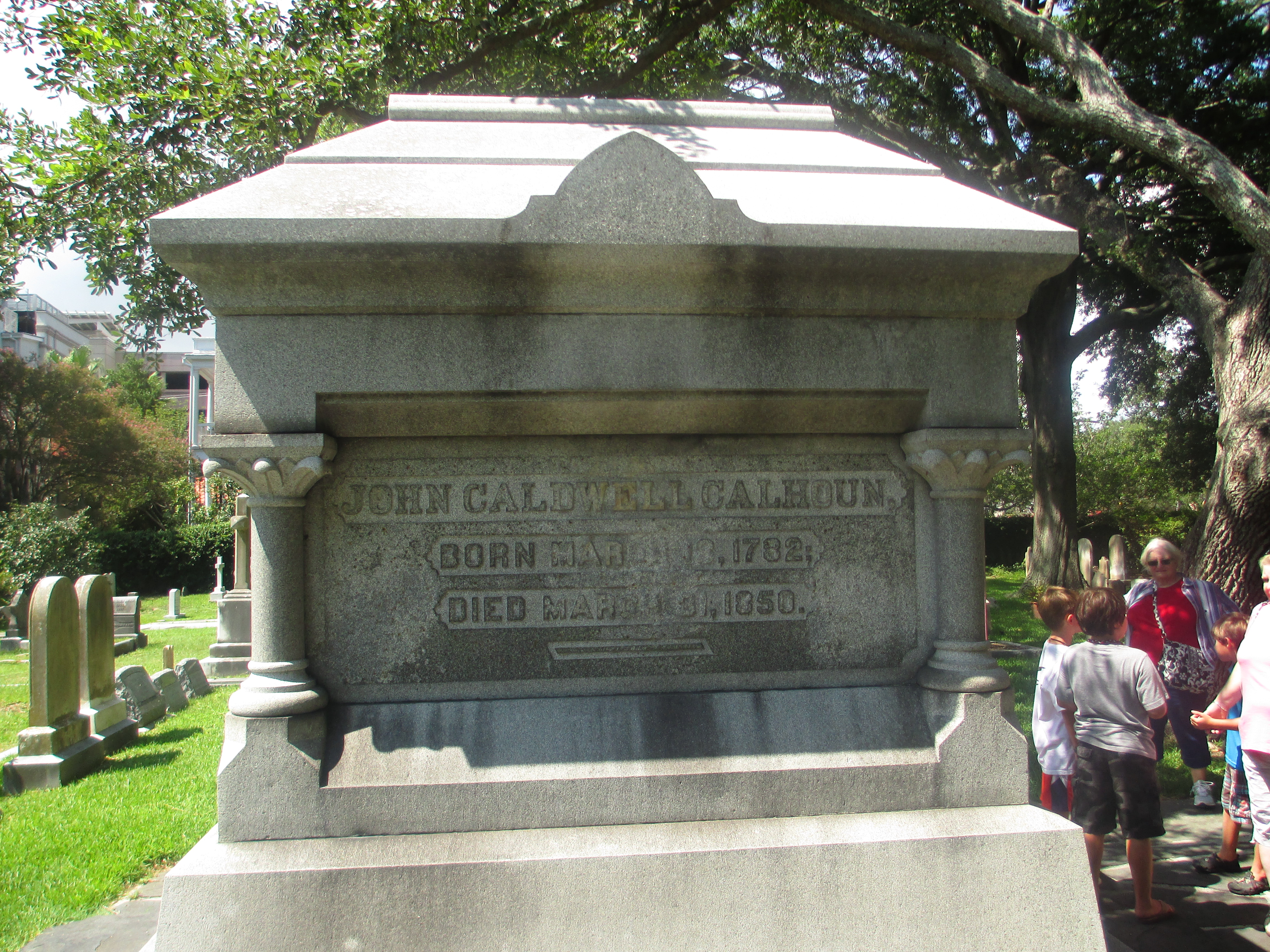
Calhoun's grave at St. Philip's Church yard in Charleston

Calhoun died at the Old Brick Capitol boarding house in Washington, D.C., on March 31, 1850, of tuberculosis, at the age of 68. The last words attributed to him were "The South, the poor South!"

He was interred at St. Philip's Churchyard in Charleston, South Carolina. During the Civil War, a group of Calhoun's friends were concerned about the possible desecration of his grave by Federal troops and, during the night, removed his coffin to a hiding place under the stairs of the church. The next night, his coffin was buried in an unmarked grave near the church, where it remained until 1871 when it was again exhumed and returned to its original place.

After Calhoun had died, an associate suggested that Senator Thomas Hart Benton give a eulogy in honor of Calhoun on the floor of the Senate. Benton, a devoted Unionist, declined, saying: "He is not dead, sir—he is not dead. There may be no vitality in his body, but there is in his doctrines."

The Clemson University campus in South Carolina occupies the site of Calhoun's Fort Hill plantation, which he bequeathed to his wife and daughter. They sold it and its 50 slaves to a relative. When that owner died, Thomas Green Clemson foreclosed the mortgage. He later bequeathed the property to the state for use as an agricultural college to be named after him.

Calhoun's widow, Floride, died on July 25, 1866, and was buried in St. Paul's Episcopal Church Cemetery in Pendleton, South Carolina, near their children, but apart from her husband.

== Political philosophy ==
=== Agrarian republicanism ===
Historian Lee H. Cheek Jr. characterizes Calhoun's American republicanism as within the South Atlantic tradition, as opposed to the Puritan tradition. While the New England–based puritan tradition stressed a politically centralized enforcement of moral and religious norms to secure civic virtue, the South Atlantic tradition relied on a decentralized moral and religious order based on the idea of subsidiarity (or localism). Cheek considers the 1798 Kentucky and Virginia Resolutions, written by Jefferson and Madison, the cornerstone of Calhoun's republicanism. Calhoun believed that popular rule is best expressed in local communities that are nearly autonomous while serving as units of a larger society.

=== Slavery ===
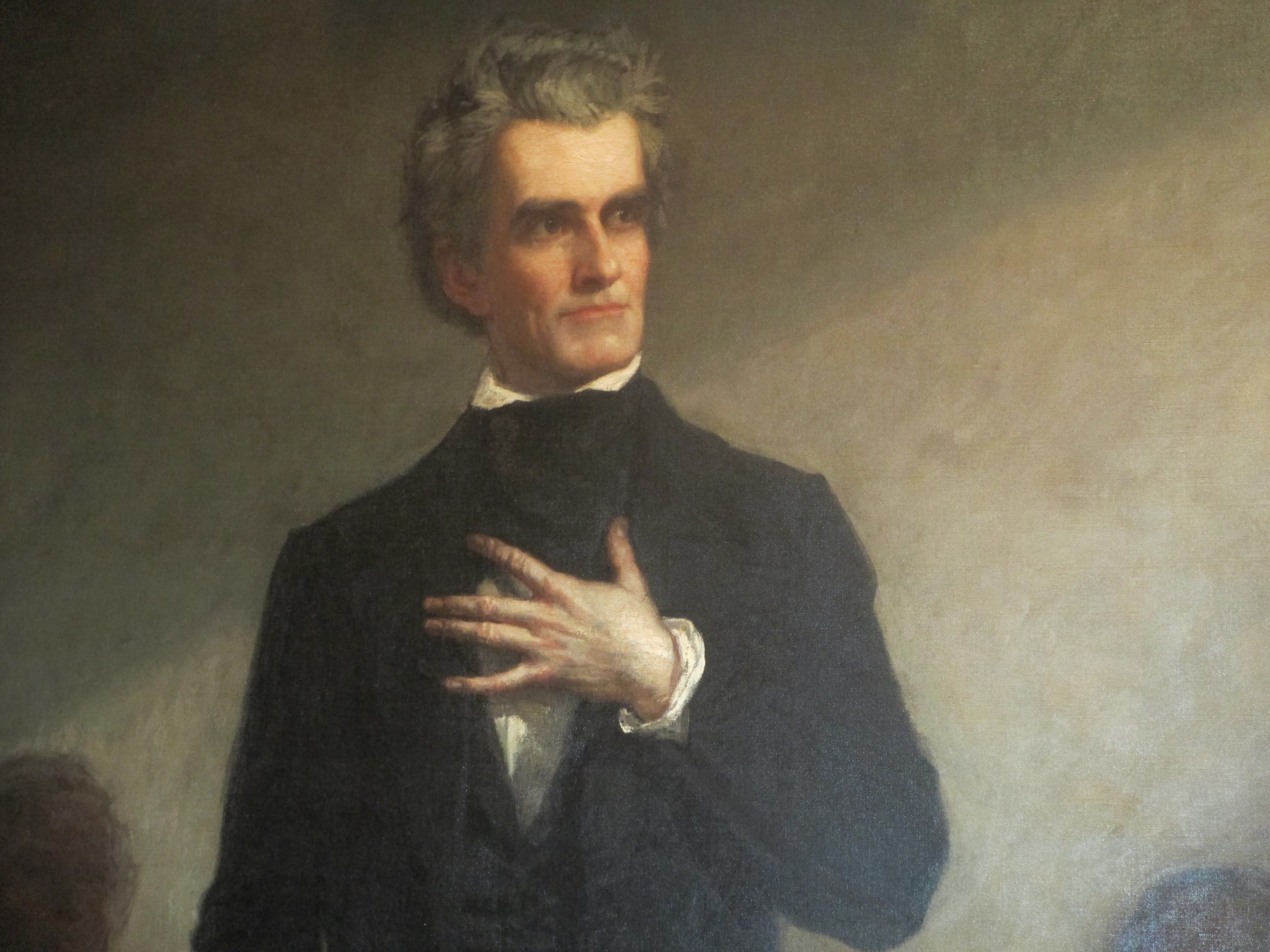
George Peter Alexander Healy's 1851 painting of Calhoun at City Hall in Charleston, South Carolina

Calhoun led the pro-slavery faction in the Senate, opposing both total abolitionism and attempts such as the Wilmot Proviso to limit the expansion of slavery into the western territories.

Calhoun's father, Patrick Calhoun, was a staunch supporter of slavery who taught his son that social standing depended not merely on a commitment to the ideal of popular self-government, but also on the ownership of a substantial number of slaves. Flourishing in a world in which slaveholding was a hallmark of civilization, Calhoun saw little reason to question its morality as an adult. He believed that slavery instilled in white people a code of honor that fostered civic-mindedness. From Calhoun's standpoint, the expansion of slavery decreased the likelihood for social conflict and postponed the decay of when money would become the only measure of self-worth, as he believed had happened in New England. Calhoun was firmly convinced that slavery was the key to the success of the American dream.

Whereas other Southern politicians had excused slavery as a "necessary evil", in a famous speech on the Senate floor on February 6, 1837, Calhoun asserted that slavery was a "positive good". He rooted this claim on three grounds: white supremacy, paternalism and capitalism. All societies, Calhoun claimed, are ruled by an elite group that enjoys the fruits of the labor of a less-exceptional group. Senator William Cabell Rives of Virginia had earlier referred to slavery as an evil that might become a "lesser evil" in some circumstances. Calhoun believed that conceded too much to the abolitionists:

I take higher ground. I hold that in the present state of civilization, where two races of different origin, and distinguished by color, and other physical differences, as well as intellectual, are brought together, the relation now existing in the slaveholding States between the two, is, instead of an evil, a good—a positive good ... I may say with truth, that in few countries so much is left to the share of the laborer, and so little exacted from him, or where there is more kind attention paid to him in sickness or infirmities of age. Compare his condition with the tenants of the poor houses in the more civilized portions of Europe—look at the sick, and the old and infirm slave, on one hand, in the midst of his family and friends, under the kind superintending care of his master and mistress, and compare it with the forlorn and wretched condition of the pauper in the poorhouse ... I hold then, that there never has yet existed a wealthy and civilized society in which one portion of the community did not, in point of fact, live on the labor of the other.

Calhoun's treatment of his own slaves includes an incident in 1831, when his slave Alick ran away when threatened with a severe whipping. Calhoun wrote to his second cousin and brother-in-law, asking him to keep a lookout for Alick, and if he was taken, to have him "severely whipped" and sent back. In a letter to Alick's captor, Calhoun wrote:

I am glad to hear that Alick has been apprehended and am much obliged to you for paying the expense of apprehending him .... He ran away for no other cause, but to avoid a correction for some misconduct, and as I am desirous to prevent a repetition, I wish you to have him lodged in Jail for one week, to be fed on bread and water and to employ some one for me to give him 30 lashes well laid on, at the end of the time.

Calhoun rejected the belief of Southern leaders, such as Henry Clay, that all Americans could agree on the "opinion and feeling" that slavery was wrong, although they might disagree on the most practicable way to respond to that great wrong. Calhoun's constitutional ideas acted as a viable conservative alternative to Northern appeals to democracy, majority rule, and natural rights.

As well as providing an intellectual justification of slavery, Calhoun played a central role in devising the South's overall political strategy. According to historian Ulrich B. Phillips,

[Calhoun's] devices were manifold: to suppress agitation, to praise the slaveholding system; to promote white Southern prosperity and expansion; to procure a Western alliance; to frame a fresh plan of government by concurrent majorities; to form a Southern bloc; to warn the North of the dangers of Southern desperation; to appeal for Northern magnanimity as indispensable for the saving of the Union.

Shortly after delivering his speech against the Compromise of 1850, Calhoun predicted the destruction of the Union over the slavery issue. Speaking to Senator Mason, he said:

I fix its probable occurrence within twelve years or three presidential terms. You and others of your age will probably live to see it; I shall not. The mode by which it will be done is not so clear; it may be brought about in a manner that no one now foresees. But the probability is, it will explode in a presidential election.

=== Opposition to the War with Mexico ===
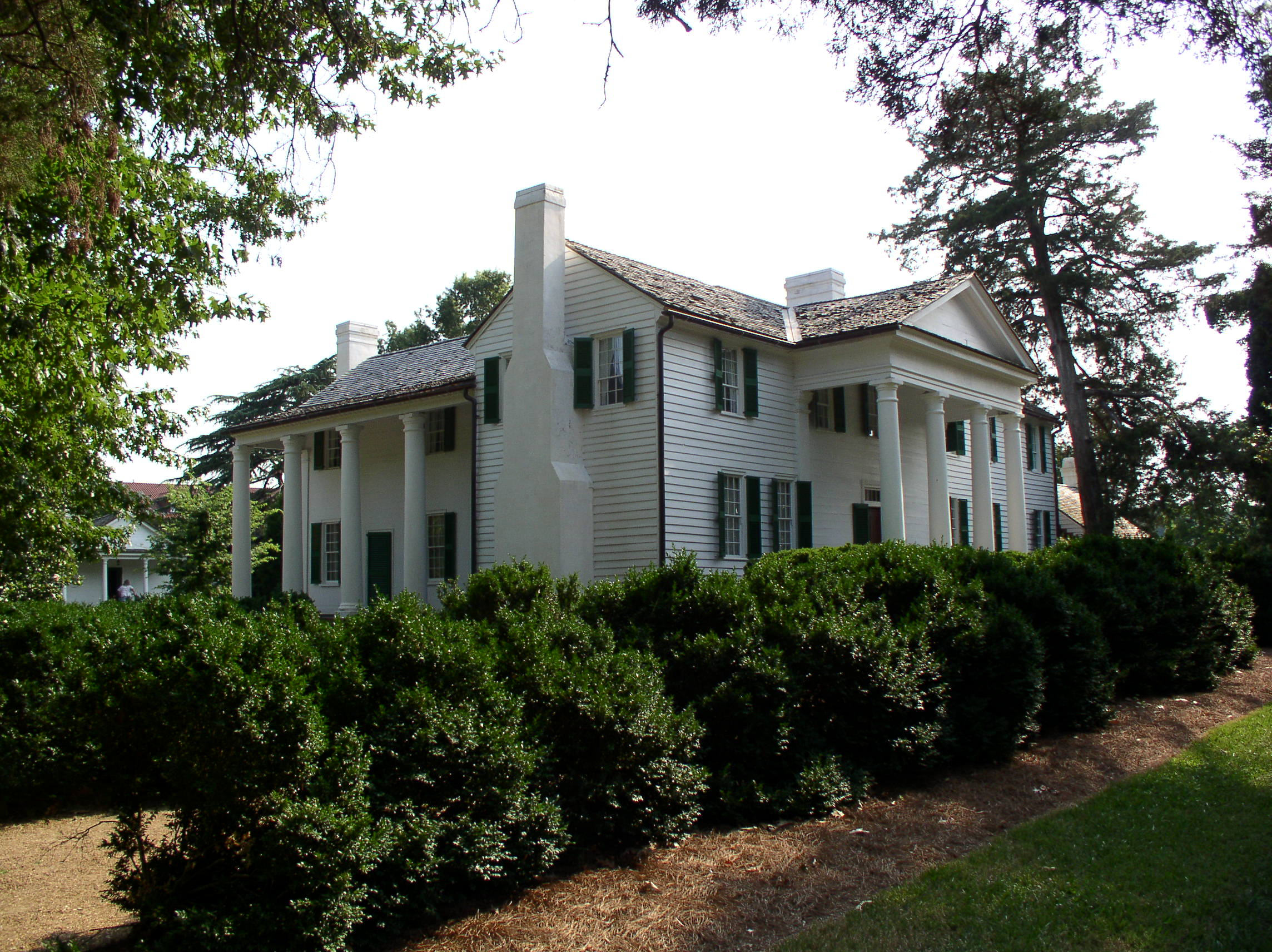
Calhoun's home, Fort Hill, on the grounds that became part of Clemson University, in Clemson, South Carolina

Calhoun was consistently opposed to the War with Mexico, arguing that an enlarged military effort would only feed the alarming and growing lust of the public for empire regardless of its constitutional dangers, bloat executive powers and patronage, and saddle the republic with a soaring debt that would disrupt finances and encourage speculation. Calhoun feared, moreover, that Southern slave owners would be shut out of any conquered Mexican territories, as nearly happened with the Wilmot Proviso. He argued that the war would detrimentally lead to the annexation of all of Mexico, which would bring Mexicans into the country, whom he considered deficient in moral and intellectual terms. He said, in a speech on January 4, 1848:

We make a great mistake, sir, when we suppose that all people are capable of self-government. We are anxious to force free government on all; and I see that it has been urged in a very respectable quarter, that it is the mission of this country to spread civil and religious liberty over all the world, and especially over this continent. It is a great mistake. None but people advanced to a very high state of moral and intellectual improvement are capable, in a civilized state, of maintaining free government; and amongst those who are so purified, very few, indeed, have had the good fortune of forming a constitution capable of endurance.

Calhoun argued that a war for territory was morally wrong and felt that the Polk administration had been too aggressive in trying to force a war. Anti-slavery Northerners denounced the war as a Southern conspiracy to expand slavery; Calhoun in turn perceived a connivance of Yankees to destroy the South. By 1847 he decided the Union was threatened by a totally corrupt party system. He believed that in their lust for office, patronage and spoils, politicians in the North pandered to the anti-slavery vote, especially during presidential campaigns, and politicians in the slave states sacrificed Southern rights in an effort to placate the Northern wings of their parties. Thus, the essential first step in any successful assertion of Southern rights had to be the jettisoning of all party ties. In 1848–49, Calhoun tried to give substance to his call for Southern unity. He was the driving force behind the drafting and publication of the "Address of the Southern Delegates in Congress, to Their Constituents". It alleged Northern violations of the constitutional rights of the South, then warned Southern voters to expect forced emancipation of slaves in the near future, followed by their complete subjugation by an unholy alliance of unprincipled Northerners and blacks. Whites would flee and the South would "become the permanent abode of disorder, anarchy, poverty, misery, and wretchedness". Only the immediate and unflinching unity of Southern whites could prevent such a disaster. Such unity would either bring the North to its senses or lay the foundation for an independent South. But the spirit of union was still strong in the region and fewer than 40% of the Southern congressmen signed the address, and only one Whig.

Many Southerners believed his warnings and read every political news story from the North as further evidence of the planned destruction of the white southern way of life. The climax came a decade after Calhoun's death with the election of Republican Abraham Lincoln in 1860, which led to the secession of South Carolina, followed by six other Southern states. They formed the new Confederate States, which, in accordance with Calhoun's theory, did not have any organized political parties.

=== Concurrent majority ===
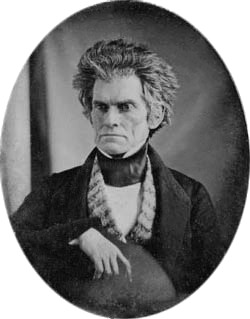
Undated photograph of Calhoun

Calhoun's basic concern for protecting the diversity of minority interests is expressed in his chief contribution to political science—the idea of a concurrent majority across different groups as distinguished from a numerical majority. A concurrent majority is a system in which a minority group is permitted to exercise a sort of veto power over actions of a majority that are believed to infringe upon the minority's rights.

According to the principle of a numerical majority, the will of the more numerous citizens should always rule, regardless of the burdens on the minority. Such a principle tends toward a consolidation of power in which the interests of the absolute majority always prevail over those of the minority. Calhoun believed that the great achievement of the American constitution was in checking the tyranny of a numerical majority through institutional procedures that required a concurrent majority, such that each important interest must consent to the actions of government. To secure a concurrent majority, those interests that have a numerical majority must compromise with the interests that are in the minority. A concurrent majority requires a unanimous consent of all the major interests in a community, which is the only sure way of preventing tyranny of the majority. This idea supported Calhoun's doctrine of interposition or nullification, in which the state governments could refuse to enforce or comply with a policy of the Federal government that threatened the vital interests of the states.

Historian Richard Hofstadter (1948) emphasizes that Calhoun's conception of minority was very different from the minorities of a century later:

Not in the slightest was [Calhoun] concerned with minority rights as they are chiefly of interest to the modern liberal mind—the rights of dissenters to express unorthodox opinions, of the individual conscience against the State, least of all of ethnic minorities. At bottom he was not interested in any minority that was not a propertied minority. The concurrent majority itself was a device without relevance to the protection of dissent, designed to protect a vested interest of considerable power ... it was minority privileges rather than [minority] rights that he really proposed to protect.

Unlike Jefferson, Calhoun rejected attempts at economic, social, or political leveling, claiming that true equality could not be achieved if all classes were given equal rights and responsibilities. Rather, to ensure true prosperity, it was necessary for a stronger group to provide protection and care for the weaker one. This meant that the two groups should not be equal before the law. For Calhoun, "protection" (order) was more important than freedom. Individual rights were something to be earned, not something bestowed by nature or God. Calhoun was concerned with protecting the interests of the Southern States (which he identified with the interests of their slaveholding elites) as a distinct and beleaguered minority among the members of the federal Union; his idea of a concurrent majority as a protection for minority rights has gained some acceptance in American political thought. Political scientist Malcolm Jewell argues, "The decision-making process in this country resembles John Calhoun's 'concurrent majority': A large number of groups both within and outside the government must, in practice, approve any major policy."

Calhoun's ideas on the concurrent majority are illustrated in A Disquisition on Government. The Disquisition is a 100-page essay on Calhoun's definitive and comprehensive ideas on government, which he worked on intermittently for six years until its 1849 completion. It systematically presents his arguments that a numerical majority in any government will typically impose a despotism over a minority unless some way is devised to secure the assent of all classes, sections, and interests and, similarly, that innate human depravity would debase government in a democracy.

=== State sovereignty and the "Calhoun Doctrine" ===
In the 1840s three interpretations of the constitutional powers of Congress to deal with slavery in territories emerged: the "free-soil doctrine," the "popular sovereignty position," and the "Calhoun doctrine". The Free Soilers stated that Congress had the power to outlaw slavery in the territories. The popular sovereignty position argued that the voters living there should decide. The Calhoun doctrine said that neither Congress nor the citizens of the territories could outlaw slavery in the territories.

In what historian Robert R. Russell calls the "Calhoun Doctrine", Calhoun argued that the Federal Government's role in the territories was only that of the trustee or agent of the several sovereign states: it was obliged not to discriminate among the states and hence was incapable of forbidding the bringing into any territory of anything that was legal property in any state. Calhoun argued that citizens from every state had the right to take their property to any territory. Congress and local voters, he asserted, had no authority to place restrictions on slavery in the territories. In a February 1847 speech before the Senate, Calhoun declared that "the enactment of any law which should directly, or by its effects, deprive the citizens of any of the States of this Union from emigrating, with their property, in to any of the territories of the United States, will make such discrimination and would therefore be a violation of the Constitution". Enslavers therefore had a fundamental right to take their property wherever they wished. As constitutional historian Hermann von Holst noted, "Calhoun's doctrine made it a solemn constitutional duty of the United States government and of the American people to act as if the existence or non-existence of slavery in the Territories did not concern them in the least." The Calhoun Doctrine was opposed by the Free Soil forces, which merged into the new Republican Party around 1854. Chief Justice Roger B. Taney used Calhoun's arguments in his decision in the 1857 Supreme Court case Dred Scott v. Sandford, in which he ruled that the federal government could not prohibit slavery in any of the territories.

== Legacy ==
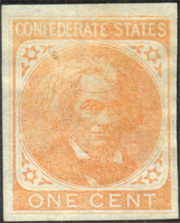
John C. Calhoun postage stamp, CSA issue of 1862, unused

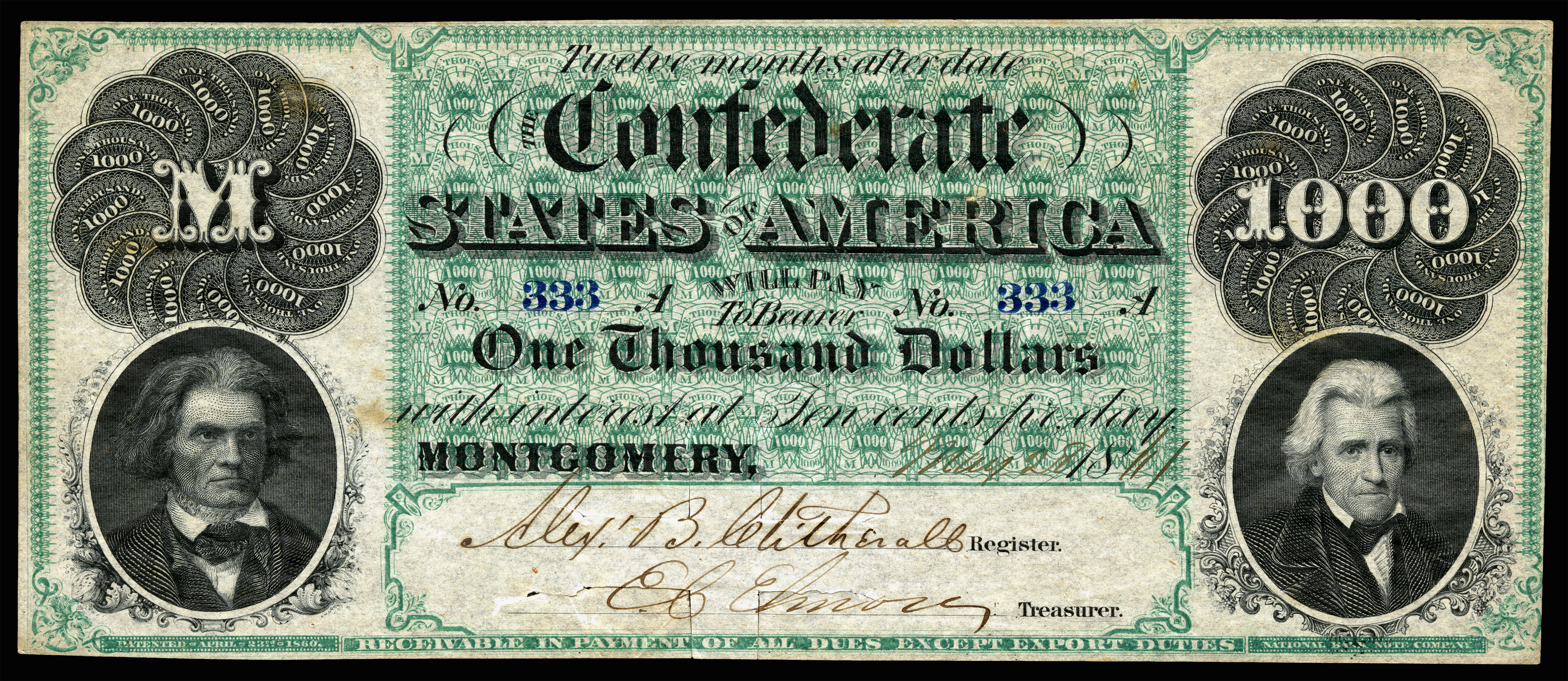
Confederate First issue banknote depicting both Calhoun and Andrew Jackson (Act of March 9, 1861)

=== Historical reputation ===
Calhoun was despised by Jackson and his supporters for his alleged attempts to subvert the unity of the nation for his own political gain. On his deathbed, Jackson regretted that he had not had Calhoun executed for treason. "My country," he declared, "would have sustained me in the act, and his fate would have been a warning to traitors in all time to come." Even after his death, Calhoun's reputation among Jacksonians remained poor. They disparaged him by portraying him as a man thirsty for power, who when he failed to attain it, sought to tear down his country with him.

According to Parton, writing in 1860:

The old Jackson men of the inner set still speak of Mr. Calhoun in terms which show that they consider him at once the most wicked and the most despicable of American statesmen. He was a coward, conspirator, hypocrite, traitor, and fool, say they. He strove, schemed, dreamed, lived only for the presidency; and when he despaired of reaching that office through honorable means, he sought to rise upon the ruins of his country-thinking it better to reign in South Carolina than to serve in the United States. General Jackson lived and died in this opinion.

Writing more than thirty years after Calhoun's death, James G. Blaine portrayed him as a mix of personal integrity and wrongheaded ideology:

Deplorable as was the end to which his teachings led, he could not have acquired the influence he wielded over millions of men unless he had been gifted with acute intellect, distinguished by moral excellence, and inspired by the sincerest belief in the righteousness of his cause. History will adjudge him to have been single-hearted and honest in his political creed. It will equally adjudge him to have been wrong in his theory of the Federal Government, and dead to the awakened sentiment of Christendom in his views concerning the enslavement of man.

Charles E. Merriam said Calhoun should rank as one of America's strongest political theorists of the first half of the 19th century, with reasoning that was keen and strong, but also narrow and cramped. Calhoun was described as "the Marx of the master class" by historian Richard Hofstadter.

Calhoun is often remembered for his defense of minority rights, in the context of defending white Southern interests from perceived Northern threats, by use of the "concurrent majority". He is also noted and criticized for his strong defense of slavery. These positions played an enormous role in influencing Southern secessionist leaders by strengthening the trend of sectionalism, thus contributing to the Civil War.

External videos
- Booknotes interview with Irving Bartlett on John C. Calhoun: A Biography, August 16, 1994, C-SPAN

Biographer Irving Bartlett wrote:

Posterity decided against Calhoun's argument for the indefinite protection of slavery more than 130 years ago. What he had to say about the need in popular governments like our own to protect the rights of minorities, about the importance of choosing leaders with character, talent, and the willingness to speak hard truths to the people, and about the enduring need, in a vast and various country like our own, for the people themselves to develop and sustain both the civic culture and the institutional structures which contribute to their lasting interest is as fresh and significant today as it was in 1850.

Calhoun has been held in regard by some Lost Cause of the Confederacy historians, who hold a romanticized view of the antebellum Southern way of life and its cause during the Civil War. Historians such as Charles M. Wiltse and Margaret Coit have, in their writings, portrayed Calhoun as a sympathetic or heroic figure.

John Niven paints a portrait of Calhoun that is both sympathetic and tragic. He says that Calhoun's ambition and personal desires "were often thwarted by lesser men than he". Niven identifies Calhoun as a "driven man and a tragic figure". He argues that Calhoun was motivated by the near-disaster of the War of 1812, of which he was a "thoughtless advocate," to work towards fighting for the freedoms and securities of the white Southern people against any kind of threat. Ultimately, Niven says, he "would overcompensate and in the end would more than any other individual destroy the culture he sought to preserve, perpetuating for several generations the very insecurity that had shaped his public career".

In 1957, a five-member "special" committee, led by Senator John F. Kennedy, selected Calhoun as one of the five senators to enter the newly created senatorial pantheon "hall of fame". This "hall of fame" was established to fill five vacant portrait spaces in the Senate Reception Room.

Recently, Calhoun's reputation has suffered particularly due to his defense of slavery. The racially motivated Charleston church shooting in South Carolina in June 2015 reinvigorated demands for the removal of monuments dedicated to prominent pro-slavery and Confederate States figures. That month, the monument to Calhoun in Charleston was found vandalized, with spray-painted denunciations of Calhoun as a racist and a defender of slavery. Later, in 2020, during the George Floyd protests in South Carolina, the monument was vandalized with signs and spray paint, with calls from the public demanding its removal, causing the city of Charleston to erect a chain-link fence around the statue to prevent the public from accessing it, before announcing on June 23, 2020, that the statue would be removed.

In response to decades of requests, Yale President Peter Salovey announced in 2017 that the university's Calhoun College would be renamed to honor Grace Hopper, a pioneering computer programmer, mathematician and Navy rear admiral who graduated from Yale. Calhoun is commemorated elsewhere on the campus, including the exterior of Harkness Tower, a prominent campus landmark, as one of Yale's "Eight Worthies".

=== Monuments and memorials ===
Many different places, streets, and schools were named after Calhoun. Some, such as Springfield, Illinois (1832), and Jackson County, Kansas (1859), were subsequently renamed. The "Immortal Trio" (Calhoun, Daniel Webster, and Henry Clay) were memorialized with streets in Uptown New Orleans.

In June 2020, Clemson University removed John C. Calhoun's name from Clemson University Calhoun Honors College, renaming it to Clemson University Honors College. This action was taken in response to a petition which was supported by NFL stars DeAndre Hopkins and Deshaun Watson who are Clemson University alumni. Against the backdrop of the George Floyd protests, University chairman Smyth McKissick said that "we must recognize there are central figures in Clemson's history whose ideals, beliefs and actions do not represent the university's core values of respect and diversity".

The Confederate government honored Calhoun on a 1¢ postage stamp, which was printed in 1862 but was never officially released.

In 1887, at the height of the Jim Crow era, white segregationists erected a monument to Calhoun in Marion Square in Charleston, South Carolina; the base was within easy reach and the local black population defaced it. Finally, it was replaced in 1896 standing atop a column base at a total of 115 feet as well as fenced in to deter attackers. It continued as a target of vandalism regardless. The statue has been a topic of debate for a long time. In 2017, Charleston's city council deferred a proposal to put a plaque on the statue that would have stated his white-supremacist views. It was No. 5 on the Make It Right Project's 2018 list of the 10 Confederate monuments it most wanted removed. The Make It Right Project organized a protest at the monument on May 16, 2019. The monument was removed on June 24, 2020, following a unanimous vote by the Charleston City Council to relocate the monument.

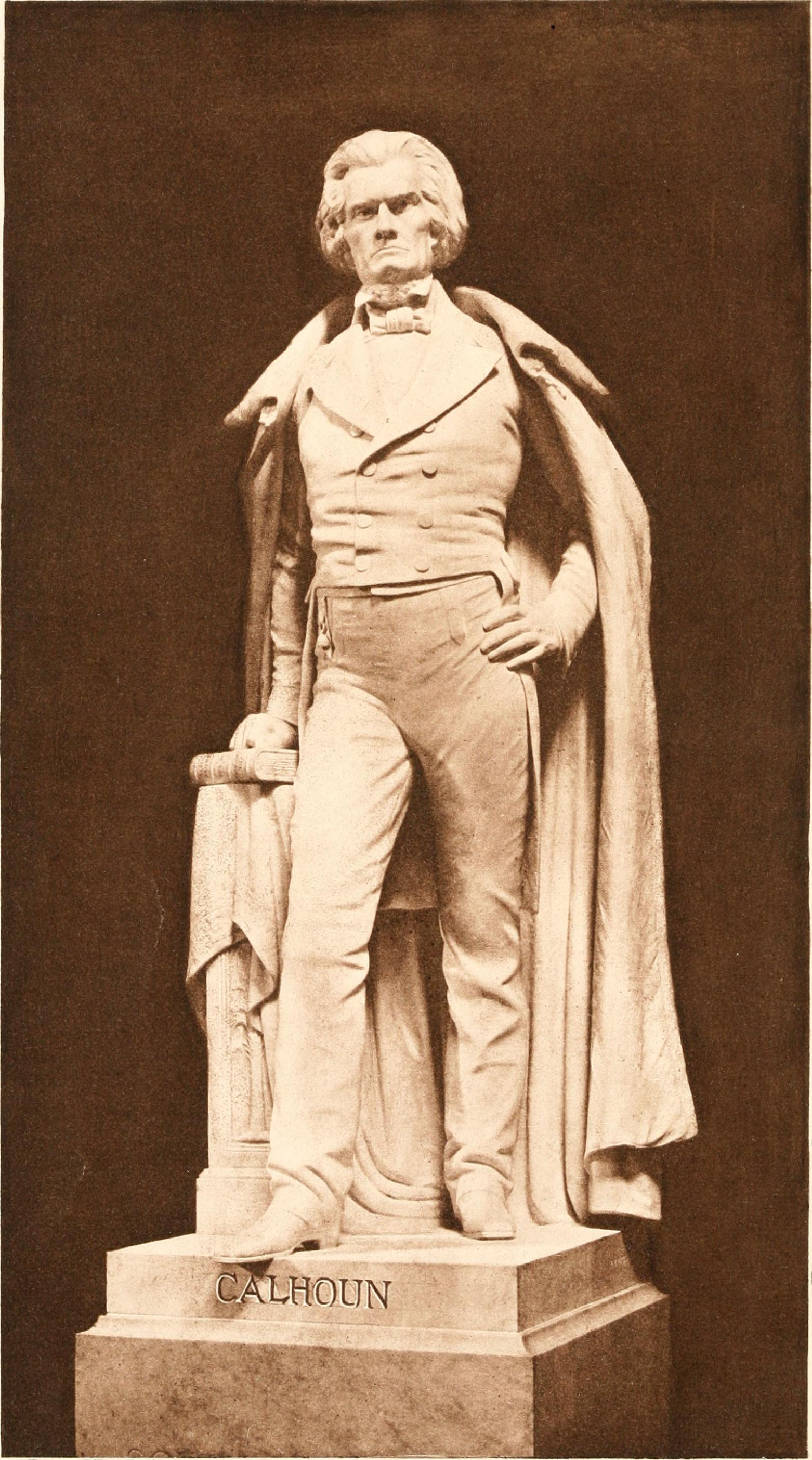
John C. Calhoun statue in National Statuary Hall Collection at the U.S. Capitol

In 1910, the state of South Carolina gave a statue of Calhoun to the National Statuary Hall Collection in the United States Capitol. Also in the Capitol, there is an 1896 bust of Calhoun in the U.S. Senate Vice Presidential Bust Collection, and he is one of the "Famous Five" former members originally selected by the Senate in 1957 to be honored with a portrait in Senate Reception Room.

In 1817, surveyors sent by Secretary of War Calhoun to map the area around Fort Snelling named the largest lake in what became Minneapolis, Minnesota, for him. Two centuries later, the city of Minneapolis renamed the lake with the Dakota language name Bde Maka Ska, meaning "White Earth Lake" or "White Banks Lake". The Calhoun-Isles Community Band in the Uptown district of Minneapolis changed its name to City of Lakes Community Band in November 2018, to distance itself from Calhoun's pro-slavery legacy, following the renaming of the lake. Calhoun Square and Calhoun Beach Club, both in Minneapolis, announced name changes, and the road around the lake was renamed Bde Maka Ska Parkway. In 2022, the city councilors of Savannah, Georgia, voted unanimously to remove his name from Calhoun Square.

=== Film and television ===
Calhoun was portrayed by Arliss Howard in the 1997 film Amistad. The film depicts the controversy and legal battle surrounding the status of slaves who in 1839 rebelled against their transporters on the La Amistad slave ship.

== See also ==
- Bibliography of John C. Calhoun
- List of places named for John C. Calhoun
- List of members of the United States Congress who died in office (1790–1899)
- USS John C. Calhoun
- Rhea letter § 1827–1832 political warfare

== Bibliography ==
=== Biographies ===
- Bartlett, Irving (1994). John C. Calhoun: A Biography. New York: W.W. Norton, Inc. ISBN 978-0-393-33286-5.
- Coit, Margaret L. (1950). John C. Calhoun: American Portrait. Boston: Houghton, Mifflin.; popular biography
- von Holst, Hermann E. (1883). John C. Calhoun. Boston: Houghton Mifflin and Company.; outdated
- Meigs, William Montgomery (1917). The Life of John Caldwell Calhoun. Washington, D.C.: Neale Publishing Company.
- Niven, John (1988). John C. Calhoun and the Price of Union: A Biography. Baton Rouge: LSU Press. ISBN 978-0-8071-1858-0.
- Wiltse, Charles M. (1944). John C. Calhoun, Nationalist, 1782–1828. Indianapolis: Bobbs-Merrill Company.
- "John Caldwell Calhoun." Dictionary of American Biography (1936) online

=== Specialized studies ===
- Ashworth, John (1995). Slavery, Capitalism, and Politics in the Antebellum Republic: Volume 1, Commerce and Compromise, 1820–1850. Cambridge: Cambridge University Press. ISBN 978-0-521-47487-0.
- Baptist, Edward E. (2014). The Half has Never Been Told: Slavery and the Making of American Capitalism. New York: Basic Books. ISBN 978-04650-0296-2.
- Barney, William L. (2011). The Oxford Encyclopedia of the Civil War. Oxford / New York: Oxford University Press. ISBN 978-0-19-978201-7.
- Baskin, Darryl (1969). "The Pluralist Vision of John C. Calhoun". Polity. 2 (1): 49–65. doi:10.2307/3234088. JSTOR 3234088. S2CID 147534167.
- Bates, Christopher G. (2015). The Early Republic and Antebellum America: An Encyclopedia of Social, Political, Cultural, and Economic History. Routledge. ISBN 978-1-317-45740-4.
- Belko, William S. (2004). "John C. Calhoun and the Creation of the Bureau of Indian Affairs: An Essay on Political Rivalry, Ideology, and Policymaking in the Early Republic". South Carolina Historical Magazine. 105 (3): 170–197. JSTOR 27570693.
- Borneman, Walter R. (2009). Polk: The Man Who Transformed the Presidency and America. New York: Random House. ISBN 978-1-58836-772-3.
- Brands, H.W. (2005). Andrew Jackson: His Life and Times. New York: Knopf Doubleday Publishing Group. ISBN 1-4000-3072-2.
- Byrnes, Mark E. (2001). James K. Polk: A Biographical Companion. New York, NY: Bloomsbury Publishing USA. ISBN 978-1-57607-535-7.
- Capers, Gerald M. (1960). John C. Calhoun, Opportunist: A Reappraisal. Vol. 14. Gainesville: University of Florida Press. Archived from the original on June 10, 2012 – via Questia.
- Cheathem, Mark Renfred (2008). Jacksonian and Antebellum Age: People and Perspectives. Santa Barbara, CA: ABC-CLIO. ISBN 978-1-59884-017-9.
- Cheek, H. Lee (2004). Calhoun and Popular Rule: The Political Theory of the Disquisition and Discourse. Columbia, MO: University of Missouri Press. ISBN 978-0-8262-1548-2.
- Crallé, R.K., ed. (1888). "Report Prepared for the Committee on Federal Relations of the Legislature of South Carolina, at its Session in November, 1831". The Works of John C. Calhoun. Vol. VI. D. Appleton.
- Douglas, Bradburn (2009). The Citizenship Revolution: Politics and the Creation of the American Union, 1774–1804. Charlottesville: University of Virginia Press. ISBN 978-0-8139-3031-2.
- Durham, David I. (2008). A Southern Moderate in Radical Times: Henry Washington Hilliard, 1808–1892. Baton Rouge: LSU Press. ISBN 978-0-8071-3422-1.
- Ellis, James H. (2009). A Ruinous and Unhappy War: New England and the War of 1812. New York: Algora Publishing. ISBN 978-0-87586-691-8.
- Fehrenbacher, Don Edward (1981). Slavery, Law, and Politics: The Dred Scott Case in Historical Perspective. Oxford / New York: Oxford University Press. ISBN 978-0-19-502883-6.
- Foner, Eric (1995). Free Soil, Free Labor, Free Men: The Ideology of the Republican Party before the Civil War: With a new Introductory Essay. Oxford / New York: Oxford University Press. ISBN 978-0-19-509497-8.
- Ford, Lacy K. Jr (1988). "Republican Ideology in a Slave Society: The Political Economy of John C. Calhoun". Journal of Southern History. 54 (3): 405–424. doi:10.2307/2208996. JSTOR 2208996.
- Ford, Lacy K. Jr (1994). "Inventing the Concurrent Majority: Madison, Calhoun, and the Problem of Majoritarianism in American Political Thought". Journal of Southern History. 60 (1): 19–58. doi:10.2307/2210719. JSTOR 2210719.
- Freehling, William W. (1965). "Spoilsmen and Interests in the Thought and Career of John C. Calhoun". Journal of American History. 52 (1): 25–42. doi:10.2307/1901122. JSTOR 1901122.
- Hofstadter, Richard (2011). "John C. Calhoun: The Marx of the Master Class". The American Political Tradition: And the Men Who Made it. New York: Knopf Doubleday Publishing Group. ISBN 978-0-307-80966-7.
- Holt, Michael F. (2004). The Fate of Their Country: Politicians, Slavery Extension, and the Coming of the Civil War. New York: Hill and Wang. ISBN 978-0-8090-9518-6.
- Howe, Daniel Walker (2007). What Hath God Wrought: the Transformation of America, 1815–1848. Oxford / New York: Oxford University Press. ISBN 978-0-19-507894-7.
- Jervey, Theodore Dehon (1909). Robert Y. Hayne and His Times. New York: The MacMillan Company.
- Jewell, Malcolm E. (2015). Senatorial Politics and Foreign Policy. Lexington: University Press of Kentucky. ISBN 978-0-8131-6340-6.
- Jewett, James C. (1908). "The United States Congress of 1817 and Some of its Celebrities". The William and Mary Quarterly. 17 (2): 139–145. doi:10.2307/1916057. ISSN 0043-5597. JSTOR 1916057.
- Kateb, George (1969). "The Majority Principle: Calhoun and His Antecedents". Political Science Quarterly. 84 (4): 583–605. doi:10.2307/2147126. JSTOR 2147126.
- Kirk, Russell (2001). The Conservative Mind: From Burke to Eliot. Washington, D.C.: Regnery Publishing. ISBN 978-0-89526-171-7.
- Langguth, A.J. (2006). Union 1812: The Americans who Fought the Second War of Independence. New York: Simon & Schuster. ISBN 978-0-7432-2618-9.
- May, Gary (2008). John Tyler. New York: Henry Holt and Company. ISBN 978-0-8050-8238-8.
- Marszalek, John F. (2000) [1997]. The Petticoat Affair: Manners, Mutiny, and Sex in Andrew Jackson's White House. Baton Rouge: LSU Press. ISBN 978-0-8071-5578-3.
- McKellar, Kenneth (1942). Tennessee Senators as Seen by One of their Successors. Kingsport, TN: Southern Publishers, Inc.
- Merk, Frederick (1978). History of the Westward Movement. New York: Alfred A. Knopf, Inc. ISBN 978-0-7432-9743-1.
- Merry, Robert W. (2009). A Country of Vast Designs: James K. Polk, the Mexican War, and the Conquest of the American Continent. New York: Simon & Schuster. ISBN 978-0-7432-9743-1.
- Miller, William Lee (1996). Arguing About Slavery. John Quincy Adams and the Great Battle in the United States Congress. New York: Vintage Books. ISBN 0-394-56922-9.
- Parton, James (1860). Life of Andrew Jackson, Volume 3. New York: Mason Brothers. OCLC 3897681.
- Perkins, Bradford (1961). Prologue to War: England and the United States, 1805–1812. Oakland: University of California Press.
- Perman, Michael (2012). The Southern Political Tradition. LSU Press. ISBN 978-0-8071-4468-8.
- Peterson, Merrill D. (1988). Great Triumvirate: Webster, Clay, and Calhoun. Oxford / New York: Oxford University Press. ISBN 0-19-505686-8.
- Phillips, Ulrich Bonnell (1929). "Calhoun, John Caldwell, 1782–1850". Dictionary of American Biography. Vol. 3. Scribner. pp. 411–419.
- Prucha, Francis Paul (1997). American Indian Treaties: The History of a Political Anomaly. Oakland, California: University of California Press. ISBN 978-0-520-91916-7.
- Remini, Robert V. (1977). Andrew Jackson and the Course of American Empire, 1767–1821. New York: Harper & Row Publishers, Inc. ISBN 0-8018-5912-3.
- Remini, Robert V. (1981). Andrew Jackson and the Course of American Freedom, 1822–1832. New York: Harper & Row Publishers, Inc. ISBN 978-0-8018-5913-7.
- Remini, Robert V. (1984). Andrew Jackson and the Course of American Democracy, 1833–1845. New York: Harper & Row Publishers, Inc. ISBN 978-0-8018-5913-7.
- Rosen, Jeffrey (2007). The Supreme Court: The Personalities and Rivalries That Defined America. New York: Henry Holt and Company. ISBN 978-1-4299-0461-2.
- Russell, Robert R. (1966). "Constitutional Doctrines with Regard to Slavery in Territories". Journal of Southern History. 32 (4): 466–486. doi:10.2307/2204926. JSTOR 2204926.
- Rutland, Robert Allen (1997). James Madison: The Founding Father. Columbia: University of Missouri Press. ISBN 978-0-8262-1141-5.
- Satz, Ronald N. (1974). American Indian Policy in the Jacksonian Era. Norman: University of Oklahoma Press. ISBN 978-0-8061-3432-1.
- Stagg, J.C.A. (2012). The War of 1812: Conflict for a Continent. Cambridge: Cambridge University Press. ISBN 978-0-521-89820-1.
- Varon, Elizabeth R. (2008). Disunion!: The Coming of the American Civil War, 1789–1859. Chapel Hill: University of North Carolina Press. ISBN 978-0-8078-8718-9.
- Wilentz, Sean (2006). The Rise of American Democracy: Jefferson to Lincoln. New York: W.W. Norton & Company. ISBN 0-393-05820-4.

=== Primary sources ===
- Calhoun, John Caldwell (1837). Speeches of Mr. Calhoun of S. Carolina, on the Bill for the Admission of Michigan: Delivered in the Senate of the United States, January, 1837.
- Calhoun, John C. (1870). Crallé, Richard K. (ed.). The Works of John C. Calhoun: Reports and public letters. New York: D. Appleton & Company.
- Calhoun, John C. (1992). Lence, Ross M. (ed.). Union and Liberty: The Political Philosophy of John C. Calhoun. Indianapolis: Liberty Fund. ISBN 0-86597-102-1.
- Calhoun, John C. (2017). Beck, Juergen (ed.). The Works of John C. Calhoun Volume 1. Jazzybee Verlag. ISBN 978-3-84967-688-9.
- Calhoun, John C. (2017). Beck, Juergen (ed.). The Works of John C. Calhoun Volume 2. Jazzybee Verlag. ISBN 978-3-84967-689-6.
- Calhoun, John Caldwell; Post, Charles Gordon (1995). A Disquisition on Government and Selections from the Discourse. Indianapolis: Hackett Publishing. ISBN 0-87220-293-3.
- Calhoun, John C. (1999). Wilson, Clyde N. (ed.). The Papers of John C. Calhoun, vol. 25. Columbia: University of South Carolina Press. ISBN 978-1-57003-306-3.
- Calhoun, John C. (2003). Wilson, Clyde N. (ed.). The Papers of John C. Calhoun, vol. 27. Columbia: University of South Carolina Press.
- Calhoun, John C. (2003). Cheek, Lee H. (ed.). John C. Calhoun: Selected Writings and Speeches. Washington, D.C.: Regnery Publishing. ISBN 0-89526-179-0.

U.S. House of Representatives
Preceded by Joseph Calhoun	Member of the U.S. House of Representatives from South Carolina's 6th congressional district 1811–1817	Succeeded by Eldred Simkins
Political offices
Preceded by George Graham; Acting	United States Secretary of War; 1817–1825	Succeeded by James Barbour
Preceded by Daniel D. Tompkins	Vice President of the United States; 1825–1832	Succeeded by Martin Van Buren
Preceded by Abel P. Upshur	United States Secretary of State; 1844–1845	Succeeded by James Buchanan
Party political offices
Preceded by Daniel D. Tompkins	Democratic-Republican nominee for Vice President of the United States¹; 1824; Served alongside: Albert Gallatin (withdrew), Nathaniel Macon, Nathan Sanford	Position abolished
New political party	Democratic nominee for Vice President of the United States; 1828	Succeeded by Martin Van Buren
U.S. Senate
Preceded by Robert Y. Hayne	U.S. Senator (Class 2) from South Carolina; 1832–1843; Served alongside: Stephen Miller, William C. Preston, George McDuffie	Succeeded by Daniel Elliott Huger
Preceded by Daniel Elliott Huger	U.S. Senator (Class 2) from South Carolina; 1845–1850; Served alongside: George McDuffie, Andrew Butler	Succeeded by Franklin H. Elmore
Preceded by Levi Woodbury	Chair of the Senate Finance Committee; 1845–1846	Succeeded by Dixon Hall Lewis
Notes and references
1. The Democratic-Republican Party split in the 1824 election, fielding four separate candidates.
