= Crisis in Kirkuk =

Academic book about Kirkuk

Crisis in Kirkuk: The Ethnopolitics of Conflict and Compromise
- Author: Liam Anderson, Gareth Stansfield
- Language: English
- Publisher: University of Pennsylvania Press
- Publication date: 2009
- ISBN: 978-0-8122-4176-1 (first edition)
- Dewey Decimal: 957.704431
- LC Class: DS79.9.K37 A53

Crisis in Kirkuk: The Ethnopolitics of Conflict and Compromise is an academic book by Liam Anderson and Gareth Stansfield, published in 2009 by the University of Pennsylvania Press.

== Content ==
The city of Kirkuk, the capital of the Kirkuk Governorate in Iraq, is the subject of this academic study because, according to the authors, "it is no exaggeration to assert that the future of Iraq hinges on finding a resolution to the problem of Kirkuks status in a way that is mutually tolerable to all parties". While Kirkuk in the latter years of the Iraqi conflict (2003–present) has not seen the widespread urban warfare of other cities or "large-scale interethnic violence", one reviewer of the book noted that "it is consistently described as a powder keg, and its future is often portrayed as crucial to the very survival of Iraq as a single state.

Kurds, Arabs, and Turkmen all share this city (with Christians as a fourth group, though a small one); Anderson and Stansfield maintain that it is not (just) the area's rich oil reserves that fuel its conflict (a view they contend is reductionist), but also, and more importantly, competing narratives about history from competing populations.

The book is divided into four parts: the history of Kirkuk, the competing historical narratives, the struggle for Kirkuk post-2003 and the rise and fall of Kurdish power, and finally the causes for and results of the Kurdish refusal to enact Article 140 of the 2005 Constitution of Iraq.

Michael Gunter, who reviewed the book for Perspectives on Politics, noted two levels of reading. The first is "as an important but nuanced analysis of the crisis in Kirkuk and how it will affect the future of Iraq", but Gunter was drawn more to what he saw as the second level, which treated the history of Kirkuk as a case study "for theories of democratic governance and its efficiency".

Four models for governance are proposed:

- on one extreme end is the Israeli model which "explains how Israel is able to control its sizable Arab minority population without allowing it to share power";
- more in the middle is a model in which two groups alternate power;
- closely followed by a model in which populations are proportionally represented based on size;
- And on the other extreme is a model where all populations are equally powerful despite size—the model of concurrent majority that John C. Calhoun had advocated for, in which nothing can happen unless all groups approve.

== Criticism ==
Michiel Leezenburg, of the University of Amsterdam, criticized the book for having too rigid a view of the categories of the various peoples in and around Kirkuk, and failing to account for the "vagaries of local political alliances" and "the ambiguity of local ethnic identities", especially of minority groups of Shiites who have been ambivalent with their political loyalties. According to Leezenburg, the authors "largely overlook the fact that ethnic identities here, as elsewhere, are rather more flexible and negotiated than nationalist rhetoric would have it", though he did conclude that "the book is a useful addition to the--regrettably scant--academic literature on the complexities of post-Saddam Iraq's politics".

Michael M. Gunter, of Tennessee Tech University, suggested in his 2011 review that the book could already do with an updated second edition. Gunter also noted that the book lacks a bibliography (though he said "the copious notes indicating largely journalistic and broadcast media sources certainly imply a bibliography"), but notes that the journalistic sources indicate the book's originality, and praised the book as an "important and dispassionate study".

== Authors ==
- Liam Anderson is a professor in the School of Public and International Affairs at Wright State University
- Gareth Stansfield is a professor of Middle East Politics at the University of Exeter
