= Patrick Calhoun (immigrant) =

Irish-born American politician (1727–1796)

- Born: June 11, 1727; County Donegal, Kingdom of Ireland
- Died: January 15, 1796 (aged 68)
- Occupation: politician
- Children: 5, including John C. Calhoun

Patrick Calhoun (11 June 1727 – 15 January 1796) was an Irish-born American politician who was born in County Donegal, Ireland, but emigrated to the British colony of Virginia with his parents in 1733, and from there the family made their way to the Province of South Carolina. According to A Compendium of Irish Biography (1878):

He and his family suffered severely during the war with the French and the Indians. Shortly after the peace of 1763 he was elected a member of the provincial legislature, and continued as a member of that and afterward of the state legislature (with the intermission of a single term) till his death in 1796. In the war of the Revolution, he took an early, decided, and active part against the British. His son John Caldwell Calhoun (born in South Carolina in 1782, died in Washington on March 31, 1850) was Vice-President of the United States from 1825 to 1832, and held other important offices, and was undoubtedly the ablest and most uncompromising champion of slavery and the slave power in his day.

His great-grandson and namesake was the entrepreneur Patrick Calhoun.
