= Margaret Coit =

American historian

- Born: Margaret Louise Coit; May 30, 1919; Norwich, Connecticut
- Died: March 15, 2003 (aged 83); Amesbury, Massachusetts
- Other name: Margaret Louise Elwell
- Occupation: Writer

Margaret Louise Coit (Margaret Louise Elwell) (May 30, 1919 in Norwich, Connecticut - March 15, 2003 in Amesbury, Massachusetts) was a writer of American history books for both adults and children. In 1935 when she was still in high school in Greensboro, North Carolina, Coit—like many people in the South at that time—venerated John C. Calhoun. In her eyes his life was heroic. Calhoun was "a congressman and vice president under two presidents" and "later a symbol of the lost cause of defending slavery." After studying journalism and history for several years at the Woman's College at Greensboro, she worked for many years researching Calhoun's life, resulting in the publication of her Pulitzer Prize-winning book entitled John C. Calhoun, American Portrait.

== Early life and education ==
Coit was born in Connecticut to Grace Trow, the principal of a private day school, and Archa Willoughby Coit, a stockbroker. Two years later, Margaret's sister Grace was born with Down syndrome; caring for Grace would take up much of Coit's adult life.

At the start of the Great Depression, Coit's family moved to Greensboro, North Carolina, where Coit attended Curry School, a training school located on the grounds of Woman's College (now The University of North Carolina at Greensboro). Coit graduated Curry School in 1937 and went on to study history and English at Woman's College, where she edited the college magazine, wrote for the school paper, and studied with professors such as Caroline Tate and Mildred Gould.

== Career ==
Meanwhile, Coit's parents had moved to West Newbury, Massachusetts, and after graduating in 1941, she moved north to work as a reporter for the newspapers of surrounding towns—the Lawrence Daily Eagle, Newburyport Daily News, and Haverhill Gazette.

=== Biography of John C. Calhoun ===
Over the next nine years, Coit also performed extensive research on South Carolina statesman John C. Calhoun, in whom she had developed an interest while still a school child at Curry. John C. Calhoun, American Portrait was published by Houghton Mifflin to critical acclaim in 1950, winning the 1951 Pulitzer Prize for Biography or Autobiography.

As a result of the critical acclaim for John C. Calhoun, Coit won a staff appointment to the University of New Hampshire Writers Conference, where she met Lloyd Haberly, a poet and the new dean of Fairleigh Dickinson University. Haberly invited Coit to teach at the university's Rutherford branch, where she began as a visiting writer in the English department in 1950, then became a professor of social science. Over the next decade Coit would also teach at the University of Colorado at Boulder and Bread Loaf Writers' Conferences, and write articles and reviews for various national publications including Look, the Saturday Review, The Nation, and American Heritage. In 1959 Woman's College bestowed upon Coit an honorary Doctor of Letters.

In 1970 Coit was recruited to edit Calhoun: Great Lives Observed. In 1977 Phi Alpha Theta conferred membership upon her for "conspicuous attainments and scholarship in the field of history."

=== Biography of Bernard Baruch ===
Coit's treatment of Calhoun also drew the attention of Bernard Baruch, who requested she write his biography next. Coit spent seven years working closely with Baruch, combing through his personal papers and interviewing his associates, among them top political figures of the day. Unfortunately, Baruch did not agree with the final product, and withdrew permission to quote from his personal papers and friends. However, the attorneys at Houghton Mifflin gave the go-ahead, and Mr. Baruch was published in 1957. It was named a Book of the Month selection by the National Council of Women in 1958. Although Baruch later extended an olive branch to Coit, her negative experience with writing a biography of a living person caused her to refuse to do so ever again; she even turned down an invitation to write the life story of Eleanor Roosevelt, whom she greatly admired.

=== Date with John F. Kennedy ===
In a June 1966 interview with Charles T. Morrissey Coit described how during her first trip in the spring of 1953 to New York to interview senators for her biography on Bernard Baruch, at the age of 34, she met then-senator John F. Kennedy, one month before his engagement to Jacqueline Bouvier.

Coit admitted to Morrissey:

I had designs on John F. Kennedy. Everybody in Massachusetts did. We had a Kennedy legend then which was not like the legend you have now, but there was definitely a Kennedy legend. We didn’t know much about him, but he was the golden boy, the most eligible bachelor in New England. Every girl in Massachusetts wanted to date him, and I wasn’t any exception. I thought up what possible excuse I would have to meet him, to interview him...

— Margaret Coit in an interview with Charles T. Morrissey, June 1966

But then the date went terribly, with Kennedy forcing her to kiss him, treating her aggressively until she finally got away from him.

=== Time-Life series on United States history ===
In 1963 she published "The Growing Years: 1789-1829" and "The Sweep Westward" as part of a Time-Life series on United States history.

=== Historical fiction for children ===
In the 1960s Coit found success writing historical non-fiction for children. In 1961 her Fight for Union won the Thomas Edison Award, and she followed that up with Andrew Jackson in 1965 and Massachusetts in 1967. She did not stick strictly to the youth market, however, and also managed to contribute two volumes, entitled The Growing Years: 1789-1829 and The Sweep Westward, to a Time-Life series on United States history, both in 1963. During this time, Coit also traveled overseas for the first time. In the summer of 1964, she sailed to the United Kingdom to deliver talks on the American political scene.

In 1978 Coit married farmer and politician Albert Elwell, whom she had first met at a West Newbury town meeting in 1954, and moved to Strawberry Hill Farm, where she helped with the farming. Although almost 80 years old, Elwell remained active in local politics, and Coit (now Margaret Coit Elwell) served as moderator at town meetings.

== Later life and death ==
Although Coit did not publish any books in the 1980s, she continually researched and wrote about topics that interested her. She worked on an adult-level book about Andrew Jackson, and spent years developing a book entitled The South Joins the Union; though it was never finished, she did teach a course of that same name in 1981. In 1984 Margaret was given the Rutherford Campus Faculty Award to recognize her years of teaching at Fairleigh Dickinson University. Soon after, she retired in order to find work closer to home, and from 1985 to 1987 she taught a course on the American presidency at Bunker Hill Community College in Charlestown.

Margaret Coit died in 2003 in Amesbury, Massachusetts.
