= William W. Freehling =

American historian (born 1935)

- Born: William Wilhartz Freehling; December 26, 1935 (age 90); Chicago, Illinois
- Education: Harvard College; University of California, Berkeley
- Occupation: Historian
- Spouses: Natalie Paperno (m. 1961; div. 1970) Alison Goodyear (m. 1971)
- Children: 4

William Wilhartz Freehling (born December 26, 1935) is an American historian, and Singletary Professor of the Humanities Emeritus at the University of Kentucky.

== Early life ==
Freehling was born in Chicago, Illinois on December 26, 1935, a son of Norman Freehling and Edna (née Wilhartz) Freehling. He received his undergraduate degree from Harvard College, graduating Phi Beta Kappa in 1958. He wrote his undergraduate honors thesis under noted U.S. historian Arthur M. Schlesinger Jr. He received his M.A. in 1959 and his Ph.D. in 1964, from the University of California, Berkeley, with historian Kenneth M. Stampp serving as his dissertation supervisor.

== Career ==
Freehling taught at Berkeley, Harvard, the University of Michigan, and Johns Hopkins University. He also held endowed chairs at SUNY Buffalo and Kentucky.

Freehling has written several well-respected works on the American South during the antebellum era and on the American Civil War. His most notable book, Prelude to Civil War: The Nullification Controversy in South Carolina, won the 1967 Bancroft Prize.

As of 2011, he was senior fellow at the Virginia Foundation for the Humanities.

== Personal life ==
On January 27, 1961, Freehling married Natalie Paperno, with whom he had two children, Alan and Deborah Freehling. Freehling and Natalie divorced in 1970, and on June 19, 1971, Freehling married historian Alison Harrison (née Goodyear) Bradshaw. The former wife of William Emmons Bradshaw, she was a daughter of Frank H. Goodyear Jr. and a granddaughter of lumber baron Frank H. Goodyear and Edmund P. Rogers. Together, they are the parents of two children, Alison and William Freehling.

== Awards ==
- 1965 Allan Nevins Prize of the Society of American Historians
- 1967 Bancroft Prize
- Senior Fellow at the Virginia Foundation for the Humanities
- 2007 Louis R. Gottschalk Lecture

== Works ==
- The Road to Disunion: Volume I: Secessionists at Bay, 1776-1854. Oxford University Press. 1991. ISBN 978-0-19-507259-4.
- William W. Freehling; Craig M. Simpson, eds. (1992). Secession Debated: Georgia's Showdown in 1860. Oxford University Press. ISBN 978-0-19-507945-6.
- Prelude to Civil War: The Nullification Controversy in South Carolina, 1816-1836. Oxford University Press. 1992. ISBN 978-0-19-507681-3.
- The Reintegration of American History: Slavery and the Civil War. Oxford University Press. 1994. ISBN 978-0-19-508808-3. (collection of articles and essays)
- "The Divided South, Democracy's Limitations, and the Causes of the Peculiarly North American Civil War", in Gabor Boritt, ed. (1996). Why the Civil War Came. Oxford University Press. ISBN 0-19-507941-8.
- "The Civil War: Repressible or Irrepressible" (with Allan Nevins), in Francis G. Couvares, George Athan Billias, Martha Saxton, eds., Interpretations of American History: Through Reconstruction. Simon & Schuster, 2000. ISBN 978-0-684-86773-1
- The South vs. the South: How Anti-Confederate Southerners Shaped the Course of the Civil War. Oxford University Press, 2001
- The Road to Disunion: Volume II: Secessionists Triumphant, 1854-1861. Oxford University Press. 2007. ISBN 978-0-19-505815-4.
- "Arthur Schlesinger Jr: William W. Freehling Remembers", OUPblog Oxford University Press website
- William W. Freehling; Craig M. Simpson, eds. (2010). Showdown in Virginia: The 1861 Convention and the Fate of the Union. University of Virginia Press. ISBN 978-0-813-92991-0.
- Becoming Lincoln. University of Virginia Press (2018). ISBN 978-0-813-94156-1
