= Irving H. Bartlett =

American historian

Irving Henry Bartlett
- Born: 1923
- Died: July 1, 2006 (aged 82–83); Hingham, Massachusetts
- Education: Ohio Wesleyan University, Brown University
- Occupation: Historian
- Known for: John F. Kennedy Professor of American Civilization at University of Massachusetts Boston
- Awards: Guggenheim Fellowship (1966)

Irving Henry Bartlett (1923 – July 1, 2006) was an American historian.

After graduating from Ohio Wesleyan University, Bartlett obtained his master's and doctoral degrees at Brown University. He taught at Cape Cod Community College, the Rhode Island College of Education, and the Massachusetts Institute of Technology before joining the University of Massachusetts Boston, where he was the John F. Kennedy Professor of American Civilization. Bartlett was awarded a Guggenheim Fellowship in 1966. He died in Hingham, Massachusetts on July 1, 2006, aged 83.
