= Presidency of Andrew Jackson =

U.S. presidential administration from 1829 to 1837

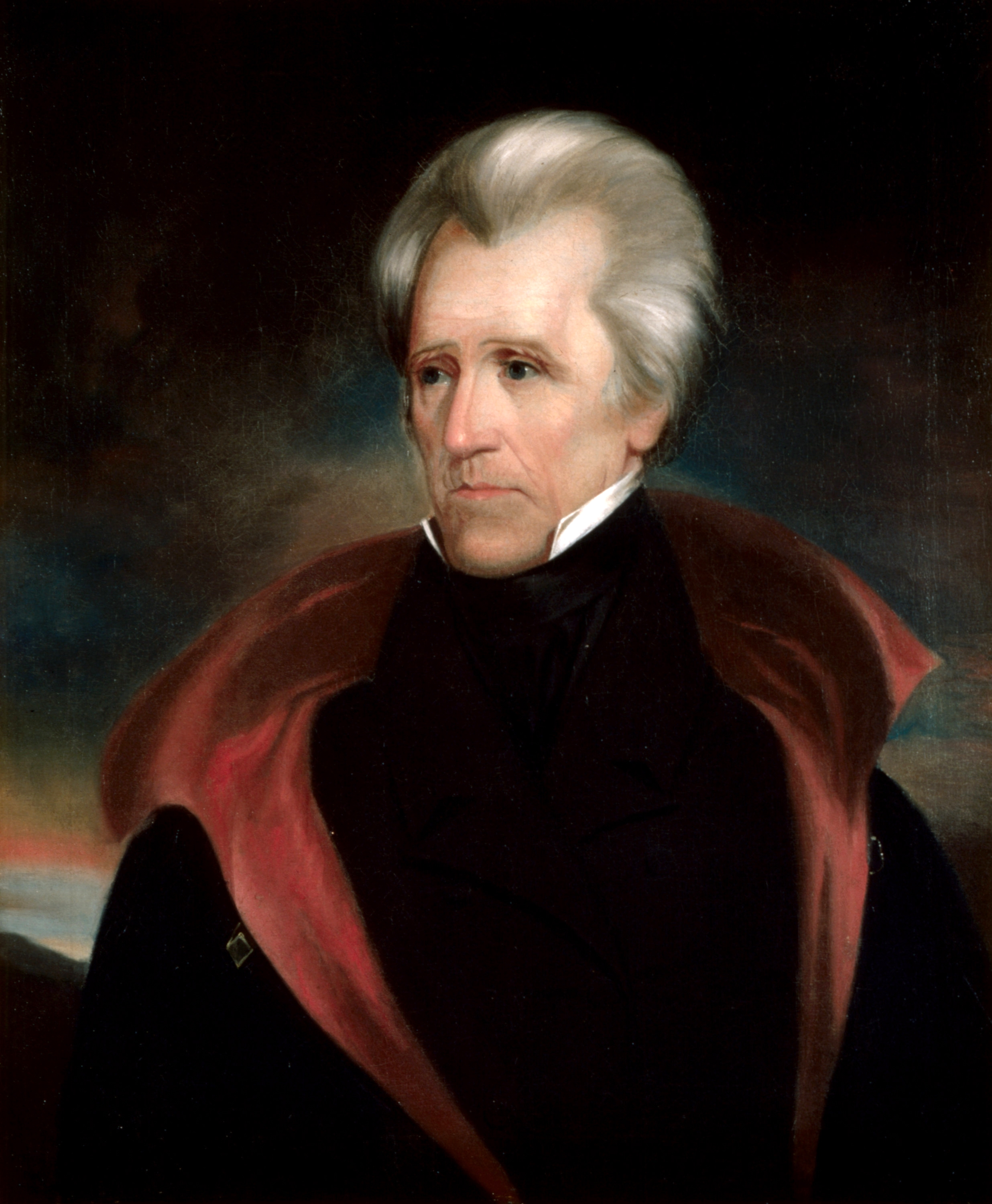
- Presidency of Andrew Jackson; March 4, 1829 – March 4, 1837
- Vice President: John C. Calhoun (1829–1832); None (1832–1833) (Note: Vice President Calhoun resigned from office. As this was prior to the adoption of the Twenty-fifth Amendment in 1967, a vacancy in the office of vice president was not filled until the next ensuing election and inauguration.); Martin Van Buren (1833–1837)
- Cabinet: See list
- Party: Democratic
- Election: 1828; 1832
- Seat: White House
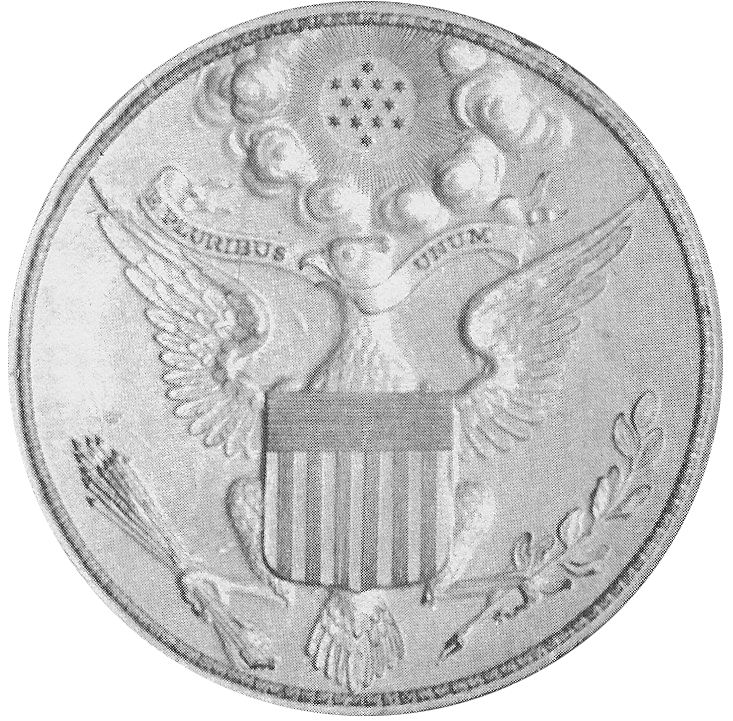
- Dorsett seal

Andrew Jackson was the seventh president of the United States from March 4, 1829, to March 4, 1837. Jackson took office after defeating John Quincy Adams, the incumbent president, in the bitterly contested 1828 presidential election. During the 1828 presidential campaign, Jackson founded the political force that coalesced into the Democratic Party during Jackson's presidency. Jackson won re-election in 1832, defeating National Republican candidate Henry Clay by a wide margin. He was succeeded by his hand-picked successor and vice president, Martin Van Buren, who won the 1836 presidential election.

Jackson's presidency saw several important developments in domestic policy. A strong supporter of the removal of Native American tribes from U.S. territory east of the Mississippi River, Jackson began the process of forced relocation known as the "Trail of Tears". He instituted the spoils system for federal government positions, using his patronage powers to build a powerful and united Democratic Party. In response to the nullification crisis, Jackson threatened to send federal soldiers into South Carolina, but the crisis was defused by the passage of the Tariff of 1833. He engaged in a long struggle with the Second Bank of the United States, which he viewed as an anti-democratic bastion of elitism. Jackson emerged triumphant in the "Bank War" and the federal charter of the Second Bank of the United States expired in 1836. The destruction of the bank and Jackson's hard money policies would contribute to the Panic of 1837. Foreign affairs were less eventful than domestic affairs during Jackson's presidency, but Jackson pursued numerous commercial treaties with foreign powers and recognized the independence of the Republic of Texas.

Jackson was the most influential and controversial political figure of the 1830s, and his two terms as president set the tone for the quarter-century era of American public discourse known as the Jacksonian Era. Historian James Sellers has stated that "Andrew Jackson's masterful personality was enough by itself to make him one of the most controversial figures ever to stride across the American stage". His actions encouraged his political opponents to coalesce into the Whig Party, which advocated for a stronger federal role in shaping the economy through centralized banking, protective tariffs on manufactured imports, and federally funded infrastructure like canals and harbors. Of all presidential reputations, Jackson's is perhaps the most difficult to summarize or explain. A generation after his presidency, biographer James Parton found his reputation a mass of contradictions: "he was dictator or democrat, ignoramus or genius, Satan or saint". Thirteen polls of historians and political scientists taken between 1948 and 2009 ranked Jackson always in or near the top ten presidents, although more recent polls have tended to place him in the teens or lower.

== Election of 1828 ==
"Some account of the bloody deeds of General Andrew Jackson," c. 1828

The 1828 election was a rematch between Jackson and John Quincy Adams, who had faced–off against each other four years earlier in the 1824 presidential election. Jackson had won a plurality, but not the required majority, of the electoral vote in the 1824 election, while Adams, Secretary of War William H. Crawford, and Speaker of the House Henry Clay also received a significant share of the vote. Under the rules of the Twelfth Amendment, the U.S. House of Representatives held a contingent election. The House elected Adams as president. Jackson denounced the House vote as the result of an alleged "corrupt bargain" between Adams and Clay, who became Adams's Secretary of State after the latter succeeded outgoing President James Monroe in March 1825.

Jackson was nominated for president by the Tennessee legislature in October 1825, more than three years before the 1828 election. It was the earliest such nomination in presidential history, and it attested to the fact that Jackson's supporters began the 1828 campaign almost as soon as the 1824 campaign ended. Adams's presidency floundered, as his ambitious agenda faced defeat in a new era of mass politics. Critics led by Jackson attacked Adams's policies as a dangerous expansion of federal power. Senator Martin Van Buren, who had been a prominent supporter of Crawford in the 1824 election, emerged as one of the strongest opponents of Adams's policies, and he settled on Jackson as his preferred candidate in the 1828 election. Jackson also won the support of Vice President John C. Calhoun, who opposed much of Adams's agenda on states' rights grounds. Van Buren and other Jackson allies established numerous pro-Jackson newspapers and clubs around the country, while Jackson made himself available to visitors at his Hermitage plantation.

1828 election results

The 1828 campaign was very much a personal one. As was the custom at the time, neither candidate personally campaigned, but their political followers organized many campaign events. Jackson was attacked as a slave trader, and his conduct was attacked in pamphlets such as the Coffin Handbills. Rachel Jackson was also a frequent target of attacks, and was widely accused of bigamy, a reference to the controversial situation of her marriage with Jackson.

Despite the attacks, in the 1828 election, Jackson won a commanding 56 percent of the popular vote and 68 percent of the electoral vote, carrying most states outside of New England. Concurrent congressional elections also gave Jackson's allies nominal majorities in both houses of Congress, although many of those who campaigned as supporters of Jackson would diverge from Jackson during his presidency. The 1828 election marked the definitive end of the one-party "Era of Good Feelings", as the Democratic-Republican Party broke apart. Jackson's supporters coalesced into the Democratic Party, while Adams's followers became known as the National Republicans. Rachel had begun experiencing significant physical stress during the election season, and she died of a heart attack on December 22, 1828, three weeks after her husband's victory in the election. Jackson felt that the accusations from Adams's supporters had hastened her death, and he never forgave Adams. "May God Almighty forgive her murderers", Jackson swore at her funeral. "I never can."

== First inauguration ==
Jackson's first inauguration, on March 4, 1829, was the first time in which the ceremony was held on the East Portico of the United States Capitol. Due to the acrimonious campaign and mutual antipathy, Adams did not attend Jackson's inauguration. Ten thousand people arrived in town for the ceremony, eliciting this response from Francis Scott Key: "It is beautiful; it is sublime!" Jackson was the first president to invite the public to attend the White House inaugural ball. Many poor people came to the inaugural ball in their homemade clothes and rough-hewn manners. The crowd became so large that the guards could not keep them out of the White House, which became so crowded with people that dishes and decorative pieces inside were broken. Jackson's raucous populism earned him the nickname "King Mob". Though numerous political disagreements had marked Adams's presidency and would continue during his own presidency, Jackson took office at a time when no major economic or foreign policy crisis faced the United States. He announced no clear policy goals in the months before Congress convened in December 1829, save for his desire to pay down the national debt.

== Philosophy and personality ==
Jackson's name has been associated with Jacksonian democracy or the shift and expansion of democracy as political power shifted from established elites to ordinary voters based in political parties. "The Age of Jackson" shaped the national agenda and American politics. Jackson's philosophy as president was similar to that of Thomas Jefferson, as he advocated republican values held by the Revolutionary War generation. He believed in the ability of the people to "arrive at right conclusions," and he thought that they should have the right not only to elect but also to "instruct their agents & representatives." He rejected the need for a powerful and independent Supreme Court, arguing that "the Congress, the Executive, and the Court must each or itself be guided by its own opinions of the Constitution." Jackson thought that Supreme Court justices should be made to stand for election, and believed in strict constructionism as the best way to ensure democratic rule.

Much has been said regarding Jackson's personality, he has variously been described as a tyrant, patriot, barbarian and statesman before and after his death. Accounts from contemporaries of his era similarly follow divergent opinions on him depending on whether they were ally or foe to Jackson. In Age of Jackson, Schlesinger describes Andrew Jackson during his presidency:

By 1829 he was technically a sick man-many thought dying. His head throbbed with splitting pains apparently produced by years of tobacco chewing, and his lean frame shook with a hacking consumptive cough. Yet, while his face grew whiter and more haggard, his spirit was grim and indomitable. At White House receptions he remained urbane, though reserved and somewhat formal. Among his intimates he cast off his gravity, becoming sociable and sympathetic. He smoked with fierce energy, usually an old Powhatan bowl pipe with a long stem which he rested on his crossed legs, while he puffed out great white clouds until the whole room was "so obfuscated that one could hardly breathe." Or, after the Tennessee custom, he would chew and spit at regular intervals, while carrying on conversation or even conducting the affairs of state. He spoke quickly and forcibly, often emphasizing his points by raising a clenched hand in a brief, sharp gesture. "He obviously had a hidden vein of humor," reported Henry A. Wise, for many years a bitter foe, "loved aphorism, and could politely convey a sense of smart travesty. If put upon his mettle, he was very positive, but gravely respectful." When his mind was made up, he would draw down the left corner of his mouth, giving his face, as one observer noted, "a peculiar 'G-d damn me' expression." But he was not particularly dogmatic. Though accustomed to maintain his own position with pertinacity, he yielded gracefully when convinced of his error.

== Administration and cabinet ==
Jackson cabinet
Office	Name	Term
President	Andrew Jackson	1829–1837
Vice President	John C. Calhoun	1829–1832
none	1832–1833
Martin Van Buren	1833–1837
Secretary of State	Martin Van Buren	1829–1831
Edward Livingston	1831–1833
Louis McLane	1833–1834
John Forsyth	1834–1837
Secretary of the Treasury	Samuel D. Ingham	1829–1831
Louis McLane	1831–1833
William J. Duane	1833
Roger B. Taney	1833–1834
Levi Woodbury	1834–1837
Secretary of War	John Eaton	1829–1831
Lewis Cass	1831–1836
Attorney General	John M. Berrien	1829–1831
Roger B. Taney	1831–1833
Benjamin Franklin Butler	1833–1837
Postmaster General	William T. Barry	1829–1835
Amos Kendall	1835–1837
Secretary of the Navy	John Branch	1829–1831
Levi Woodbury	1831–1834
Mahlon Dickerson	1834–1837

Instead of choosing party leaders for his cabinet, Jackson chose "plain businessmen" whom he intended to control. For the key positions of Secretary of State and Secretary of the Treasury, Jackson chose two Northerners, Martin Van Buren of New York and Samuel Ingham of Pennsylvania. He appointed John Branch of North Carolina as Secretary of the Navy, John Macpherson Berrien of Georgia as Attorney General, and John Eaton of Tennessee, a friend and close political ally, as Secretary of War. Recognizing the growing importance of the Post Office, Jackson elevated the position of Postmaster General to the cabinet, and he named William T. Barry of Kentucky to lead the department. Of the six officials in Jackson's initial cabinet, only Van Buren was a major political figure in his own right. Jackson's cabinet choices were criticized from various quarters; Calhoun and Van Buren were both disappointed that their respective factions were not more prominent in the cabinet, while leaders from the state of Virginia and the region of New England complained about their exclusion. In addition to his official cabinet, Jackson would come to rely on an informal "Kitchen Cabinet" of advisers, including General William Berkeley Lewis and journalist Amos Kendall. Jackson's nephew, Andrew Jackson Donelson, served as the president's personal secretary, and wife, Emily, acted as the White House hostess.

Jackson's inaugural cabinet suffered from bitter partisanship and gossip, especially between Eaton, Vice President John C. Calhoun, and Van Buren. By mid-1831, all except Barry (and Calhoun) had resigned. Governor Lewis Cass of the Michigan Territory became Secretary of War, ambassador and former Congressman Louis McLane of Delaware took the position of Secretary of the Treasury, Senator Edward Livingston of Louisiana became Secretary of State, and Senator Levi Woodbury of New Hampshire became Secretary of the Navy. Roger Taney, who had previously served as the Attorney General of Maryland, replaced Berrien as the U.S. Attorney General. In contrast to Jackson's initial choices, the cabinet members appointed in 1831 were prominent national leaders, none of whom were aligned with Calhoun. Outside of the cabinet, journalist Francis Preston Blair emerged as an influential adviser.

At the start of his second term, Jackson transferred McLane to the position of Secretary of State, while William J. Duane replaced McLane as Secretary of the Treasury and Livingston became the ambassador to France. Due to his opposition to Jackson's removal of federal funds from the Second Bank of the United States, Duane was dismissed from the cabinet before the end of 1833. Taney became the new Secretary of the Treasury, while Benjamin F. Butler replaced Taney as Attorney General. Jackson was forced to shake up his cabinet again in 1834 after the Senate rejected Taney's nomination and McLane resigned. John Forsyth of Georgia was appointed Secretary of State, Mahlon Dickerson replaced Woodbury as Secretary of the Navy, and Woodbury became the fourth and final Secretary of the Treasury under Jackson. Jackson dismissed Barry in 1835 after numerous complaints about the latter's effectiveness as Postmaster General, and Jackson chose Amos Kendall as Barry's replacement.

== Judicial appointments ==
Jackson appointed six Justices to the Supreme Court of the United States. Most were undistinguished. His first nominee was John McLean, a close ally of Calhoun's who had been Adams's Postmaster General. Because McLean was reluctant to make full use of his office's powers of patronage, Jackson delicately removed him from office with an appointment to the Supreme Court. McLean "turned Whig and forever schemed to win" the presidency. Jackson's next two appointees–Henry Baldwin and James Moore Wayne–disagreed with Jackson on some points but were poorly regarded even by Jackson's enemies. In reward for his services, Jackson nominated Taney to the Court to fill a vacancy in January 1835, but the nomination failed to win Senate approval. Chief Justice John Marshall died later that year, leaving two vacancies on the court. Jackson nominated Taney for Chief Justice and Philip P. Barbour for Associate Justice, and both were confirmed by the new Senate. Taney served as Chief Justice until 1864, presiding over a court that upheld many of the precedents set by the Marshall Court. On the last full day of his presidency, Jackson nominated John Catron, who was confirmed. By the time Jackson left office, he had appointed a majority of the sitting members of the Supreme Court, the only exceptions being Joseph Story and Smith Thompson. Jackson also appointed eighteen judges to the United States district courts.

== Petticoat affair ==
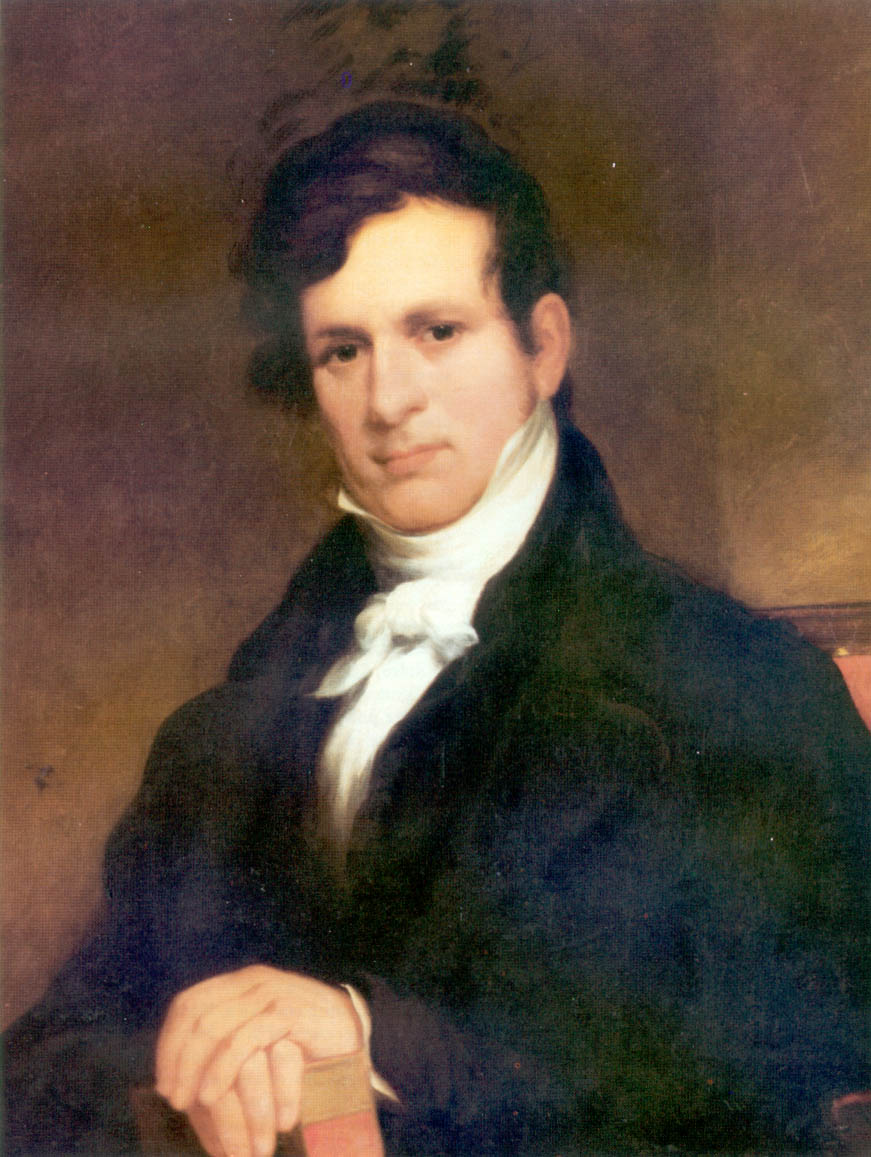
Secretary of War John Eaton

Jackson devoted a considerable amount of his time during his early years in office responding to what came to be known as the "Petticoat affair" or "Eaton affair." Washington gossip circulated among Jackson's cabinet members and their wives, including Vice President Calhoun's wife Floride Calhoun, concerning Secretary of War Eaton and his wife Peggy Eaton. Salacious rumors held that Peggy, as a barmaid in her father's tavern, had been sexually promiscuous or had even been a prostitute. Some also accused the Eatons of having engaged in an adulterous affair while Peggy's previous husband, John B. Timberlake, was still living. Petticoat politics emerged when the wives of cabinet members, led by Floride Calhoun, refused to socialize with the Eatons. The cabinet wives insisted that the interests and honor of all American women were at stake. They believed a responsible woman should never accord a man sexual favors without the assurance that went with marriage. Historian Daniel Walker Howe argues that the actions of the cabinet wives reflected the feminist spirit that in the next decade shaped the woman's rights movement.

Jackson refused to believe the rumors regarding Peggy Eaton, telling his cabinet that "She is as chaste as a virgin!" He was infuriated by those who, in attempting to drive the Eatons out, dared to tell him who he could and could not have in his cabinet. The affair also reminded him of similar attacks that had been made against his wife. Though he initially blamed Henry Clay for the controversy over Eaton, by the end of 1829 Jackson had come to believe that Vice President Calhoun had masterminded the dissension in his cabinet. The controversy over Eaton dragged on into 1830 and 1831, as the other cabinet wives continued to ostracize Eaton. Jackson's cabinet and closest advisers became polarized between Vice President Calhoun and Secretary of State Van Buren, a widower who remained on good terms with the Eatons. In early 1831, as the controversy continued unabated, Van Buren proposed that the entire cabinet resign, and the Petticoat Affair finally ended after Eaton stepped down in June 1831. With the sole exception of Postmaster General Barry, the other cabinet officials also left office, marking the first mass resignation of cabinet officials in U.S. history.

Van Buren was rewarded with a nomination to the position of ambassador to Great Britain, but the Senate rejected his nomination. Calhoun, who cast a tie-breaking vote in the Senate to defeat Van Buren's nomination, believed that the Senate vote would end Van Buren's career, but in fact it strengthened Van Buren's position with Jackson and many other Democrats. By cultivating the support of Jackson, Van Buren emerged from the Petticoat Affair as Jackson's heir apparent. Three decades later, biographer James Parton would write that "the political history of the United States, for the last thirty years, dates from the moment when the soft hand of Mr. Van Buren touched Mrs. Eaton's knocker." Meanwhile, Jackson and Vice President Calhoun became increasingly alienated from one another. Following the Petticoat Affair, Jackson acquired the Globe newspaper to use as a weapon against the rumor mills.

== Rotation in office and spoils system ==
Jackson removed an unprecedented number of presidential appointees from office, though Thomas Jefferson had dismissed a smaller but still significant number of Federalists during his own presidency. Jackson believed that a rotation in office (the removal of governmental officials) was actually a democratic reform preventing nepotism, and that it made civil service responsible to the popular will. Reflecting this view, Jackson told Congress in December 1829, "In a country where offices are created solely for the benefit of the people, no one man has any more intrinsic right to official station than another." Jackson rotated about 20% of federal office holders during his first term, some for dereliction of duty rather than political purposes. The Post Office was most strongly affected by Jackson's rotation policy, but district attorneys, federal marshals, customs collectors, and other federal employees were also removed from office.

Jackson's opponents labeled his appointments process a "spoils system", arguing that he was primarily motivated by a desire to use government positions to reward supporters and build his own political strength. Because he believed that most public officials faced few challenges for their positions, Jackson dismissed the need for a meritocratic appointment policy. Many of Jackson's appointees, including Amos Kendall and Isaac Hill, were controversial, and many of those who Jackson removed from office were popular. Jackson's appointment policy also created political problems within his own coalition, as Calhoun, Van Buren, Eaton, and others clashed over various appointments. His appointments encountered some resistance in the Senate, and by the end of his presidency, Jackson had had more nominees rejected than all previous presidents combined.

In an effort to purge the government from the alleged corruption of previous administrations, Jackson launched presidential investigations into all executive cabinet offices and departments. His administration conducted a high-profile prosecution against Tobias Watkins, the Auditor at the Treasury Department during Adams's presidency. John Neal, a friend of Watkins and critic of Jackson, said that this prosecution served to "feed fat his ancient grudge" and was "characteristic of that willful, unforgiving, inexorable man, who was made President by the war-cry." Jackson's approach incorporated patriotism for country as qualification for holding office. Having appointed a soldier who had lost his leg fighting on the battlefield to postmaster, he stated, "[i]f he lost his leg fighting for his country, that is ... enough for me."

He also asked Congress to reform embezzlement laws, reduce fraudulent applications for federal pensions, and pass laws to prevent evasion of custom duties and improve government accounting. Despite these attempts at reform, historians believe Jackson's presidency marked the beginning of an era of decline in public ethics. Supervision of bureaus and departments whose operations were outside of Washington, such as the New York Customs House, the Postal Service, and the Bureau of Indian Affairs proved to be difficult. However, some of the practices that later became associated with the spoils system, including the buying of offices, forced political party campaign participation, and collection of assessments, did not take place until after Jackson's presidency. Eventually, in the years after Jackson left office, presidents would remove appointees as a matter of course; while Jackson dismissed 45 percent of those who held office, Abraham Lincoln would dismiss 90 percent of those who had held office prior to the start of his presidency.

== Indian removal ==
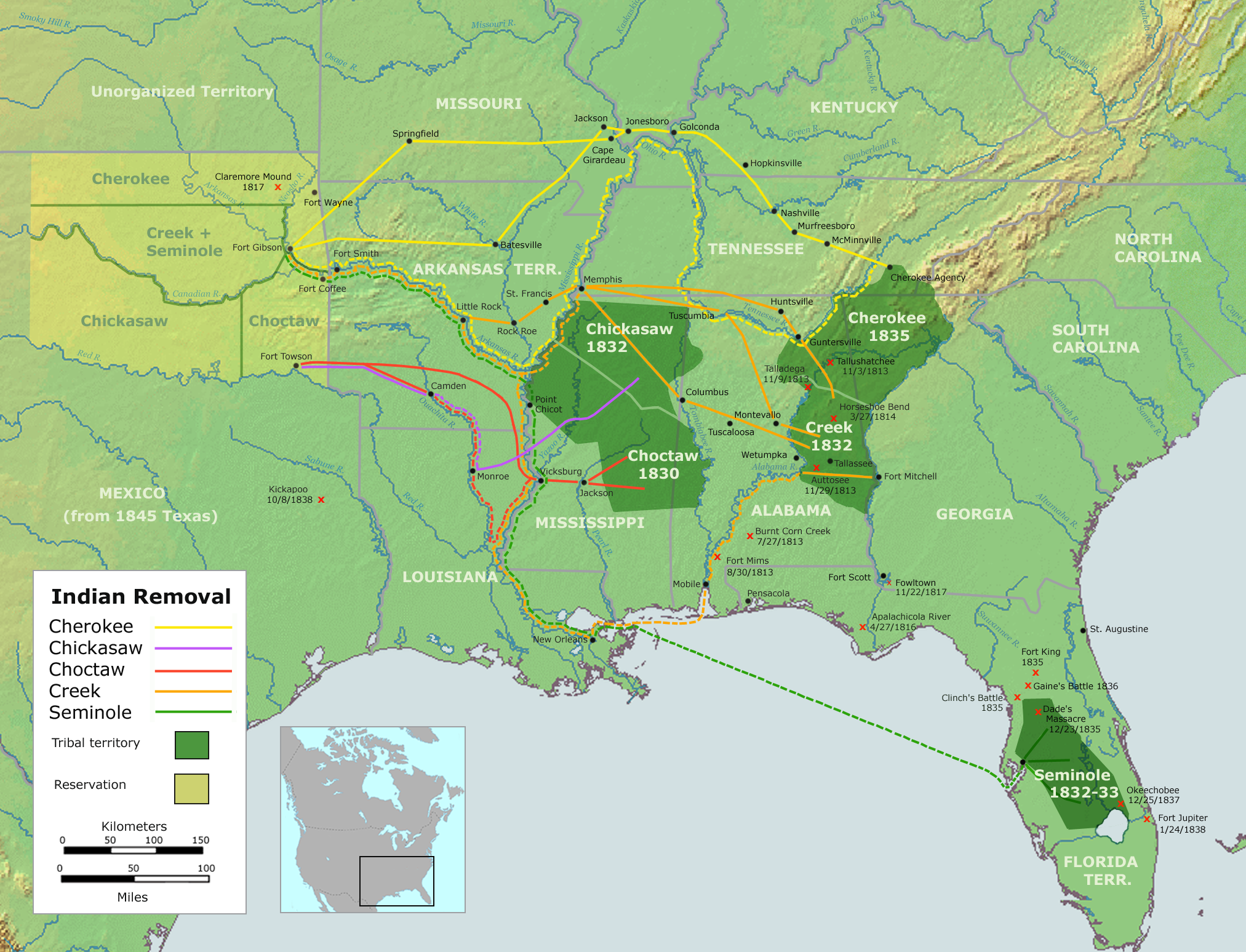
Jackson's Indian Removal Act and subsequent treaties resulted in the forced removal of several Indian tribes from their traditional territories, including the Trail of Tears.

=== Indian Removal Act ===
Prior to taking office, Jackson had spent much of his career fighting the Native Americans of the Southwest, and he considered Native Americans to be inferior to those who were descended from Europeans. His presidency marked a new era in Native American-Anglo American relations, as he initiated a policy of Native American removal. Previous presidents had at times supported removal or attempts to "civilize" the Native Americans, but had generally not made Native American affairs a top priority. By the time Jackson took office, approximately 100,000 Native Americans lived east of the Mississippi River within the United States, with most located in Indiana, Illinois, Michigan, Wisconsin Territory, Mississippi, Alabama, Georgia, and Florida Territory. Jackson prioritized removing Native Americans from the South, as he believed that the Native Americans of the Northwest could be "pushed back." In his 1829 Annual Message to Congress, Jackson advocated for setting aside land west of the Mississippi River for Native American tribes; while he favored voluntary relocation, he also proposed that any Native Americans who did not relocate would lose their independence and be subject to state laws.

A significant political movement, consisting largely of evangelical Christians and others from the North, rejected Native American removal and instead favored continuing efforts to "civilize" Native Americans. Overcoming opposition led by Senator Theodore Frelinghuysen, Jackson's allies won the passage of the Indian Removal Act in May 1830. The bill passed the House by a 102 to 97 vote, with most Southern congressmen voting for the bill and most Northern congressmen voting against it. The act authorized the president to negotiate treaties to buy tribal lands in the east in exchange for lands farther west, outside of existing state borders. The act specifically pertained to the "Five Civilized Tribes" in the Southern United States, the conditions being that they could either move west or stay and obey state law. The Five Civilized Tribes consisted of the Cherokee, Muscogee (also known as the Creek), Chickasaw, Choctaw, and Seminole Native Americans, all of whom had adopted aspects of European culture, including some degree of sedentary farming.

=== Cherokee ===
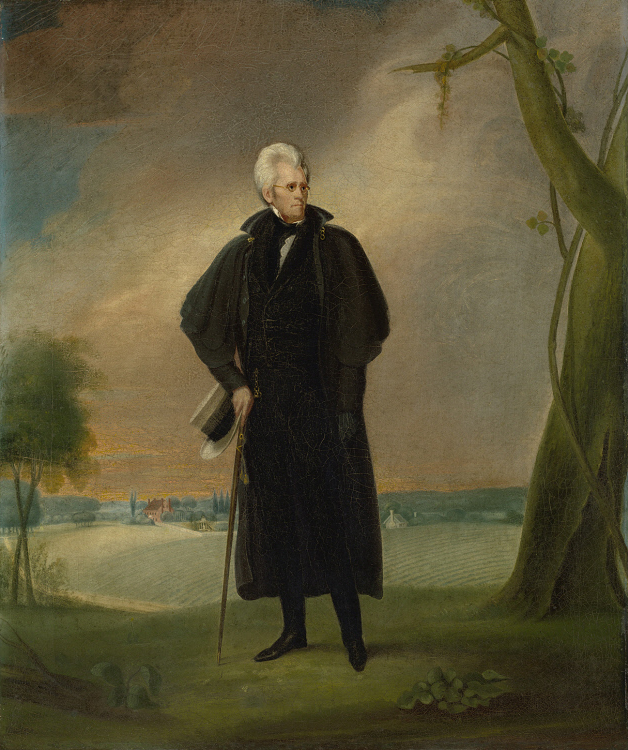
Jackson painted by Earl, 1830

With Jackson's support, Georgia and other states sought to extend their sovereignty over tribes within their borders, despite existing U.S. treaty obligations. Georgia's dispute with the Cherokee culminated in the 1832 Supreme Court decision of Worcester v. Georgia. In that decision, Chief Justice John Marshall, writing for the court, ruled that Georgia could not forbid whites from entering tribal lands, as it had attempted to do with two missionaries supposedly stirring up resistance among the tribespeople. The Supreme Court's ruling helped establish the doctrine of tribal sovereignty, but Georgia did not release the prisoners. Jackson is frequently attributed the following response: "John Marshall has made his decision, now let him enforce it." Remini argues that Jackson did not say it because, while it "certainly sounds like Jackson...[t]here was nothing for him to enforce." The court had held that Georgia must release the prisoners, but it had not compelled the federal government to become involved. In late 1832, Van Buren intervened on behalf of the administration to put an end to the situation, persuading Georgia Governor Wilson Lumpkin to pardon the missionaries.

As the Supreme Court was no longer involved, and the Jackson administration had no interest in interfering with Indian removal, the state of Georgia was free to extend its control over the Cherokee. In 1832, Georgia held a lottery to distribute Cherokee lands to white settlers. Under the leadership of Chief John Ross, most Cherokee refused to leave their homeland, but a group led by John Ridge and Elias Boudinot negotiated the Treaty of New Echota. In return for $5 million and land west of the Mississippi River, Ridge and Boudinot agreed to lead a faction of the Cherokee out of Georgia; a fraction of the Cherokee would leave in 1836. Many other Cherokee protested the treaty, but, by a narrow margin, the United States Senate voted to ratify the treaty in May 1836. The Treaty of New Echota was enforced by Jackson's successor, Van Buren; subsequently, as many as 4,000 out of 18,000 Cherokees died on the "Trail of Tears" in 1838.

=== Other tribes ===
Jackson, Eaton, and General John Coffee negotiated with the Chickasaw, who quickly agreed to move. Jackson put Eaton and Coffee in charge of negotiating with the Choctaw tribe. Lacking Jackson's skills at negotiation, they frequently bribed the chiefs in order to gain their submission. The Choctaw chiefs agreed to move with the signing of the Treaty of Dancing Rabbit Creek. The removal of the Choctaw took place in the winter of 1831 and 1832, and was wrought with misery and suffering. Members of the Creek Nation signed the Treaty of Cusseta in 1832, allowing the Creek to either sell or retain their land. Conflict later erupted between the Creek who remained and the white settlers, leading to the Second Creek War. The Creek uprising was quickly crushed by the army, and the remaining Creek were escorted across the Mississippi River.

Of all the tribes in the Southeast, the Seminoles proved to be the most resistant to mass relocation. The Jackson administration reached a removal treaty with a small group of Seminoles, but the treaty was repudiated by the tribe. Jackson sent soldiers into Florida to remove the Seminoles, marking the start of the Second Seminole War. The Second Seminole War dragged on until 1842, and hundreds of Seminole still remained in Florida after 1842. A shorter conflict broke out in the Northwest in 1832 after Chief Black Hawk led a band of Native Americans across the Mississippi River to their ancestral homeland in Illinois. A combination of the army and the Illinois militia drove out the Native Americans by the end of the year, bringing a close to the Black Hawk War. By the end of Jackson's presidency, nearly 50,000 Native Americans had moved across the Mississippi River, and Indian removal would continue after he left office.

=== Smallpox vaccination ===
Jackson in 1832 signed Congressional authorization and funding to set up a smallpox vaccination program for Indian tribes. The goal was to eliminate the deadly threat of smallpox to a population with little or no immunity, and at the same time exhibit the benefits of cooperation with the government. In practice there were severe obstacles. The tribal medicine men launched a strong opposition, warning of white trickery and offering an alternative explanation and system of cure. They taught that the affliction could best be cured by a sweat bath followed by a rapid plunge into cold water. Furthermore, the vaccines often lost their potency when transported and stored over long distances with primitive storage facilities. It was too little and too late to avoid the great smallpox epidemic of 1837 to 1840 that swept across North America west of the Mississippi, all the way to Canada and Alaska. Deaths have been estimated in the range of 100,000 to 300,000, with entire tribes wiped out. Over 90 percent of the Mandans died.

== Slavery controversies ==
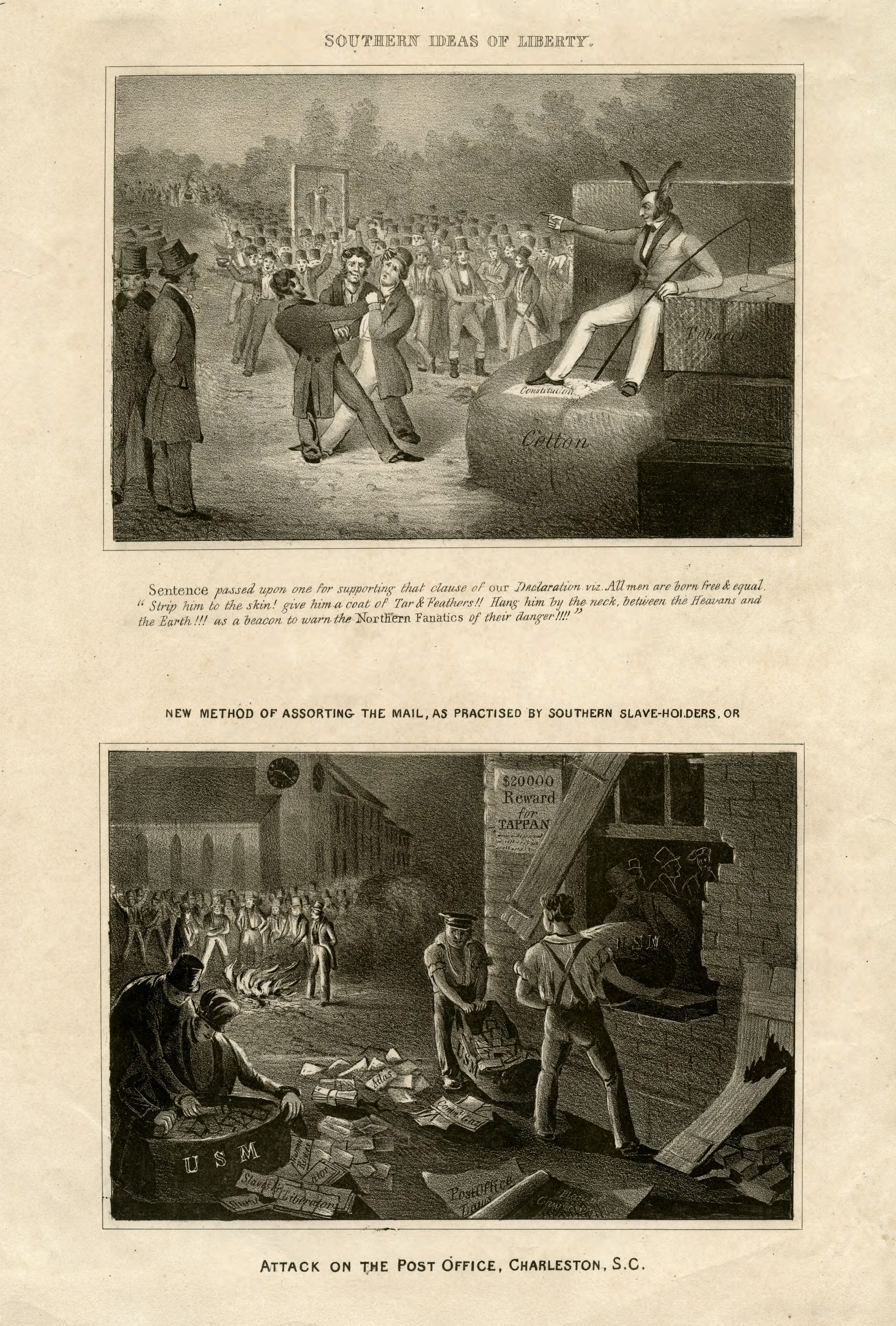
Abolitionists sent 100,000 pamphlets to the southern U.S. in 1835, including stacks of anti-slavery tracts to the general attention of "Methodist ministers" in riverfront villages along the Mississippi; this abolitionist image illustrates how their 1835 postal campaign was met with resistance in the slaveholding states, including threats of lynching, destroying mail, and placing a rhetorical bounty on the head of Arthur Tappan (Library Company of Philadelphia P.8658)

A slave owner himself, Jackson favored the expansion of slavery into the territories and disapproved of anti-slavery agitation. Though slavery was not a major issue of Jackson's presidency, two notable controversies related to slavery arose while he was in the White House. In 1835, the American Anti-Slavery Society launched a mail campaign against the peculiar institution. Tens of thousands of antislavery pamphlets and tracts were sent to Southern destinations through the U.S. mail. Across the South, reaction to the abolition mail campaign bordered on apoplexy. The use of the mail by meddling abolitionists from outside the slave states disrupted the white South's culture-wide agreement not to question the morality of slavery, and per rhetoric professor Jennifer Mercieca, "It was this willful intrusion into the southern public sphere that slaveholders most objected to; the slavocracy simply did not want the question of abolition to be publicly discussed." In Congress, Southerners demanded the prevention of delivery of the tracts, and Jackson moved to placate Southerners in the aftermath of the nullification crisis. Abolitionists decried Postmaster General Amos Kendall's decision to give Southern postmasters discretionary powers to discard the tracts as a suppression of free speech.

Another conflict over slavery in 1835 ensued when abolitionists sent the U.S. House of Representatives petitions to end the slave trade and slavery in Washington, D.C. These petitions infuriated pro-slavery Southerners, who attempted to prevent acknowledgement or discussion of the petitions. Northern Whigs objected that anti-slavery petitions were constitutional and should not be forbidden. South Carolina Representative Henry L. Pinckney introduced a resolution that denounced the petitions as "sickly sentimentality", declared that Congress had no right to interfere with slavery, and tabled all further anti-slavery petitions. Southerners in Congress, including many of Jackson's supporters, favored the measure (the 21st Rule, commonly called the "gag rule"), which was passed quickly and without any debate, thus temporarily suppressing abolitionist activities in Congress.

Two other important slavery-related developments occurred while Jackson was in office. In January 1831, William Lloyd Garrison established The Liberator, which emerged as the most influential abolitionist newspaper in the country. While many slavery opponents sought the gradual emancipation of all slaves, Garrison called for the immediate abolition of slavery throughout the country. Garrison also established the American Anti-Slavery Society, which grew to approximately 250,000 members by 1838. In the same year that Garrison founded The Liberator, Nat Turner launched his slave rebellion. After killing dozens of whites in southeastern Virginia across two days, Turner's rebels were suppressed by a combination of vigilantes, the state militia, and federal soldiers.

== Nullification crisis and the tariff ==
=== First term ===
In 1828, Congress had approved the so-called "Tariff of Abominations", which set the tariff at a historically high rate. The tariff was popular in the Northeast and, to a lesser extent, the Northwest, since it protected domestic industries from foreign competition. Southern planters strongly opposed high tariff rates, as they resulted in higher prices for imported goods. This opposition to high tariff rates was especially intense in South Carolina, where the dominant planter class faced few checks on extremism. The South Carolina Exposition and Protest of 1828, secretly written by Calhoun, had asserted that their state could "nullify"—declare void—the tariff legislation of 1828. Calhoun argued that, while the Constitution authorized the federal government to impose tariffs for the collection of revenue, it did not sanction tariffs that were designed to protect domestic production. Jackson sympathized with states' rights concerns, but he rejected the idea of nullification. In his 1829 Annual Message to Congress, Jackson advocated leaving the tariff in place until the national debt was paid off. He also favored a constitutional amendment that would, once the national debt was paid off, distribute surplus revenues from tariffs to the states.

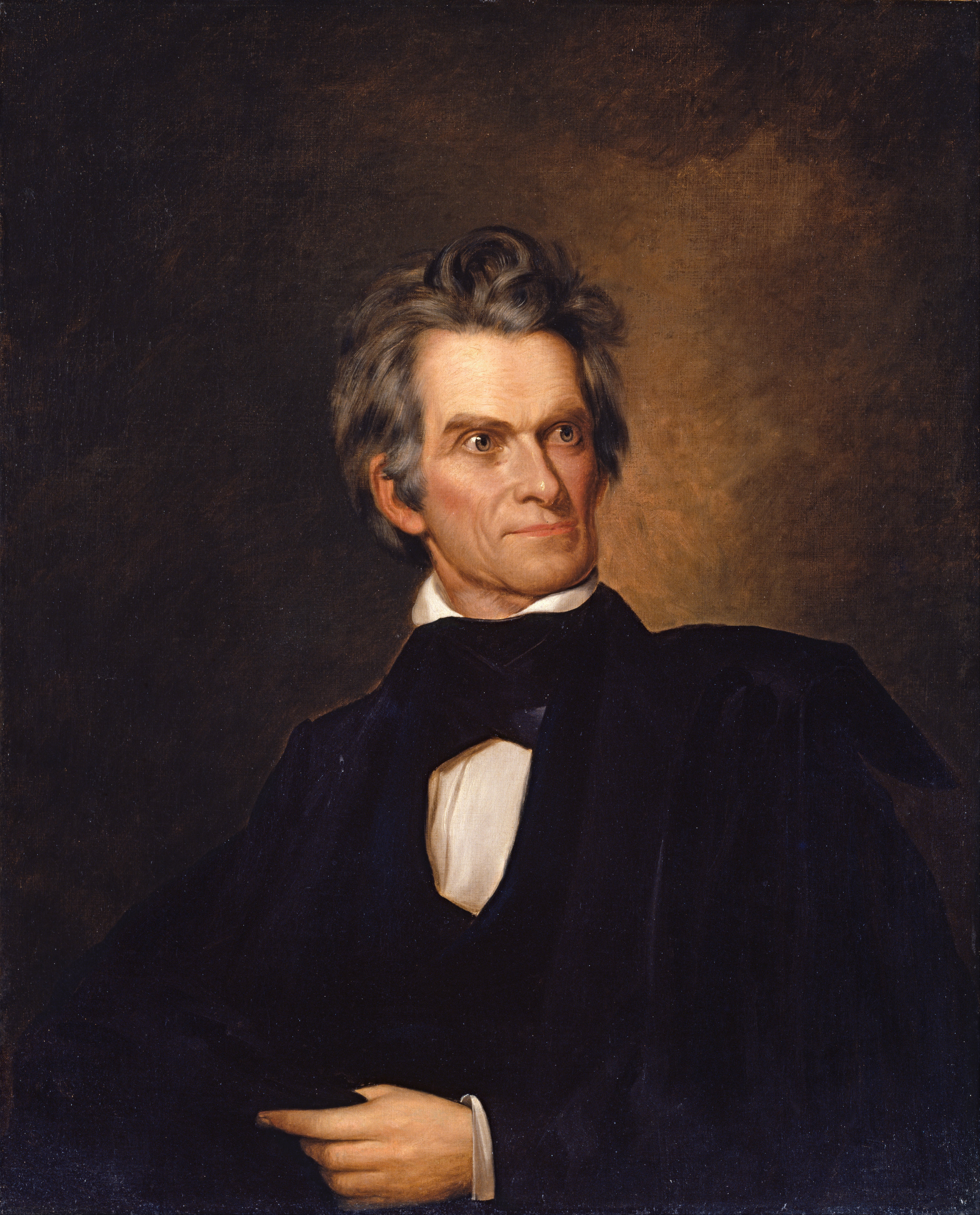
John C. Calhoun of South Carolina

Calhoun was not as extreme as some within South Carolina, and he and his allies kept more radical leaders like Robert James Turnbull in check early in Jackson's presidency. As the Petticoat affair strained relations between Jackson and Calhoun, South Carolina nullifiers became increasingly strident in their opposition to the "Tariff of Abominations." Relations between Jackson and Calhoun reached a breaking point in May 1830, after Jackson discovered a letter that indicated that then-Secretary of War Calhoun had asked President Monroe to censure Jackson for his invasion of Spanish Florida in 1818. Jackson's adviser, William Lewis, acquired the letter from William Crawford, a former Monroe cabinet official who was eager to help Van Buren at the expense of Calhoun. Jackson and Calhoun began an angry correspondence which lasted until July 1830. By the end of 1831, an open break had emerged not just between Calhoun and Jackson but also between their respective supporters. Writing in the early 1830s, Calhoun claimed that three parties existed. One party (led by Calhoun himself) favored free trade, one party (led by Henry Clay) favored protectionism, and one party (led by Jackson) occupied a middle position.

Believing that Calhoun was leading a conspiracy to undermine his administration, Jackson built a network of informants in South Carolina and prepared for a possible insurrection. He also threw his support behind a tariff reduction bill that he believed would defuse the nullification issue. In May 1832, Representative John Quincy Adams introduced a slightly revised version of the bill, which Jackson accepted, and it was passed into law in July 1832. The bill failed to satisfy many in the South, and a majority of southern Congressmen voted against it, but passage of the Tariff of 1832 prevented tariff rates from becoming a major campaign issue in the 1832 election.

=== Crisis ===
Seeking to compel a further reduction in tariff rates and bolster the ideology of states' rights, South Carolina leaders prepared to follow through on their nullification threats after the 1832 election. In November 1832, South Carolina held a state convention that declared the tariff rates of 1828 and 1832 to be void within the state, and further declared that federal collection of import duties would be illegal after January 1833. After the convention, the South Carolina Legislature elected Calhoun to the U.S. Senate, replacing Robert Y. Hayne, who had resigned to become that state's governor. Hayne had often struggled to defend nullification on the floor of the Senate, especially against fierce criticism from Senator Daniel Webster of Massachusetts.

In his December 1832 Annual Message to Congress, Jackson called for another reduction of the tariff, but he also vowed to suppress any rebellion. Days later, Jackson issued his Proclamation to the People of South Carolina, which strongly denied the right of states to nullify federal laws or secede.Jackson ordered the unionist South Carolina leader, Joel Roberts Poinsett, to organize a posse to suppress any rebellion, and promised Poinsett that 50,000 soldiers would be dispatched if any rebellion did break out. At the same time, Governor Hayne asked for volunteers for the state militia, and 25,000 men volunteered. Jackson's nationalist stance split the Democratic Party and set off a national debate over nullification. Outside of South Carolina, no Southern states endorsed nullification, but many also expressed opposition to Jackson's threat to use force.

Democratic Congressman Gulian C. Verplanck introduced a tariff reduction bill in the House of Representatives that would restore the tariff levels of the Tariff of 1816, and South Carolina leaders decided to delay the onset of nullification while Congress considered a new tariff bill. As the debate over the tariff continued, Jackson asked Congress to pass a "Force Bill" explicitly authorizing the use of military force to enforce the government's power to collect import duties. Though the House effort to write a new tariff bill collapsed, Clay initiated Senate consideration of the topic by introducing his own bill. Clay, the most prominent protectionist in the country, worked with Calhoun's allies rather than Jackson's allies to pass the bill. He won Calhoun's approval for a bill that provided for gradual tariff reductions until 1843, with tariff rates ultimately reaching levels similar to those proposed in the Verplanck bill. Southern leaders would have preferred lower rates, but they accepted Clay's bill as the best compromise they could achieve at that point in time. The Force Bill, meanwhile, passed both houses of Congress; many Southern congressmen opposed the bill but did not vote against it in an effort to expedite consideration of the tariff bill.

Clay's tariff bill received significant support across partisan and sectional lines, and it passed 149–47 in the House and 29–16 in the Senate. Despite his intense anger over the scrapping of the Verplanck bill and the new alliance between Clay and Calhoun, Jackson saw the tariff bill as an acceptable way to end the crisis. He signed both the Tariff of 1833 and the Force Bill into law on March 2. Simultaneous passage of the Force Bill and the tariff allowed both the nullifiers and Jackson to claim that they had emerged victorious from the confrontation. Despite his earlier support for a similar measure, Jackson vetoed a third bill that would have distributed tariff revenue to the states. The South Carolina Convention met and rescinded its nullification ordinance, and, in a final show of defiance, nullified the Force Bill. Though the nullifiers had largely failed in their quest to lower tariff rates, they established firm control over South Carolina in the aftermath of the Nullification Crisis.

== Bank War and 1832 re-election ==
=== First term ===
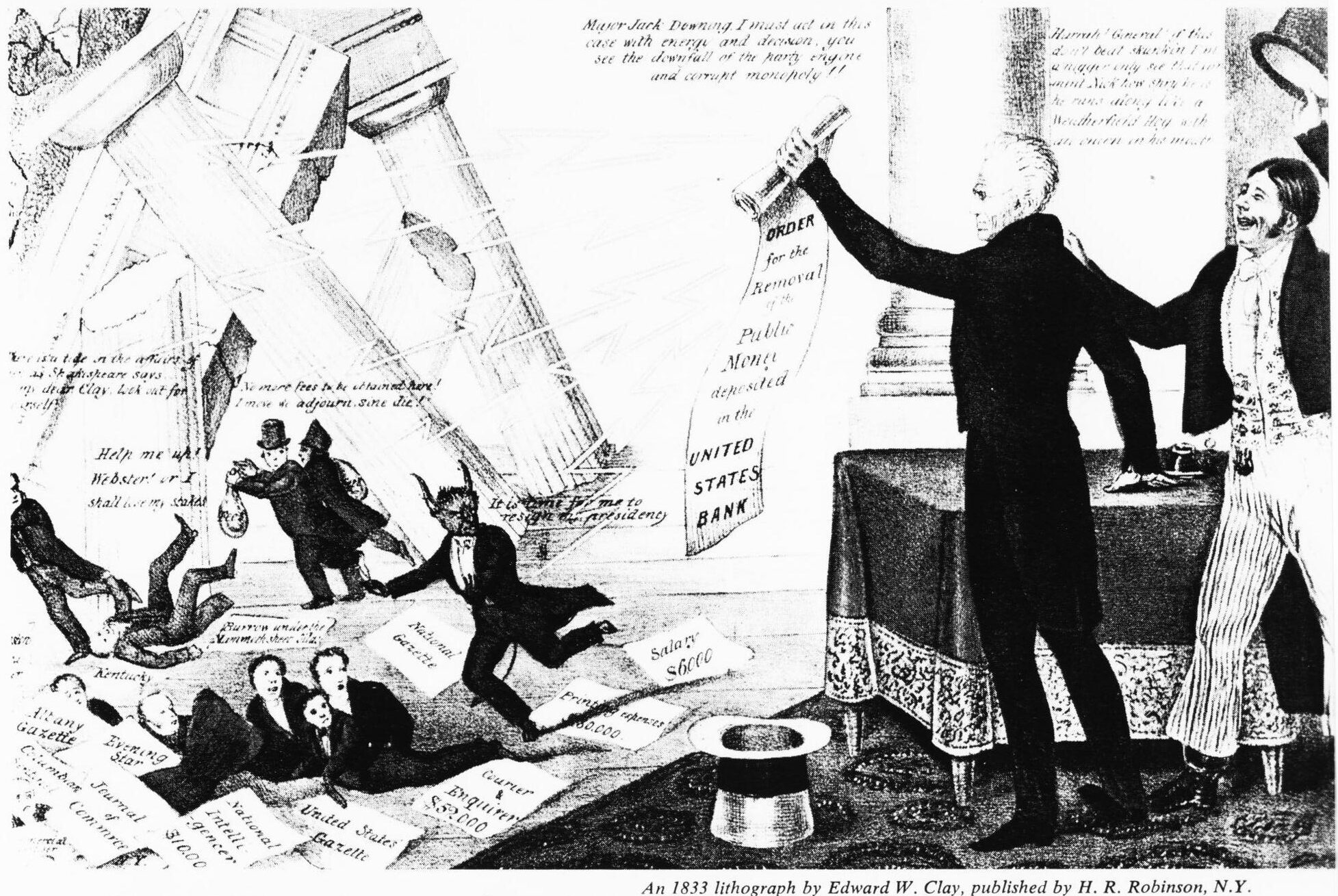
1833 Democratic cartoon shows Jackson destroying the devil's Bank

The Second Bank of the United States ("national bank") had been chartered under President James Madison to restore an economy devastated by the War of 1812, and President Monroe had appointed Nicholas Biddle as the national bank's executive in 1822. The national bank operated branches in several states, and granted these branches a large degree of autonomy. The national bank's duties included storing government funds, issuing banknotes, selling Treasury securities, facilitating foreign transactions, and extending credit to businesses and other banks. The national bank also played an important role in regulating the money supply, which consisted of government-issued coins and privately issued banknotes. By presenting private banknotes for redemption (exchange for coins) to their issuers, the national bank limited the supply of paper money in the country. By the time Jackson took office, the national bank had approximately $35 million in capital, which represented more than twice the annual expenditures of the U.S. government.

The national bank had not been a major issue in the 1828 election, but some in the country, including Jackson, despised the institution. The national bank's stock was mostly held by foreigners, Jackson insisted, and it exerted an undue amount of control over the political system. Jackson had developed a life-long hatred for banks earlier in his career, and he wanted to remove all banknotes from circulation. In his address to Congress in 1830, Jackson called for the abolition of the national bank. Senator Thomas Hart Benton, a strong supporter of the president despite a brawl years earlier, gave a speech strongly denouncing the Bank and calling for open debate on its recharter, but Senator Daniel Webster led a motion that narrowly defeated the resolution. Seeking to reconcile with the Jackson administration, Biddle appointed Democrats to the boards of national bank branches and worked to speed up the retirement of the national debt.

Though Jackson and many of his allies detested the national bank, others within the Jacksonian coalition, including Eaton and Senator Samuel Smith, supported the institution. Despite some misgivings, Jackson supported a plan proposed in late 1831 by his moderately pro-national bank Treasury Secretary Louis McLane, who was secretly working with Biddle. McLane's plan would recharter a reformed version of the national bank in a way that would free up funds, partly through the sale of government stock in the national bank. The funds would in turn be used to strengthen the military or pay off the nation's debt. Over the objections of Attorney General Taney, an irreconcilable opponent of the national bank, Jackson allowed McLane to publish a Treasury Report which essentially recommended rechartering the national bank.

Hoping to make the national bank a major issue in the 1832 election, Clay and Webster urged Biddle to immediately apply for recharter rather than wait to reach a compromise with the administration. Biddle received advice to the contrary from moderate Democrats such as McLane and William Lewis, who argued that Biddle should wait because Jackson would likely veto the recharter bill. In January 1832, Biddle submitted to Congress a renewal of the national bank's charter without any of McLane's proposed reforms. In May 1832, after months of congressional debate, Biddle assented to a revised bill that would re-charter the national bank but give Congress and the president new powers in controlling the institution, while also limiting the national bank's ability to hold real estate and establish branches. The recharter bill passed the Senate on June 11 and the House on July 3, 1832.

When Van Buren met Jackson on July 4, Jackson declared, "The Bank, Mr. Van Buren, is trying to kill me. But I will kill it." Jackson officially vetoed the bill on July 10. His veto message, crafted primarily by Taney, Kendall, and Andrew Jackson Donelson, attacked the national bank as an agent of inequality that supported only the wealthy. He also noted that, as the national bank's charter would not expire for another four years, the next two Congresses would be able to consider new re-chartering bills. Jackson's message ended on a sharp note that Remini says "almost sounded like a call to class warfare":

when the laws undertake to add ... artificial distinctions ... to make the rich richer and the potent more powerful, the humble members of society — the farmers, mechanics, and laborers — who have neither the time nor the means of securing like favors to themselves, have a right to complain of the injustice of their Government.

Jackson's enemies castigated the veto as "the very slang of the leveller and demagogue", claiming Jackson was using class warfare to gain support from the common man. Whig leader Daniel Webster denounced the veto message on the Senate floor.

It manifestly seeks to influence the poor against the rich. It wantonly attacks whole classes of the people, for the purpose of turning against them the prejudices and resentments of other classes. It is a State paper which finds no topic too exciting for its use, no passion too inflammable for its address and its solicitation.

=== 1832 election ===
In the years leading up to the 1832 election, it was unclear whether Jackson, frequently in poor health, would seek re-election. However, Jackson announced his intention to seek re-election in 1831. Various individuals were considered as possible Democratic vice presidential nominees in the 1832 election, including Van Buren, Judge Philip P. Barbour, Treasury Secretary McLane, Senator William Wilkins, Associate Justice John McLean, and even Calhoun. In order to agree on a national ticket, the Democrats held their first national convention in May 1832. Van Buren emerged as Jackson's preferred running mate after the Eaton affair, and the former Secretary of State won the vice presidential nomination on the first ballot of the 1832 Democratic National Convention. Later that year, on December 28, Calhoun resigned as vice president, after having been elected to the U.S. Senate. (Note: Hugh Lawson White, President pro tempore of the Senate, was first in line in the United States presidential line of succession between December 28, 1832 and March 4, 1833.)

In the 1832 election, Jackson would face a divided opposition in the form of the Anti-Masonic Party and the National Republicans. Since the disappearance and possible murder of William Morgan in 1827, the Anti-Masonic Party had emerged by capitalizing on opposition to Freemasonry. In 1830, a meeting of Anti-Masons called for the first national nominating convention, and in September 1831 the fledgling party nominated a national ticket led by William Wirt of Maryland. In December 1831, the National Republicans convened and nominated a ticket led by Henry Clay. Clay had rejected overtures from the Anti-Masonic Party, and his attempt to convince Calhoun to serve as his running mate failed, leaving the opposition to Jackson split among different leaders. For vice president, the National Republicans nominated John Sergeant, who had served as an attorney for both the Second Bank of the United States and the Cherokee Nation.

1832 election results

The political struggle over the national bank emerged as the major issue of the 1832 campaign, although the tariff and especially Indian removal were also important issues in several states. National Republicans also focused on Jackson's alleged executive tyranny; one cartoon described the president as "King Andrew the First." At Biddle's direction, the national bank poured thousands of dollars into the campaign to defeat Jackson, seemingly confirming Jackson's view that it interfered in the political process. On July 21, Clay said privately, "The campaign is over, and I think we have won the victory."

Jackson, however, managed to successfully portray his veto of the national bank recharter as a defense of the common man against governmental tyranny. Clay proved to be no match for Jackson's popularity and the Democratic Party's skillful campaigning. Jackson won the election by a landslide, winning 219 electoral votes, well over the 145 needed. Jackson won 54.2 percent of the popular vote nationwide, a slight decline from his 1828 popular vote victory. Jackson received 88 percent of the popular vote in states south of Kentucky and Maryland, while Clay received no votes in Georgia, Alabama, or Mississippi. Clay received 37% of the popular vote and 49 electoral votes, whereas Wirt received 8% of the vote and seven electoral votes. The South Carolina legislature awarded the state's electoral votes to states' rights advocate John Floyd. Despite Jackson's victory in the presidential election, his allies lost control of the Senate.

=== Removal of deposits and censure ===
Jackson's victory in the 1832 election meant that he could veto an extension of the national bank's charter before that charter expired in 1836. Though a congressional override of his veto was unlikely, Jackson still wanted to ensure that the national bank would be abolished. His administration was unable to legally remove federal deposits from the national bank unless the Secretary of the Treasury issued an official finding that the national bank was a fiscally unsound institution, but the national bank was clearly solvent. In January 1833, at the height of the Nullification Crisis, Congressman James K. Polk introduced a bill that would provide for the removal of the federal government's deposits from the national bank, but it was quickly defeated. Following the end of the Nullification Crisis in March 1833, Jackson renewed his offensive against the national bank, despite some opposition from within his own cabinet. Throughout mid-1833, Jackson made preparations to remove federal deposits from the national bank, sending Amos Kendall to meet with the leaders of various banks to see whether they would accept federal deposits.

Jackson ordered Secretary of the Treasury William Duane to remove existing federal deposits from the national bank, but Duane refused to issue a finding that the federal government's deposits in the national bank were unsafe. In response, Jackson replaced Duane with Roger Taney, who received an interim appointment. Rather than removing existing deposits from the national bank, Taney and Jackson pursued a new policy in which the government would deposit future revenue elsewhere, while paying all expenses from its deposits with the national bank. The Jackson administration placed government deposits in a variety of state banks which were friendly to the administration's policies; critics labeled these banks as "pet banks." Biddle responded to the withdrawals by stockpiling the national bank's reserves and contracting credit, thus causing interest rates to rise. Intended to force Jackson into a compromise, the move backfired, increasing sentiment against the national bank. The transfer of large amounts of bank deposits, combined with rising interest rates, contributed to the onset of a financial panic in late 1833.

When Congress reconvened in December 1833, it immediately became embroiled in the controversy regarding the withdrawals from the national bank and the subsequent financial panic. Neither the Democrats nor the anti-Jacksonians exercised complete control of either house of Congress, but the Democrats were stronger in the House of Representatives while the anti-Jacksonians were stronger in the Senate. Senator Clay introduced a measure to censure Jackson for unconstitutionally removing federal deposits from the national bank, and in March 1834, the Senate voted to censure Jackson in a 26–20 vote. It also rejected Taney as Treasury Secretary, forcing Jackson to find a different treasury secretary; he eventually nominated Levi Woodbury, who won confirmation.

Led by Polk, the House declared on April 4, 1834, that the national bank "ought not to be rechartered" and that the depositions "ought not to be restored." The House also voted to allow the pet banks to continue to serve as places of deposit, and sought to investigate whether the national bank had deliberately instigated the financial panic. By mid-1834, the relatively mild panic had ended, and Jackson's opponents had failed to recharter the national bank or reverse Jackson's removals. The national bank's federal charter expired in 1836, and though Biddle's institution continued to function under a Pennsylvania charter, it never regained the influence it had had at the beginning of Jackson's administration. Following the loss of the national bank's federal charter, New York City supplanted Philadelphia (the national bank's headquarters) as the nation's financial capital. In January 1837, when the Jacksonians had a majority in the Senate, the censure was expunged after years of effort by Jackson supporters.

== Rise of the Whig Party ==
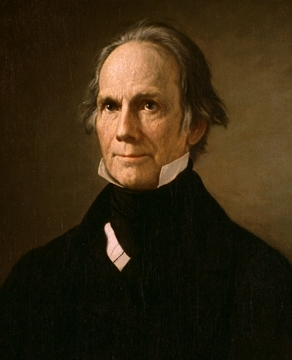
Henry Clay of Kentucky

Clear partisan affiliations had not formed at the start of Jackson's presidency. He had supporters in the Northwest, the Northeast, and the South, all of whom had different positions on different issues. The Nullification Crisis briefly scrambled the partisan divisions that had emerged after 1824, as many within the Jacksonian coalition opposed his threats of force, while some opposition leaders like Daniel Webster supported them. Jackson's removal of the government deposits in late 1833 ended any possibility of a Webster-Jackson alliance and helped to solidify partisan lines. Jackson's threats to use force during the Nullification Crisis and his alliance with Van Buren motivated many Southern leaders to leave the Democratic Party, while opposition to Indian removal and Jackson's actions in the Bank War spurred opposition from many in the North. Attacking the president's "executive usurpation," those opposed to Jackson coalesced into the Whig Party. The Whig label implicitly compared "King Andrew" to King George III, the British monarch during the American Revolution.

The National Republicans, including Clay and Webster, formed the core of the Whig Party, but many Anti-Masons like William H. Seward of New York and Thaddeus Stevens of Pennsylvania also joined. Several prominent Democrats defected to the Whigs, including former Attorney General John Berrien, Senator Willie Person Mangum of North Carolina, and John Tyler of Virginia. Even John Eaton, the former Secretary of War, became a member of the Whig Party. Beginning in December 1833, voting behavior in Congress began to be dominated by partisan affiliation. By the time of the 1836 presidential election, Whigs and Democrats had established state parties throughout the country, though party strength varied by state and many of Jackson's opponents in the Deep South eschewed the Whig label. While Democrats openly embraced partisanship and campaigning, many Whigs only reluctantly accepted the new system of party politics, and they lagged behind the Democrats in establishing national organizations and cross-sectional unity. Along with the Democrats, the Whigs were one of the two major parties of the Second Party System, which would extend into the 1850s. Calhoun's nullifiers did not fit neatly into either party, and they pursued alliances with both major parties at various times.

== Panic of 1837 ==
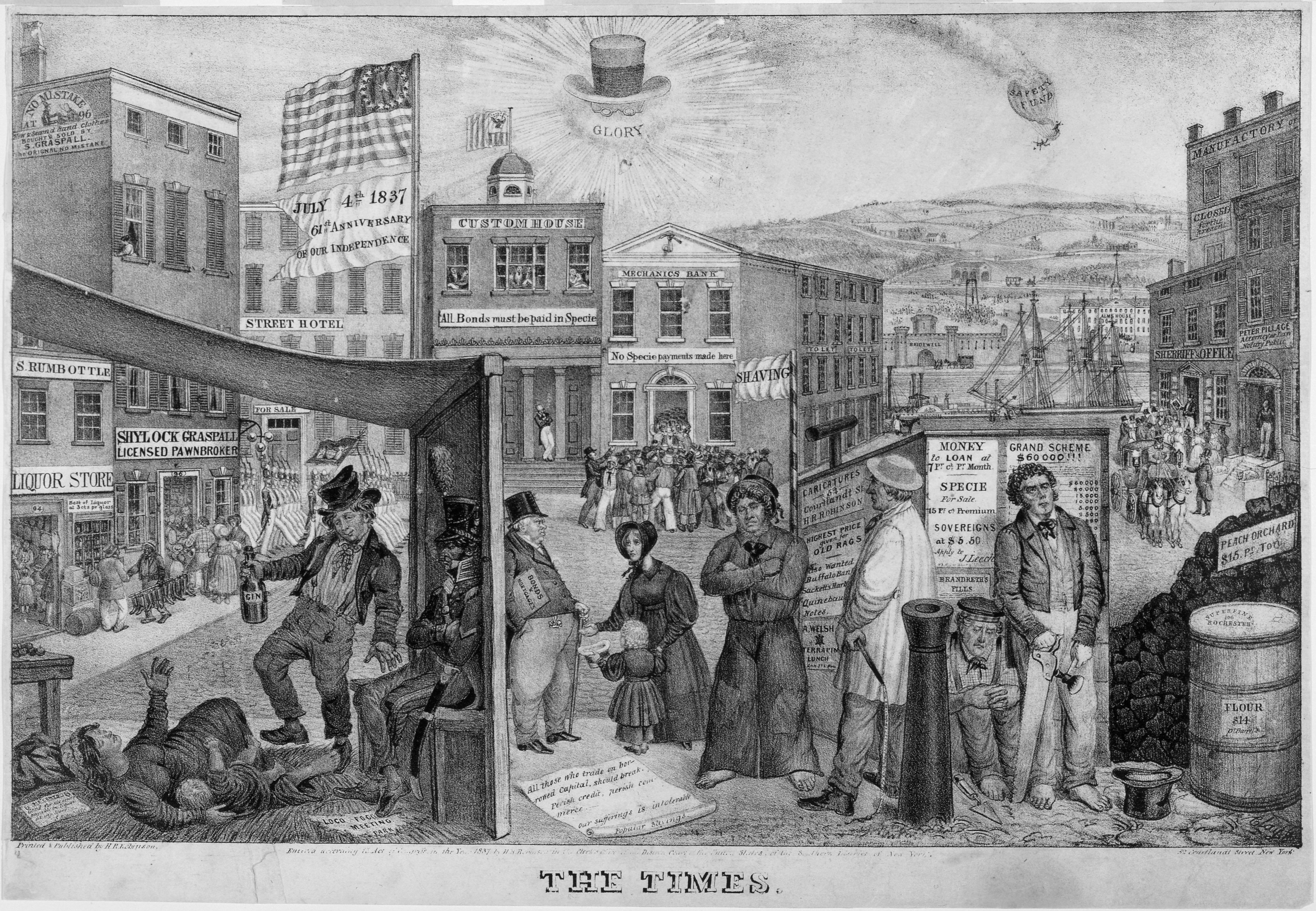
A New York newspaper blamed the Panic of 1837 on Andrew Jackson, depicted in spectacles and top hat.

The national economy boomed after mid-1834 as state banks liberally extended credit. Due in part to the booming economy, Jackson paid off the entire national debt in January 1835, the only time in U.S. history that that has been accomplished. In the aftermath of the Bank War, Jackson asked Congress to pass a bill to regulate the pet banks. Jackson sought to restrict the issuance of paper banknotes under $5, and also to require banks to hold specie (gold or silver coins) equal to one fourth of the value of banknotes they issued. As Congress did not act on this proposal by the end of its session in March 1835, Secretary of the Treasury Woodbury forced the pet banks to accept restrictions similar to those that Jackson had proposed to Congress.

The debate over financial regulation became tied to a debate over the disposition of the federal budget surplus and proposals to increase the number of pet banks. In June 1836, Congress passed a bill that doubled the number of pet banks, distributed surplus federal revenue to the states, and instituted Jackson's proposed bank regulations. Jackson considered vetoing the bill primarily due to his opposition to the distribution of federal revenue, but he ultimately decided to let it pass into law. As the number of pet banks increased from 33 to 81, regulation of the government's deposits became more difficult, and lending increased. The growing number of loans contributed to a boom in land prices and land sales; the United States General Land Office sold 12.5 million acres of public land in 1835, compared to 2 million acres in 1829. Seeking to curb land speculation, Jackson issued the Specie Circular, an executive order that required buyers of government lands to pay in specie. The Specie Circular undermined the public's trust in the value of paper money; Congress passed a bill to revoke Jackson's policy, but Jackson vetoed that bill on his last day in office.

The period of good economic conditions ended with the onset of the Panic of 1837. Jackson's Specie Circular, albeit designed to reduce speculation and stabilize the economy, left many investors unable to afford to pay loans in gold and silver. The same year there was a downturn in Great Britain's economy, resulting in decreased foreign investment in the United States. As a result, the U.S. economy went into a depression, banks became insolvent, the national debt increased, business failures rose, cotton prices dropped, and unemployment dramatically increased. The depression that followed lasted until 1841, when the economy began to rebound.

== Other domestic issues ==
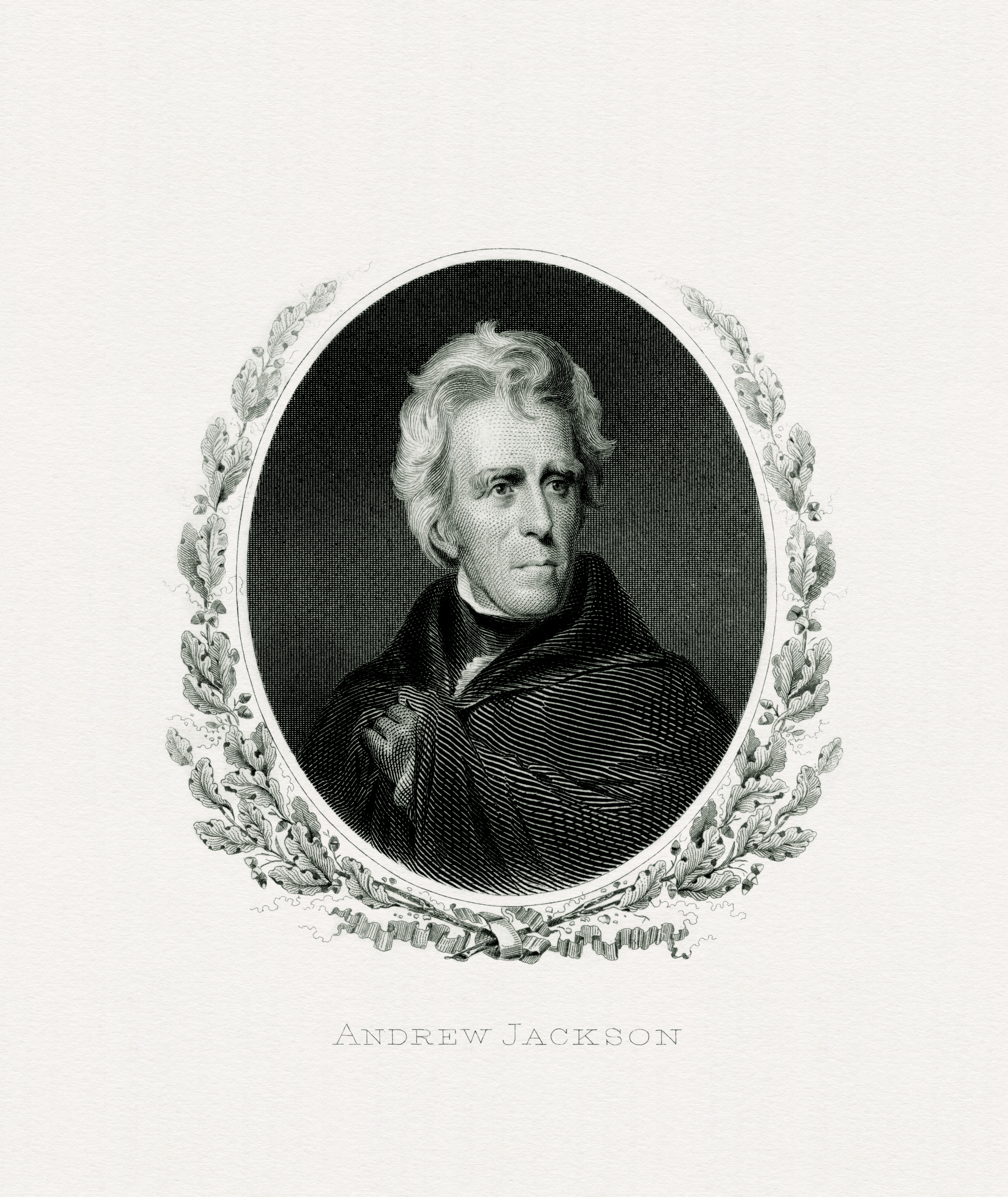
BEP engraved portrait of Jackson as President

=== Internal improvements ===
In the years before Jackson took office, the idea of using federal funding to build or improve internal improvements (such as roads and canals) had become increasingly popular. Jackson had campaigned against Adams's support for federally funded infrastructure projects, but, unlike some states' rights supporters, Jackson believed that such projects were constitutional so long as they aided the national defense or improved the national economy. The National Road was one of the major infrastructure projects worked on during Jackson's presidency, and his tenure saw the National Road extended from Ohio into Illinois. In May 1830, the House passed a bill to create the Maysville Road, which would link the National Road to the Natchez Trace via Lexington, Kentucky. With the strong support of Van Buren, Jackson vetoed the bill, arguing that the project was too localized for the federal government to become involved. Jackson further warned that government expenditures on infrastructure would be costly and threatened his goal of retiring the national debt. The veto shored up Jackson's support among pro-states' rights "Old Republicans" like John Randolph, but angered some Jacksonians who favored internal improvements.

Despite the Maysville Road Veto, federal funding for infrastructure projects increased substantially during Jackson's presidency, reaching a total greater than all previous administrations combined. Because of a booming economy and high levels of federal revenues, the Jackson administration was able to retire the national debt even while spending on infrastructure projects increased.

=== U.S. Exploring Expedition ===
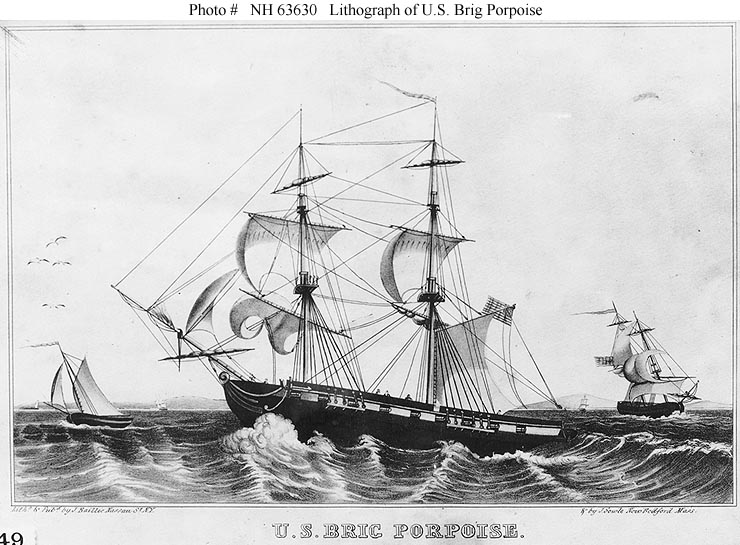
USS Porpoise, a brig ship laid down in 1835 and launched in May 1836; used in the U.S. Exploring Expedition

Jackson initially opposed any federal exploratory scientific expeditions during his first term in office. Jackson's predecessor, President Adams, had attempted to launch a scientific exploration of the ocean in 1828, but Congress was unwilling to fund the effort. When Jackson assumed office in 1829, he pocketed Adams' expedition plans. However, wanting to establish a presidential legacy similar to that of Jefferson, who had sponsored the Lewis and Clark Expedition, Jackson decided to support scientific exploration during his second term. On May 18, 1836, Jackson signed a law creating and funding the oceanic United States Exploring Expedition. Jackson put Secretary of the Navy Mahlon Dickerson in charge of planning the expedition, but Dickerson proved unfit for the task, and the expedition was not launched until 1838. One brig ship, USS Porpoise, later used in the expedition; having been commissioned by Secretary Dickerson in May 1836, circumnavigated the world and explored and mapped the Southern Ocean, confirming the existence of the continent of Antarctica.

=== Copyright ===
On February 3, 1831, Jackson signed the Copyright Act of 1831, which had four main provisions:

1. Extension of the original copyright term from 14 years to 28 years, with an option to renew the copyright for another 14 years
2. Addition of musical compositions to the list of statutorily protected works (though this protection only extended to reproductions of compositions in printed form; the public performance right was not recognized until later)
3. Extension of the statute of limitations on copyright actions from one year to two
4. Changes in copyright formality requirements.

=== Administrative reforms ===
Jackson presided over several reforms in the executive branch. Postmaster General Amos Kendall reorganized the Post Office and successfully pushed for the Post Office Act of 1836, which made the Post Office a department of the executive branch. Under Commissioner Ethan Allen Brown, the General Land Office was reorganized and expanded to accommodate the growing demand for public land. The Patent Office was also reorganized and expanded under the leadership of Henry Leavitt Ellsworth. After his request to divide the State Department into two departments was rebuffed, Jackson divided the State Department into eight bureaus. Jackson also presided over the establishment of the Office of Indian Affairs, which coordinated Indian removal and other policies related to Native Americans. By signing the Judiciary Act of 1837, Jackson played a role in extending the circuit courts to several western states.

=== States admitted to the Union ===
Two new states were admitted into the Union during Jackson's presidency: Arkansas (June 15, 1836) and Michigan (January 26, 1837). Both states increased Democratic power in Congress and voted for Van Buren in 1836.

== Foreign affairs ==
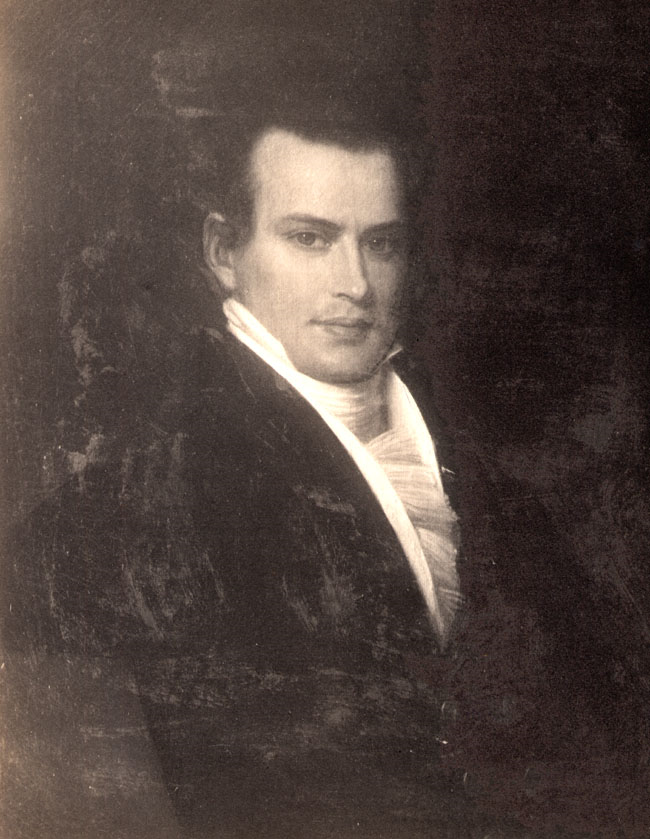
Jackson's Minister to France William C. Rives successfully negotiated payments that France owed the U.S. for damages caused by Napoleon.

=== Spoliation and commercial treaties ===
Foreign affairs under Jackson were generally uneventful prior to 1835. His administration's foreign policy focused on expanding trade opportunities for American commerce. The Jackson administration negotiated a trade agreement with Britain that opened the British West Indies and the Canadas to American exports, though the British government refused to allow American ships to engage in the West Indian carrying trade. The agreement with Britain, which had been sought by previous presidents, represented a major foreign policy success for Jackson. The State Department also negotiated routine trade agreements with Russia, Spain, the Ottoman Empire, and Siam. American exports (chiefly cotton) increased 75%, while imports increased 250%. Jackson increased funding to the navy and used it to defend American commercial interests in far-flung areas such as the Falkland Islands and Sumatra. According to Jonathan Goldstein, the Jackson presidency was the first to actively promote export and import opportunities with Asia. Secretary of the Navy Levi Woodbury, diplomat Edmund Roberts and several navy commodores took the lead. The Navy landed Marines in Sumatra and the Fiji islands to punish attacks on American merchant ships. The Navy charted hazardous Pacific zones. The State Department sent Roberts to conclude treaties to protect American trade.

A second major foreign policy emphasis was the settlement of spoliation claims. The most serious crisis involved a debt that France owed for the damage Napoleon had done two decades earlier. France agreed to pay the debt, but kept postponing payment. Jackson made warlike gestures, while domestic political opponents ridiculed his bellicosity. Jackson's Minister to France William C. Rives finally obtained the ₣ 25,000,000 francs involved (about $5,000,000) in 1836. The Department of State also settled smaller spoliation claims with Denmark, Portugal, and Spain.

=== Recognition of Republic of Texas ===
Jackson believed that Adams had bargained away rightfully American territory in the Adams–Onís Treaty, and he sought to expand the United States west. He continued Adams's policy of attempting to purchase the Mexican state of Coahuila y Tejas, which Mexico continued to rebuff. Upon gaining independence, Mexico had invited American settlers to that underdeveloped province, and 35,000 American settlers moved to the state between 1821 and 1835. Most of the settlers came from the Southern United States, and many of these settlers brought slaves with them. In 1830, fearing that the state was becoming a virtual extension of the United States, Mexico banned immigration into Coahuila y Tejas. Under Mexican rule, the American settlers became increasingly dissatisfied.

In 1835, American settlers in Texas, along with local Tejanos, fought a war for independence against Mexico. Texian leader Stephen F. Austin had sent a letter to Jackson pleading for an American military intervention, but the United States remained neutral in the conflict. By May 1836, the Texians had routed the Mexican military, establishing an independent Republic of Texas. The new Texas government sought recognition from President Jackson and annexation into the United States. Antislavery elements in the U.S. strongly opposed annexation because of slavery's presence in Texas. Jackson was reluctant to recognize Texas, as he was unconvinced that the new republic would maintain its independence from Mexico and did not want to make Texas an anti-slavery issue during the 1836 election. After the 1836 election, Jackson formally recognized the Republic of Texas, and nominated Alcée Louis la Branche as chargé d'affaires.

== Attack and assassination attempt ==
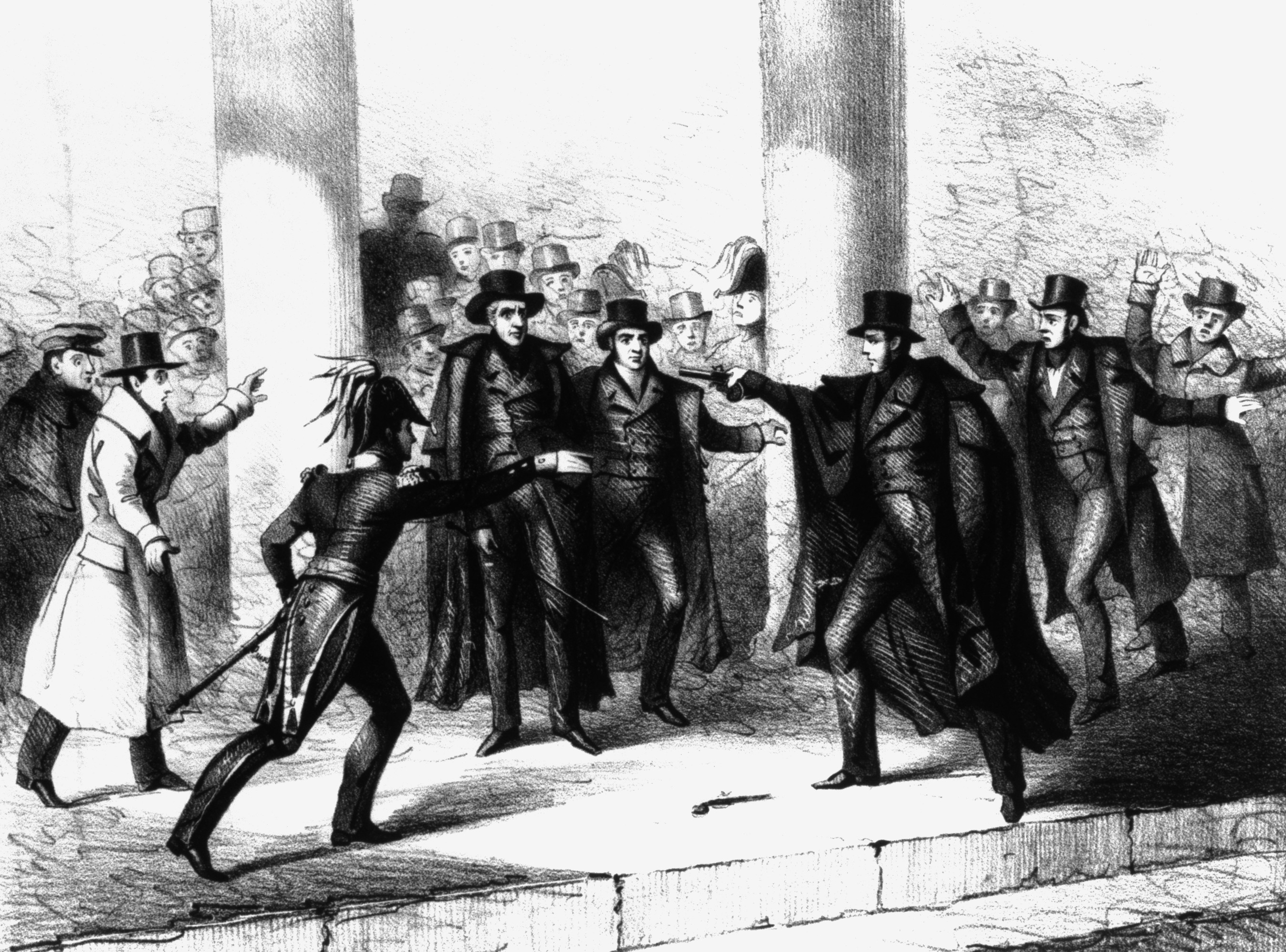
Richard Lawrence's attempt on Jackson's life, as depicted in an 1835 etching

On January 30, 1835, the first attempt to kill a sitting president occurred just outside the United States Capitol. When Jackson was leaving through the East Portico after a funeral, Richard Lawrence, an unemployed house painter from England, aimed a pistol at Jackson, which misfired. Lawrence then pulled out a second pistol, which also misfired, possibly due to the humid weather. Jackson, infuriated, attacked Lawrence with his cane, and others present restrained and disarmed Lawrence. Lawrence said that he was a deposed English king and that Jackson was his clerk. He was deemed insane and was institutionalized. Jackson initially suspected that a number of his political enemies might have orchestrated the attempt on his life, but his suspicions were never proven.

== Presidential election of 1836 ==
1836 electoral vote results

Jackson declined to seek a third term in 1836, instead throwing his support behind his chosen successor, Vice President Van Buren. With Jackson's support, Van Buren won the presidential nomination at the Democratic Convention without opposition. Representative Richard M. Johnson of Kentucky and former Virginia senator William Cabell Rives were both nominated for vice president. Southern Democrats, as well as Van Buren, strongly preferred Rives, but Jackson strongly preferred Johnson. Again, Jackson's considerable influence prevailed, and Johnson received the required two-thirds vote after New York Senator Silas Wright prevailed upon non-delegate Edward Rucker to cast the 15 votes of the absent Tennessee delegation in Johnson's favor.

Van Buren's competitors in the election of 1836 were three members of the newly established Whig Party, still a loose coalition bound by mutual opposition to Jackson's Bank War. The Whigs ran several regional candidates in hopes of sending the election to the House of Representatives, where each state delegation would have one vote and the Whigs would stand a better chance of winning. Senator Hugh Lawson White of Tennessee emerged as the main Whig nominee in the South. White ran against the Force Bill, Jackson's actions in the Bank War, and Van Buren's unpopularity in the South. William Henry Harrison, who had gained national fame for his role in the Battle of Tippecanoe, established himself as the main Whig candidate in the North, although Daniel Webster also had the support of some Northern Whigs.

Van Buren won the election with 764,198 popular votes, 50.9 percent of the total, and 170 electoral votes. Harrison led the Whigs with 73 electoral votes, while White received 26, and Webster 14. Willie Person Mangum received the 11 electoral votes of South Carolina, which were awarded by the state legislature. Van Buren's victory resulted from a combination of his own attractive political and personal qualities, Jackson's popularity and endorsement, the organizational power of the Democratic Party, and the inability of the Whig Party to muster an effective candidate and campaign.

== Historical reputation ==
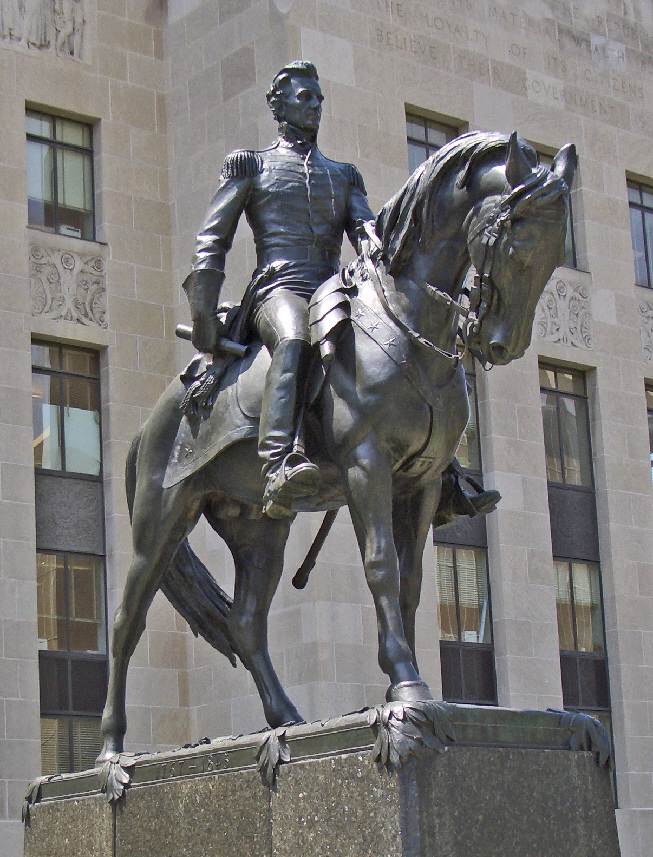
Equestrian statue of Gen. Jackson, Jackson County Courthouse, Kansas City, Missouri, commissioned by Judge Harry S. Truman

Jackson remains one of the most studied and controversial figures in American history. Historian Charles Grier Sellers says, "Andrew Jackson's masterful personality was enough by itself to make him one of the most controversial figures ever to stride across the American stage." There has never been universal agreement on Jackson's legacy, for "his opponents have ever been his most bitter enemies, and his friends almost his worshippers." He was always a fierce partisan, with many friends and many enemies. He has been lauded as the champion of the common man, while criticized for his treatment of Indians and for other matters. According to early biographer James Parton:

Andrew Jackson, I am given to understand, was a patriot and a traitor. He was one of the greatest generals, and wholly ignorant of the art of war. A brilliant writer, elegant, eloquent, without being able to compose a correct sentence or spell words of four syllables. The first of statesmen, he never devised, he never framed, a measure. He was the most candid of men, and was capable of the most profound dissimulation. A most law-defying law-obeying citizen. A stickler for discipline, he never hesitated to disobey his superior. A democratic autocrat. An urbane savage. An atrocious saint.

In the 20th century, Jackson was written about by many admirers. Arthur M. Schlesinger's Age of Jackson (1945) depicts Jackson as a man of the people battling inequality and upper-class tyranny. From the 1970s to the 1980s, Robert Remini published a three-volume biography of Jackson followed by an abridged one-volume study. Remini paints a generally favorable portrait of Jackson. He contends that Jacksonian democracy "stretches the concept of democracy about as far as it can go and still remain workable. ... As such it has inspired much of the dynamic and dramatic events of the nineteenth and twentieth centuries in American history—Populism, Progressivism, the New and Fair Deals, and the programs of the New Frontier and Great Society." To Remini, Jackson serves as "the embodiment of the new American...This new man was no longer British. He no longer wore the queue and silk pants. He wore trousers, and he had stopped speaking with a British accent." However, other 20th-century writers such as Richard Hofstadter and Bray Hammond depict Jackson as an advocate of the sort of laissez-faire capitalism that benefits the rich and oppresses the poor.

Brands observes that Jackson's reputation declined after the mid-20th century as his actions towards Indians and African Americans received new attention. After the civil rights movement, Brands writes, "his unrepentant ownership of slaves marked him as one to be censured rather than praised." Further, "By the turn of the present [21st] century, it was scarcely an exaggeration to say that the one thing American schoolchildren learned about Jackson was that he was the author of the Trail of Tears." Starting mainly around 1970, Jackson came under sharp attack from historians for his Indian removal policies. Howard Zinn called him "the most aggressive enemy of the Indians in early American history" and "exterminator of Indians." By contrast, Remini claims that, if not for Jackson's policies, the Southern tribes would have been totally wiped out, just like other tribes—namely, the Yamasee, Mahican, and Narragansett—which did not move.

Despite some criticism, Jackson's performance in office has generally been ranked highly in polls of historians and political scientists. His position in C-SPAN's poll of historians dropped from 13th in 2009 to 18th in 2017. Some associate this decline with the frequent praise Jackson has received from President Donald Trump, who hung Jackson's official portrait in the Oval Office. A 2018 poll of the American Political Science Association’s Presidents and Executive Politics section ranked Jackson as the fifteenth best president.

== See also ==
- John C. Calhoun § Vice presidency (1825–1832)
- Martin Van Buren § Jackson administration (1829–1837)
