= Edward W. North =

Mayor of Charleston from 1833 to 1836

31st Mayor of Charleston
- In office 1833–1836
- Preceded by: Henry L. Pinckney
- Succeeded by: Robert Y. Hayne

Personal details
- Born: c. 1778
- Died: May 15, 1843
- Spouse: Arabella Ann Dart (m. 1826)
- Education: University of Pennsylvania (1797)
- Profession: Physician

Edward W. North (c. 1778 - 1843) was the twenty-first mayor of Charleston, South Carolina, serving three consecutive terms from 1833 to 1836.

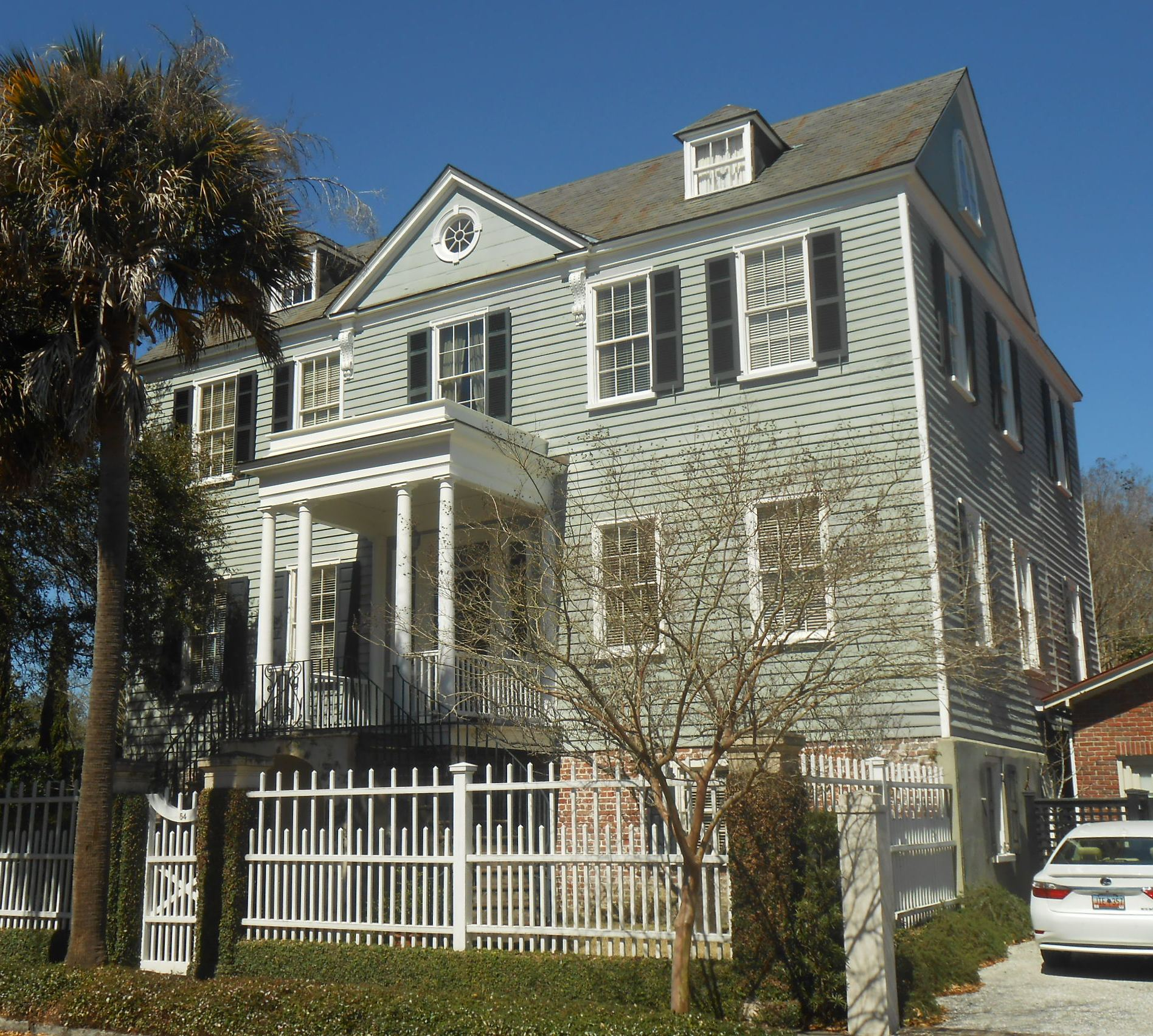
Edward North lived at 54 Montagu Street, Charleston, South Carolina, from 1826 upon marrying Arrabella Ann Dart, whose first husband had the house built between 1806 and 1809.

North was born in about 1778 and died on May 15, 1843.

Preceded by Henry L. Pinckney	Mayor of Charleston, South Carolina; 1833–1836	Succeeded by Robert Y. Hayne
