= 21st Rule =

Throughout the period before the American Civil War, petitions and memorials relating to the slavery question appeared in many records of the United States Congress. Between 1836 and 1844, the 21st rule of the U.S. House of Representatives (the so-called gag rule) provided that no petition relating to slavery would be entertained in any way; therefore, all such petitions and memorials received while this rule was in effect were tabled.

The rule, proposed by South Carolina Representative Henry L. Pinckney, was passed without any debate. During this period, hundreds of petitions relating to the abolition of slavery, slavery in the District of Columbia, fugitive slave laws and fugitive slaves, the admission of slave states, slavery in the territories, African colonization, and repeal of the 21st rule were tabled.

== Before the rule was adopted ==
In the 1830s, the American Anti-Slavery Society wanted to propose to Congress that it make an attempt toward abolishing slavery. As such, abolitionists across the country organized and eventually submitted over 130,000 petitions to the House of Representatives between 1831 and 1844. James Hammond, a representative from South Carolina, first proposed the idea of imposing a gag on all anti-slavery petitions. Future President James Polk, at that time a representative from Tennessee, tried to resolve this problem and put it in the hands of a special committee. The committee's chairman, Henry Pinckney, dealt with the matter by refusing to consider any of them, and making anything that involved slavery automatically tabled. In 1836, the 24th Congress adopted the well-known Gag Rule. This rule declared that all petitions regarding slavery must be approved before passed or "be laid on the table and that no further action whatever shall be laid thereon."

== Opposition ==
Many people disagreed with this rule. The Whigs were opposed; John Quincy Adams led a group of congressmen who wanted to get rid of the rule. Adams declared to everyone that he was not an abolitionist, but thought this rule violated the constitutional right to petition. The Gag Rule was going against the First Amendment, which gives everyone freedom of speech and the right to petition the government for redress of grievances.

Adams wanted to pass an amendment against the Gag Rule. When the Whigs took control of the house, Joseph R. Underwood of Kentucky proposed an amendment declaring that the old House rules prevailed, instead of getting rid of them after a certain number of days. This included the 21st rule. Adams was not so fond of the idea and proposed a whole new amendment against the Underwoods to get rid of the 21st Rule. It passed by eight votes, 112–104.

People who opposed Adams' ideas tried to kick him out of the House. They tried to take the chairmanship of the Congressional Committee Position from him. The first time Congress attempted to do this, they were unsuccessful. Everyone who opposed him tried again and the same result occurred.

== Adams' Plan ==
Adams kept on questioning Polk, and saying that the petitions sent out to create the Gag Rule could be alleged. When Polk failed to answer, Adams stated that everyone has the freedom of thought and action. Slavery should take a toll on one's patience, but if someone had a desire to question this act, it is covered by the law.

In January 1844, Adams and his committee finally eliminated the Gag Rule. The House was not so content with this decision and had a long discussion about it. Many still supported the Gag Rule and wanted the question voted. The vote ended up being 86–116 to bring the rule back. The House was still not satisfied and wanted to hold another poll, to see if the public wanted to reconsider the first vote on getting the Gag Rule back. This proposal also failed, 56–116. At last, on December 3, 1844, Congress finally agreed to rescind the Gag Rule. Adams' campaign had worked.

== See also ==
- Presidency of Andrew Jackson

== Sources ==
- Adams, John Quincy. "John Quincy Adams on the Gag Rule." Digital History, Digital History, 2019, www.digitalhistory.uh.edu/disp_textbook.cfm?smtID=3&psid=376.
- Records of the U.S. House of Representatives
- Miller, William Lee. Arguing about Slavery: the Great Battle in the United States Congress. A.A. Knopf, 1996.
