= James R. Pringle =

American politician

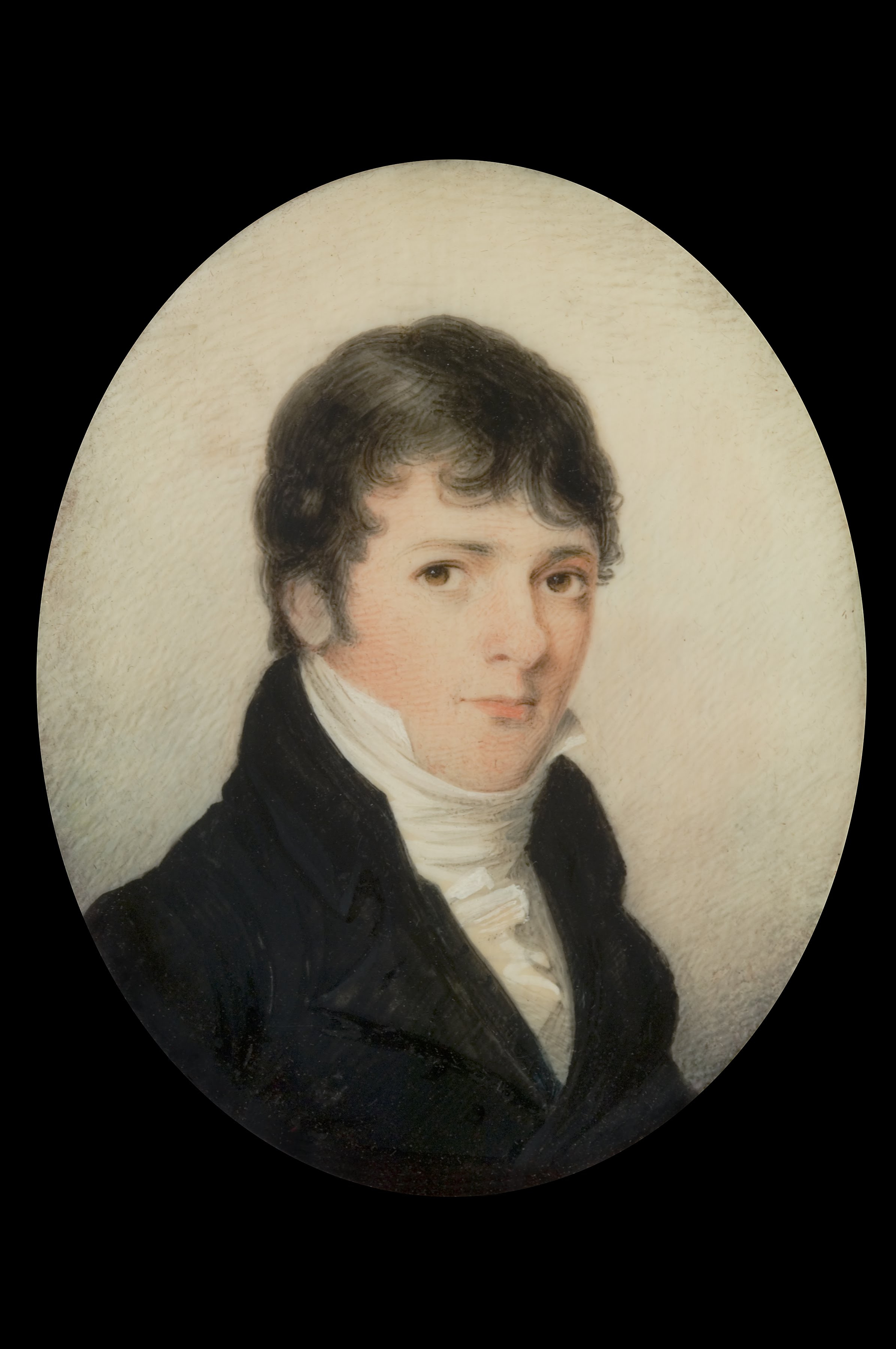
- Portrait miniature by Charles Fraser, c. 1803

30th Mayor of Charleston
- In office 1830–1831
- Preceded by: Henry L. Pinckney
- Succeeded by: Henry L. Pinckney

Personal details
- Born: James Reid Pringle; 1782
- Died: July 11, 1840 (aged 57–58)
- Spouse: Elizabeth Mary McPherson (m. 1807)

James Reid Pringle (1782 – July 11, 1840) was a central figure among Charleston's wealthy political and economic elite, leveraging his positions in local and federal government alongside his extensive activities as a prominent enslaver. He served as the 30th Intendant (Mayor) of Charleston, South Carolina (1830–1831), as President of the South Carolina Senate, and for over two decades held the powerful federal appointment of Collector of Customs for the Port of Charleston. He was the son of Robert Alexander Pringle and Mary Reid.

== Public and Political Career ==
Pringle represented Charleston's St. Philip and St. Michael parishes in the South Carolina General Assembly from 1808 to 1813. He then served three sessions in the South Carolina Senate from 1814 to 1819 and served as the president of the Senate starting in 1818. He resigned when he was appointed as United States Collector for the Port of Charleston in 1819.

He was elected intendant on September 6, 1830, in what was described as "one of the hottest elections ever contested in Charleston" in a race between the Unionists (Pringle) and Nullifiers (Henry L. Pinckney). Both candidates supported President Andrew Jackson, but the issue of nullification predominated the contest. The turnout for the election was thought to have been the highest ever for a municipal contest; Pringle secured 838 votes while Laurens got 754. He served a single term before being beaten by the same candidate, Henry L. Pinckney, in September 1831.

Pringle was nominated for another term as Collector of Customs for Charleston in January 1832 in anticipation of the end of his current term on January 29, 1832. He was nominated again for the same post in anticipation of the end of his current term on January 29, 1840.

== History as an Enslaver ==
Pringle's wealth and socio-political status were deeply intertwined with human bondage. He owned multiple rice plantations in the South Carolina low country, where he exploited enslaved labor to cultivate large-scale rice crops. Legal, census, and probate records document his long-term involvement in buying, holding, end exploiting enslaved captives.

=== James Reid Pringle's Enslavement Records (1820-1840) ===
Record Type / Date	Details of Enslavement Activity
Bill of Sale (February 19, 1820)	Purchased an enslaved woman named Amey for $400.
1820 US Census	Documented as holding 9 enslaved captives in Charleston.
1830 US Census	Documented as holding 19 enslaved captives in Charleston Ward 2.
Bill of Sale (March 15, 1836)	Purchased five enslaved captives named Amaritta, Lucy, Charleston, Minus, and Flora for $1,850.
Probate Inventory	After his death, his estate inventory listed 43 unnamed enslaved captives who were sold for a price of $400 each to settle his estate.

He died on July 11, 1840, and is buried in St. Michael's Episcopal churchyard, Charleston, Charleston County, South Carolina.

Preceded by Henry L. Pinckney	Mayor of Charleston, South Carolina; 1830–1831	Succeeded by Henry L. Pinckney
