= Gag rule =

Rule that limits discussion of a topic

A gag rule is a rule that limits or forbids the raising, consideration, or discussion of a particular topic, often but not always by members of a legislative or decision-making body. A famous example of gag rules is the series of rules concerning the discussion of slavery in effect in the U.S. House of Representatives from 1836 to 1844.

== By country ==
=== England ===
A gag rule may be formally neutral, that is, forbidding discussions or arguments either for or against a particular policy. For example, William Laud, the Archbishop of Canterbury during the reign of King Charles I of England:

forbade ministers to discuss the sublime mysteries associated with Calvin's doctrine of predestination. They could not preach it, nor could they preach against it. They could not mention it at all ... For Laud, what was at stake was not so much the promotion of his own theological opinions as the suppression of the furor theologicus that had caused so much devastation in England and throughout Europe in the aftermath of the Reformation.

However, in practice, the effect (and in most cases, the intent) of even an even-handed ban on advocating or opposing a particular policy will be to entrench the status quo.

=== Malaysia ===
A present-day example can be found in the Dewan Negara (Senate) of Malaysia, which has a standing order prohibiting any member from proposing the repeal of those articles of the Malaysian Constitution that reserve certain privileges for Bumiputra (such as ethnic Malay) citizens and questioning the status of Bahasa Malaysia as the national language.

=== United States ===
The slavery gag rule forbade the raising, consideration, or discussion of slavery in the U.S. House of Representatives from 1836 to 1844.

Related to abortion rights, the Mexico City Policy, which prohibits U.S. funding for organizations that provide abortions, referrals to abortion providers, and in some cases any family planning (birth control) information, is sometimes referred to as the "global gag rule".
