= The Age of Jackson =

1945 book by Arthur Schlesinger Jr.

- Pulitzer Prize in History 1946
- Author: Arthur Schlesinger Jr.
- Language: English
- Genre: Non-fiction
- Publisher: Little Brown & Co.
- Publication date: 1945
- Publication place: United States
- OCLC: 424677
- Dewey Decimal: 973.56
- LC Class: E381 .S38

The Age of Jackson is a book about the Jacksonian era of United States history that was written by Arthur Schlesinger Jr. The Age of Jackson won the Pulitzer Prize for History in 1946.

The Age of Jackson largely ignored the sectionalism of the antebellum United States and, "obviously influenced by the New Deal," Schlesinger focused on what he considered to be Jackson's appeal to the working class. One book reviewer recommended it as a "delightful piece of propaganda" in which Schlesinger skillfully created character portraits of the major personalities in the Jacksonian era. Another reviewer that found that minute detail withal, in Schlesinger's depiction of the period between 1828 and 1868 the central conflict was "privilege and nonprivilege, wealth and poverty, conservatism and radicalism." The Journal of Southern History reviewer credited Schlesinger with being at his "best in his chapters on Jacksonian democracy in relation to such matters as law, industrialism, literature, and religion."

== Influence ==
According to historian Edward Pessen, The Age of Jackson occupied "a special niche as perhaps the most influential of the large or overarching interpretations of Jacksonian politics." Well into the 1960s, endorsing or debunking Schlesinger's portrait of Jacksonism—which was "bathed in the warm light of New Deal progressivism"— became a central focus of interested historians. In the course of debunking Schlesinger's text, a "generation" of historians instead concluded that the "Jacksonians personified a reactionary, anti-intellectual, agrarian ideal."

Schlesinger's analysis has been criticized for its narrow focus. Howard Zinn, writing in the 1970s, commented on the historiography of Andrew Jackson in A People's History of the United States: "The leading books on the Jacksonian period, written by respected historians (The Age of Jackson by Arthur Schlesinger; The Jacksonian Persuasion by Marvin Meyers), do not mention Jackson's Indian policy, but there is much talk in them of tariffs, banking, political parties, political rhetoric. If you look through high school textbooks and elementary school textbooks in American history you will find Jackson the frontiersman, soldier, democrat, man of the people—not Jackson the slaveholder, land speculator, executioner of dissident soldiers, exterminator of Indians."

Pessen argued that "Many of the assertions in The Age of Jackson are indeed challengeable: 'The people called him [Jackson], and he came, like the great folk heroes, to lead them out of captivity and bondage,' it states at one point. The unsuspecting would never guess from this phrase that the Jacksonians were ardent supporters rather than opponents of the actual system of slavery in antebellum America." In 1986 William G. Shade noted that "Schlesinger completely ignored Jackson's Indian policy. Given the space devoted to it by Jackson in his public messages, the time spent and the roll calls taken in Congress, and the rivers of ink spilled in the press, one might argue that Jackson's presidency can be best characterized by the revolution it brought in federal policy toward the Indians. Although opposed by the Supreme Court, Congress passed laws in 1830 and 1834 to remove the Indians west of the Mississippi. The Jackson administration renegotiated 95 treaties and established a Bureau of Indian Affairs that would proceed on to a career of corruption in the name of reform." Other historians who have deconstructed Schlesinger's theses include Bray Hammond, Lee Benson, Richard P. McCormick, Joseph Dorfman, and Richard B. Morris, et al.

In 1976 Daniel Formisano argued that Schlesinger's depiction of the Bank War, in which Jackson boldly struggled with a "money monster" has "continued to lose its character as a heroic moment." Instead, many historians assign heavy blame to Jacksonian financial policies for "the disordered economy that plagued the United States throughout the rest of the century..."

In response to a feature on Jackson, Schlesinger wrote a letter to the Wilson Quarterly in 1986 describing what he perceived as a generation-long historiographic conflict between Jackson as "great champion of entrepreneurial capitalism" and Jackson the politician as holder of a "conviction of the corrupting effects of commerce, especially paper-money banking, on republican virtue." Schlesinger also credited Jackson with modeling a more powerful executive branch.

== Sources ==
- Cole, Donald B. (September 1985). "Honoring Andrew Jackson Before All Other Living Men". Reviews in American History. 13 (3). Baltimore, Maryland: The Johns Hopkins University Press: 359–366. doi:10.2307/2702090. ISSN 0048-7511. JSTOR 2702090.
- Egerton, Douglas R. (1987). "An Update on Jacksonian Historiography: The Biographies". Tennessee Historical Quarterly. 46 (2): 79–85. ISSN 0040-3261.
- Formisano, Ronald P. (1976). "Toward a Reorientation of Jacksonian Politics: A Review of the Literature, 1959-1975". The Journal of American History. 63 (1): 42–65. doi:10.2307/1908989. ISSN 0021-8723. JSTOR 1908989.
- Pessen, Edward (1985). Jacksonian America: society, personality and politics. Illini Books (Rev. ed.). Urbana: University of Illinois Press. ISBN 978-0-252-01237-2.
- Shade, William G. (1986). "Politics and Parties in Jacksonian America". The Pennsylvania Magazine of History and Biography. 110 (4): 483–507. ISSN 0031-4587. JSTOR 20092042.
- Zinn, Howard (2021) [1980]. A People's History of the United States (Harper Perennial Modern Classics Digital ed.). New York: HarperCollins Publishers. ISBN 978-0-06-246667-9.
