= Henry L. Pinckney =

American politician

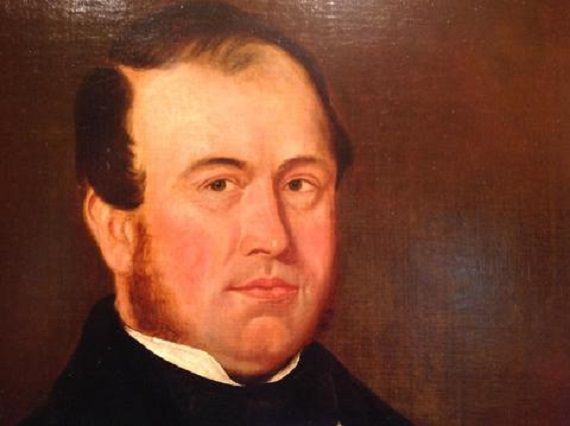

29th Mayor of Charleston, South Carolina
- In office September 4, 1837 – September 7, 1840
- Preceded by: Robert Young Hayne
- Succeeded by: Jacob F. Mintzing
- In office September 5, 1831 – September 2, 1833 as Intendant
- Preceded by: James R. Pringle
- Succeeded by: Edward W. North
- In office September 7, 1829 – September 6, 1830 as Intendant
- Preceded by: John Gadsden
- Succeeded by: James R. Pringle

Member of the U.S. House of Representatives from South Carolina's 1st district
- In office March 4, 1833 – March 3, 1837
- Preceded by: William Drayton
- Succeeded by: Hugh S. Legaré

18th Speaker of the South Carolina House of Representatives
- In office November 22, 1830 – March 4, 1833
- Governor: James Hamilton Jr. Robert Young Hayne
- Preceded by: Benjamin Faneuil Dunkin
- Succeeded by: Patrick Noble

Member of the South Carolina House of Representatives from St. Philip's and St. Michael's Parish
- In office November 22, 1830 – March 4, 1833
- In office November 25, 1816 – January 30, 1828

Personal details
- Born: Henry Laurens Pinckney; September 24, 1794 Charleston, South Carolina, United States
- Died: February 3, 1863 (aged 68) Charleston, South Carolina, Confederate States
- Party: Nullifier
- Spouse: Harriet Lee Post
- Education: South Carolina College
- Profession: journalist, politician

Henry Laurens Pinckney (September 24, 1794 – February 3, 1863) was a U.S. representative from South Carolina, and the son of Charles Pinckney and Mary Eleanor Laurens.

Born in Charleston, South Carolina, Pinckney attended private schools. He graduated from South Carolina College (now the University of South Carolina) at Columbia in 1812. He studied law and was admitted to the bar and commenced practice in Charleston.

Pinckney served as a member of the South Carolina House of Representatives (1816–1832). He founded the Charleston Mercury in 1819 and was its sole editor for fifteen years. Between 1829 and 1840, he served six terms as intendant or mayor of Charleston. In 1838, he won among a field of four candidates with the following votes: Pinckney (600), Col. James Lynah (575), Dr. Joseph Johnston (203), and Dr. J.W. Schmidt (141).

Pinckney was elected as a Nullifier to the Twenty-third and Twenty-fourth Congresses (March 4, 1833 – March 3, 1837). He was an unsuccessful candidate for renomination in 1836, having been labelled a "traitor" by ultra-conservative Southerners for compromising with New York's Martin van Buren on the 1836 "gag-rule" bill.

Pinckney served as collector of the port of Charleston in 1841 and 1842 and as the tax collector of St. Philip's and St. Michael's parishes (1845–1863).

Pinckney married Harriet Lee Post, the daughter of Chaplain of the Senate Reuben Post and Harriet Moffitt, a granddaughter of Richard Henry Lee. He died in Charleston, South Carolina on February 3, 1863 (during the time when South Carolina had seceded and joined the Confederate States).

== Sources ==
- United States Congress. "Henry L. Pinckney (id: P000355)". Biographical Directory of the United States Congress.

Political offices
Preceded by Robert Young Hayne	Mayor of Charleston, South Carolina; 1837–1840	Succeeded by Jacob F. Mintzing
Preceded by James R. Pringle	Mayor of Charleston, South Carolina; 1831–1833	Succeeded by Edward W. North
Preceded by John Gadsden	Mayor of Charleston, South Carolina; 1829–1830	Succeeded by James R. Pringle
U.S. House of Representatives
Preceded by William Drayton	Member of the U.S. House of Representatives from South Carolina's 1st congressional district 1833–1837	Succeeded by Hugh S. Legaré
