= Compact theory =

United States foundational philosophy

In United States constitutional theory, compact theory is an interpretation of the Constitution which asserts the United States was formed through a compact agreed upon by all the states, and that the federal government is thus a creation of the states. Consequently, under the theory, states are the final arbiters over whether the federal government has overstepped the limits of its authority as set forth in the compact. Compact theory contrasts with contract theory, which holds that the United States was formed with the consent of the people—rather than the consent of the states—and thus the federal government has supreme jurisdiction over the states. Compact theory has never been upheld by the courts.

Compact theory featured heavily in arguments by southern political leaders in the run up to the American Civil War that states had a right to nullify federal law and to secede from the union. It also featured in southern arguments opposing desegregation after the 1954 Supreme Court decision in Brown v. Board of Education. The theory also entered into the Mexico–United States border crisis of the early 2020s.

== Supreme Court rulings ==
The U.S. Supreme Court has rejected the idea that the Constitution is a compact among the states. Rather, the Court has stated that the Constitution was established directly by the people of the United States, not by the states. In one of the Supreme Court's first significant decisions, Chisholm v. Georgia (1793), Chief Justice John Jay stated that the Constitution was established directly by the people. Jay noted the language of the Preamble of the Constitution, which states that the Constitution was ordained and established by "We the people," and he stated: "Here we see the people acting as sovereigns of the whole country, and, in the language of sovereignty, establishing a Constitution by which it was their will that the State governments should be bound."

This view has been repeatedly affirmed by the Court. In Martin v. Hunter's Lessee (1816), the Supreme Court explicitly rejected the idea that the Constitution is a compact among the states: "The Constitution of the United States was ordained and established not by the States in their sovereign capacities, but emphatically, as the preamble of the Constitution declares, by 'the people of the United States.'" The Court contrasted the earlier Articles of Confederation with the Constitution, characterized the Articles of Confederation as a compact among states, and stated that the Constitution was established by not the states but the people. Likewise, in McCulloch v. Maryland (1819), the Supreme Court stated that the federal Constitution proceeded directly from the people and was not created by the states. It stated that the Constitution was binding on and could not be negated by the states. It again contrasted the Articles of Confederation, which was established by the states, to the Constitution, which was established by the people. After the Civil War, in Texas v. White (1869), a case discussing the legal status of the southern states that had attempted to secede, the Supreme Court stated that the union was not merely a compact among states but was "something more than a compact."

== Arguments in favor ==
Leading proponents of this view of the U.S. Constitution primarily originated from Virginia and other southern states. Notable proponents of the theory include Thomas Jefferson. Under this theory and in reaction to the Alien and Sedition Acts of 1798, Jefferson claimed the federal government overstepped its authority, and advocated nullification of the laws by the states. The first resolution of the Kentucky Resolutions began by stating:

Resolved, that the several States composing the United States of America, are not united on the principles of unlimited submission to their General Government; but that by compact under the style and title of a Constitution for the United States and of amendments thereto, they constituted a General Government for special purposes, delegated to that Government certain definite powers, reserving each State to itself, the residuary mass of right to their own self Government; and that whensoever the General Government assumes undelegated powers, its acts are unauthoritative, void, and of no force; that to this compact each state acceded as a state, and is an integral party; that the Government created by this compact was not made the exclusive or final judge of the extent of the powers delegated to itself; since that would have made its discretion, and not the Constitution, the measure of its powers; but that, as in all other cases of compact among powers having no common judge, each party has an equal right to judge for itself, as well of infractions as of the mode and measure of redress.

Meanwhile, James Madison had asserted in Federalist No. 39 that "the people" were "not as individuals composing one entire nation, but as composing the distinct and independent States to which they respectively belong"; the Constitution was "to be the assent and ratification of the several States, derived from the supreme authority in each State, the authority of the people themselves"; and "the act of the people, as forming so many independent States, not as forming one aggregate nation, is obvious from this single consideration." Likewise, as noted in Article VII of the Constitution, ratification took place not by a single popular convention but conventions of only the ratifying states and would carry the Constitution into effect only between those ratifying states.

== Arguments against ==
Others have taken the position that the federal government is not a compact among the states but was instead formed directly by the people in their exercise of their sovereign power. The people determined that the federal government should be superior to the states. Under this view, the states are not parties to the Constitution and do not have the right to determine for themselves the proper scope of federal authority but instead are bound by the determinations of the federal government. The state of Vermont took that position in response to the Kentucky Resolutions. Daniel Webster advocated that view in his debate with Robert Hayne in the Senate in 1830:

[I]t cannot be shown, that the Constitution is a compact between State governments. The Constitution itself, in its very front, refutes that idea; it, declares that it is ordained and established by the people of the United States. So far from saying that it is established by the governments of the several States, it does not even say that it is established by the people of the several States; but it pronounces that it is established by the people of the United States, in the aggregate.... When the gentleman says the Constitution is a compact between the States, he uses language exactly applicable to the old Confederation. He speaks as if he were in Congress before 1789. He describes fully that old state of things then existing. The Confederation was, in strictness, a compact; the States, as States, were parties to it. We had no other general government. But that was found insufficient, and inadequate to the public exigencies. The people were not satisfied with it, and undertook to establish a better. They undertook to form a general government, which should stand on a new basis; not a confederacy, not a league, not a compact between States, but a Constitution; a popular government, founded in popular election, directly responsible to the people themselves, and divided into branches with prescribed limits of power, and prescribed duties. They ordained such a government, they gave it the name of a Constitution, therein they established a distribution of powers between this, their general government, and their several State governments.

The leading 19th-century commentary on the Constitution, Justice Joseph Story's Commentaries on the Constitution of the United States (1833), likewise rejected the compact theory and concluded that the Constitution was established directly by the people, not the states, and that it constitutes supreme law, not a mere compact.

== Influence on American Civil War ==
In the years before the Civil War, the compact theory was used by southern states to argue that they had a right to nullify federal law and to secede from the union. For example, during the Nullification Crisis of 1828-1832, John C. Calhoun argued in his South Carolina Exposition and Protest that the states, as the parties to a compact, had the right to judge for themselves whether the terms of the compact were being honored. Calhoun described this "right of judging" as "an essential attribute of sovereignty," which the states retained when the Constitution was formed. Calhoun said the states had the right to nullify, or veto, any laws that were inconsistent with the compact.

When the southern states seceded in 1860-61, they relied on the compact theory to justify secession and argued that the northern states had violated the compact by undermining and attacking the institution of slavery and the slaveholders' property rights. The Southern states stated that they were therefore justified in withdrawing from the compact among the states.

Former Confederate President Jefferson Davis was an avid supporter of the Compact theory, and devoted large portions of his two volume book "The Rise and Fall of the Confederate Government" to explaining the Compact Theory. Still concerned that people would not understand what the Compact Theory was, he wrote a second book, "A Short History of the Confederate States of America", to explain it once more.

== Mexico–United States border crisis ==
During the Mexico–United States border crisis of 2023-24, Republican Texas governor Greg Abbott asserted the federal government had "broken the compact" by not acting adequately to end what he characterized as an "invasion" of migrants. He ordered the Texas National Guard to secure the state's southern border. The Biden administration Justice Department wrote Abbott in July 2023 to assert he was exceeding his authority. A three-judge panel of the Fifth Circuit Court of Appeals ruled in December 2023 that Texas must remove 1,000 feet of floating barrier the state had placed in the Rio Grande river earlier in the year. The United States Supreme Court in January ruled 5-4 that the federal Border Control could remove razor wire that the Texas National Guard had installed. Abbott responded that the ruling infringed on state sovereignty and that Texas had a right to secure the border that superseded federal authority. Abbott's argument was nearly identical to that of the 1860 South Carolina Declaration of Secession. Abbott then sought to impede border patrol agents, precipitating the Standoff at Eagle Pass. Twenty-five of 26 Republican governors and Republican Speaker of the House Mike Johnson supported Abbott's position. The conflict set the stage for a potential constitutional crisis.

== See also ==
- Anti-Federalism
- Classical republicanism
- Decentralization
- Interposition
- Jeffersonian democracy
- Social contract
- States' rights
