= States' rights (disambiguation) =

States' rights in the United States of America are political powers reserved for the U.S. state governments rather than the federal government.

States' Rights, States Rights, or state rights may also refer to:

- States' rights distribution, film copyright holders sell rights on a territorial basis with a copy of the film
- States' Rights Party (disambiguation), various U.S. political parties, typically opposed to federal civil rights programs
- States' rights speech, given by Ronald Reagan during his 1980 election campaign
- States Rights Records, Oregon independent record label
- States Rights Gist (1831–64) South Carolina Confederate Army officer
- Slavery and States' Rights, speech by Joseph Wheeler on July 31, 1894

== See also ==
- Balance of power (federalism), the same idea for other federal countries
- Public international law, discusses rights of independent states, including
  - Right to exist
  - Self-determination
  - Sovereignty
- Subsidiarity (European Union), a similar principle in the European Union
