= Nullification (U.S. law) =

Legal theory in U.S. constitutional law

Nullification, in United States constitutional history, is a legal theory that a state has the right to nullify, or invalidate, any federal laws that they deem unconstitutional with respect to the United States Constitution (as opposed to the state's own constitution). There are similar theories that any officer, jury, or individual may do the same. The theory of state nullification has never been legally upheld by federal courts.

The theory of nullification is based on a view that the states formed the Union by an agreement (or "compact") among the states, and that as creators of the federal government, the states have the final authority to determine the limits of the power of that government. Under this, the compact theory, the states and not the federal courts are the ultimate interpreters of the extent of the federal government's power. Under this theory, the states therefore may reject, or nullify, federal laws that the states believe are beyond the federal government's constitutional powers. The related idea of interposition is a theory that a state has the right and the duty to "interpose" itself when the federal government enacts laws that the state believes to be unconstitutional. Thomas Jefferson and James Madison set forth the theories of nullification and interposition in the Kentucky and Virginia Resolutions in 1798.

Courts at the state and federal level, including the U.S. Supreme Court, have repeatedly rejected the theory of nullification. The courts have decided that under the Supremacy Clause of the Constitution, federal law is superior to state law, and that under Article III of the Constitution, the federal judiciary has the final power to interpret the Constitution. Therefore, the power to make final decisions about the constitutionality of federal laws lies with the federal courts, not the states, and the states do not have the power to nullify federal laws.

Between 1798 and the beginning of the Civil War in 1861, several states threatened or attempted nullification of various federal laws. None of these efforts were legally upheld. The Kentucky and Virginia Resolutions were rejected by the other states. The Supreme Court rejected nullification attempts in a series of decisions in the 19th century, including Ableman v. Booth, which rejected Wisconsin's attempt to nullify the Fugitive Slave Act. The Civil War ended most nullification efforts.

In the 1950s, southern states attempted to use nullification and interposition to prevent integration of their schools. These attempts failed when the Supreme Court again rejected nullification in Cooper v. Aaron, explicitly holding that the states may not nullify federal law.

== The Constitution and the theory of nullification ==
=== Provisions of the Constitution ===
The Constitution does not contain any clause expressly providing that the states have the power to declare federal laws unconstitutional.

Supporters of nullification have argued that the states' power of nullification is inherent in the nature of the federal system. They have argued that before the Constitution was ratified, the states essentially were separate nations. Under this theory, the Constitution is a contract, or "compact", among the states by which the states delegated certain powers to the federal government while reserving all other powers to themselves. The states, as parties to the compact, retained the inherent right to judge compliance with the compact. According to supporters of nullification, if the states determine that the federal government has exceeded its delegated powers, the states may declare federal laws unconstitutional. Nullification supporters argue that the power to declare federal laws unconstitutional not only is inherent in the concept of state sovereignty but also is one of the powers reserved to the states by the Tenth Amendment.

This view of the Constitution has been rejected by the federal courts, which consistently have held that under the Constitution, the states do not have the power to nullify federal laws. The courts have rejected the compact theory, finding that the Constitution was not a contract among the states. Rather, the Constitution was established directly by the people, as stated in the preamble: "We the people of the United States ..." The people made the federal government superior to the states in certain ways. Under the Supremacy Clause of Article VI, the Constitution and federal laws made in pursuance thereof are "the supreme law of the land ... anything in the constitution or laws of any state to the contrary notwithstanding." The courts have held that federal laws are therefore superior to state laws and cannot be negated by the states. Federal laws are valid and are controlling, so long as those laws were adopted in pursuance of—that is, consistent with—the Constitution. Determining whether a federal law is consistent with the Constitution requires interpretation of the law, which is inherently a judicial function. The federal judicial power granted by Article III of the Constitution gives the federal courts authority over all cases "arising under this Constitution [or] the laws of the United States". The federal courts, therefore, have been given the power to determine whether federal laws are consistent with the Constitution, with the Supreme Court having final authority.

Thus, the federal courts have held that under the Constitution, federal law is controlling over state law, and the final power to determine whether federal laws are unconstitutional has been delegated to the federal courts. The courts therefore have held that the states do not have the power to nullify federal law.

=== The Constitutional Convention and state ratifying conventions ===
The concept of nullification of federal law by the states was not discussed at the Constitutional Convention. The records of the Constitutional Convention therefore do not provide support for the theory of nullification.

On the other hand, the records of the Convention support the idea that the power to declare federal laws unconstitutional lies in the federal courts. At least fifteen Constitutional Convention delegates from nine states spoke about the power of the federal courts to declare federal laws unconstitutional. For example, George Mason said that under the Constitution, federal judges "could declare an unconstitutional law void". James Madison said: "A law violating a constitution established by the people themselves, would be considered by the Judges as null & void." Elbridge Gerry said that the power of federal judges to interpret federal laws includes "a power of deciding on their constitutionality".

Several of the Convention delegates said that the federal courts would have the power to determine disputes between the federal government and the states. Charles Pinckney referred to federal judges as "Umpires between the U. States and the individual States". John Rutledge indicated that the Supreme Court would "judge between the U.S. and particular states". These statements indicated that the Supreme Court would have final authority in constitutional disputes between the federal government and the states.

The records of the state ratifying conventions do not include any assertions that the states would have the power to nullify federal laws. It has been argued that certain statements in the Virginia ratifying convention, although not asserting a right of nullification, articulated a basis for the compact theory. Edmund Randolph and George Nicholas stated that Virginia's ratification of the Constitution would constitute its agreement to a contract, and that if Virginia were to state its understanding at the time of ratification that the federal government could exercise only its delegated powers, this understanding would become part of the contract and would be binding on the federal government. These statements implied a belief that Virginia, as a party to the contract, would have a right to judge the constitutional limits of federal power.

The records of the state ratifying conventions include over three dozen statements in more than half the states asserting that the federal courts would have the power to declare laws unconstitutional. For example, Luther Martin's letter to the Maryland ratifying convention asserted that the power to declare laws unconstitutional could be exercised solely by the federal courts, and that the states would be bound by federal court decisions: "Whether, therefore, any laws or regulations of the Congress, any acts of its President or other officers, are contrary to, or not warranted by, the Constitution, rests only with the judges, who are appointed by Congress, to determine; by whose determinations every state must be bound." John Marshall said in the Virginia convention that protection against infringement of the Constitution would be provided by the federal courts: "If [Congress] were to make a law not warranted by any of the powers enumerated, it would be considered by the [federal] judges as an infringement of the Constitution which they are to guard. ... They would declare it void. ... To what quarter will you look for protection from an infringement on the Constitution, if you will not give the power to the judiciary? There is no other body that can afford such a protection."

In short, there were no statements in the Constitutional Convention or the state ratifying conventions asserting that the states would have the power to nullify federal laws. On the other hand, the records of these conventions support the idea that the power to declare federal laws unconstitutional lies in the federal courts.

=== The Federalist Papers ===
The Federalist Papers do not say that the states have the power to nullify federal law. On the contrary, they say that the power to declare laws unconstitutional is delegated to federal courts, not the states.

Federalist No. 33 states that federal laws are supreme over the states, so long as those laws are within the federal government's delegated powers.

Federalist No. 39 directly addresses the question of who is to decide whether the federal government has exceeded its delegated powers and has infringed on the states' reserved powers. It explains that under the Constitution, this issue is to be decided by the Supreme Court, not the states: "[The federal government's] jurisdiction extends to certain enumerated objects only, and leaves to the several States a residuary and inviolable sovereignty over all other objects. It is true that in controversies relating to the boundary between the two jurisdictions, the tribunal which is ultimately to decide, is to be established under the general [i.e. federal] government. ... Some such tribunal is clearly essential to prevent an appeal to the sword and a dissolution of the compact; and that it ought to be established under the general rather than under the local governments, or, to speak more properly, that it could be safely established under the first alone, is a position not likely to be combated."

Federalist No. 44 discusses the role of the states in checking actions of Congress that exceed its delegated powers. According to Federalist No. 44, the role of the states is to "sound the alarm" regarding any unconstitutional exercise of power by Congress, and to assist in electing new representatives to Congress. Federalist No. 44 does not imply that the states have the power to legally nullify federal law, although this would have been an appropriate context in which to mention it if such a power were thought to exist.

Federalist No. 78 says that the federal courts have the power "to pronounce legislative acts void, because contrary to the Constitution".

Federalist No. 80 asserts that the final authority to interpret the Constitution and federal law lies in the federal courts, not the states, because of the need for uniformity. Likewise, Federalist No. 22 says that the federal courts should interpret federal law due to the need for uniformity.

Federalist No. 82 says that because of the need for uniformity and the federal government's need to effectively enforce its laws, the Constitution gives the Supreme Court the power to review decisions of state courts in cases arising under the Constitution or federal law.

The Federalist Papers therefore indicate that the power to declare federal laws unconstitutional lies in the federal courts, not in the states.

== The Kentucky and Virginia Resolutions ==
The earliest assertion of the theories of nullification and interposition is found in the Kentucky and Virginia Resolutions of 1798, which were a protest against the Alien and Sedition Acts. In these resolutions, authors Thomas Jefferson and James Madison argued that "the states" have the right to interpret the Constitution and can declare federal laws unconstitutional when the federal government exceeds its delegated powers. These resolutions are considered the foundational documents of the theories of nullification and interposition.

The Kentucky Resolutions of 1798, written by Jefferson, asserted that the states formed the Constitution as a compact, delegating certain specified powers to the federal government and reserving all other powers to themselves. Each state, as a party to the compact, has a "right to judge for itself" the extent of the federal government's powers. When the federal government acts beyond the scope of its delegated powers, a state may determine that the federal government's "acts are unauthoritative, void, and of no force". The Kentucky Resolutions of 1798 called on the other states to join Kentucky "in declaring these acts void and of no force" and "in requesting their repeal at the next session of Congress".

The Kentucky Resolutions of 1799 added the assertion that when a federal law is unconstitutional, the remedy is "nullification" of the law by "the several states". The Kentucky Resolutions of 1799 did not assert that Kentucky would unilaterally refuse to enforce, or prevent enforcement of, the Alien and Sedition Acts. Rather, these resolutions declared that Kentucky "will bow to the laws of the Union" but would continue "to oppose in a constitutional manner" the Alien and Sedition Acts. The resolutions stated that Kentucky was entering its "solemn protest" against those Acts. The author of the Kentucky Resolutions of 1799 is not known with certainty.

The Virginia Resolutions of 1798, written by Madison, did not mention nullification. Rather, they introduced the idea of "interposition". The Virginia Resolutions asserted that when the federal government engages in "a deliberate, palpable, and dangerous exercise" of powers not granted by the Constitution, "the states, who are parties thereto, have the right, and are in duty bound, to interpose, for arresting the progress of the evil, and for maintaining, within their respective limits, the authorities, rights and liberties, appertaining to them". The Virginia Resolutions did not explain what form this "interposition" might take. The Virginia Resolutions appealed to the other states for agreement and cooperation in opposing the Alien and Sedition Acts.

The Kentucky and Virginia Resolutions did not attempt to prohibit enforcement of the Alien and Sedition Acts within the borders of those states. Rather, these resolutions declared that the legislatures of these states viewed the Alien and Sedition Acts as unconstitutional, called for the repeal of these Acts, and requested the support and cooperation of the other states.

The Kentucky and Virginia Resolutions were not accepted by any of the other states. Rather, ten states rejected the Resolutions, with seven states formally transmitting their rejections to Kentucky and Virginia and three other states passing resolutions expressing disapproval. At least six states responded to the Resolutions by taking the position that the constitutionality of acts of Congress is a question for the federal courts, not the state legislatures. For example, Vermont's resolution stated: "That the General Assembly of the state of Vermont do highly disapprove of the resolutions of the General Assembly of Virginia, as being unconstitutional in their nature, and dangerous in their tendency. It belongs not to state legislatures to decide on the constitutionality of laws made by the general government; this power being exclusively vested in the judiciary courts of the Union."

Virginia responded to the criticism of the other states by issuing the Report of 1800, written by Madison. The Report of 1800 affirmed and defended the Virginia Resolutions. The Report of 1800 also said that a declaration of unconstitutionality by the states would be only an expression of opinion designed to spur debate, rather than having the authoritative effect of a federal court decision. During the Nullification Crisis of the 1830s, Madison denounced as unconstitutional the concept of nullification of federal law by a state. Madison wrote, "But it follows, from no view of the subject, that a nullification of a law of the U.S. can as is now contended, belong rightfully to a single State, as one of the parties to the Constitution; the State not ceasing to avow its adherence to the Constitution. A plainer contradiction in terms, or a more fatal inlet to anarchy, cannot be imagined."

== Nullification attempts in the 19th century ==
=== The Peters case ===
The Supreme Court first dealt with nullification in 1809 in the case of United States v. Peters, 9 U.S. (5 Cranch) 115 (1809). The Court rejected the idea of nullification. The Pennsylvania legislature had passed an act purporting to nullify a federal court's decision. The Pennsylvania statute stated that the federal court had acted unconstitutionally because it did not have jurisdiction, and that the federal court's judgment "was null and void". The Supreme Court held that the Pennsylvania legislature did not have the power to nullify the federal court's judgment, stating: "If the legislatures of the several States may, at will, annul the judgments of the courts of the United States, and destroy the rights acquired under those judgments, the Constitution itself becomes a solemn mockery, and the nation is deprived of the means of enforcing its laws by the instrumentality of its own tribunals."

In response, the Governor of Pennsylvania called out the state militia to prevent enforcement of the Supreme Court's judgment. However, the U.S. Marshal summoned a posse, carried out the Supreme Court's order, and arrested the leaders of the state militia. The Pennsylvania legislature passed a resolution declaring the action of the Supreme Court unconstitutional, invoking states' rights, and appealing to the other states for support. Eleven states responded by disapproving Pennsylvania's attempted nullification. No state supported Pennsylvania. The Governor of Pennsylvania made a plea to President James Madison to intervene, but Madison affirmed the authority of the Supreme Court. The Pennsylvania legislature backed down and withdrew the militia. Thus, Pennsylvania's attempt to nullify the federal court judgment failed.

=== New England's protests against federal authority ===
Several New England states objected to the Embargo Act of 1807, which restricted foreign trade. The Massachusetts legislature passed a resolution stating that the embargo "is, in the opinion of the legislature, in many respects, unjust, oppressive and unconstitutional, and not legally binding on the citizens of this state". The Massachusetts resolution did not purport to nullify the Embargo Act, but instead stated that "the judicial courts are competent to decide this question, and to them every citizen, when aggrieved, ought to apply for redress". Massachusetts called on Congress to repeal the act, and proposed several constitutional amendments. Connecticut passed a resolution declaring that the act was unconstitutional and declaring that state officials would not "assist, or concur in giving effect to the aforesaid unconstitutional act". Connecticut joined in the call for constitutional amendments. Neither Massachusetts nor Connecticut attempted to ban enforcement of the act within the state. A federal district court ruled in 1808 that the Embargo Act was constitutional. Congress repealed the Embargo Act in 1809 because it had been ineffective in achieving its goal of bringing economic pressure on Britain and France. Neither state attempted to block enforcement of the Embargo Act, so nullification did not come to a legal test.

The War of 1812 was harmful to New England's commercial interests and was unpopular in New England. The New England states objected to putting their state militias under federal control, arguing that the Constitution did not give the federal government authority over state militias in those circumstances. There was some discussion in New England about making a separate peace with Britain or even seceding from the Union. At the Hartford Convention of 1814, delegates from several New England states met to discuss their disagreements with the federal government's policies. The final report and resolutions from the Hartford Convention asserted that "acts of Congress in violation of the Constitution are absolutely void" and asserted the right of a state "to interpose its authority" to protect against unconstitutional government action. The final resolutions did not attempt to ban enforcement of any act of Congress. Rather, the resolutions recommended to state legislatures that they protect their citizens from unconstitutional federal action, called on the federal government to fund the defense of New England, and proposed a series of amendments to the Constitution. No state legislature followed up by attempting to nullify a federal act. The end of the war made the issue moot.

=== Virginia's opposition to Supreme Court review ===
In 1813, the Supreme Court reversed a decision of the Virginia Court of Appeals, basing its decision on the terms of a federal treaty. The Virginia Court of Appeals refused to accept the Supreme Court's decision, stating that under the Constitution, the Supreme Court did not have authority over state courts. The Virginia court held that as a matter of state sovereignty, its decisions were final and could not be appealed to the U.S. Supreme Court. The Virginia court found unconstitutional the federal statute providing for Supreme Court review of state court judgments. This decision would have allowed each state's courts to decide for themselves whether federal actions were unconstitutional, effectively giving state courts the right to nullify federal law. In Martin v. Hunter's Lessee, 14 U.S. (1 Wheat.) 304 (1816), the Supreme Court rejected this view. The Supreme Court held that Article III of the Constitution gives the federal courts jurisdiction in all cases arising under the Constitution or federal law, and gives the Supreme Court final authority in such cases. The Supreme Court stated that the people, by providing in the Constitution that the Supreme Court has final authority in such cases, had chosen to limit the sovereignty of the states. The Supreme Court therefore found that the federal courts, not the states, have the final power to interpret the Constitution.

Virginia again challenged the Supreme Court's authority in Cohens v. Virginia, 19 U.S. (6 Wheat.) 264 (1821). The question was whether the Supreme Court had authority to hear an appeal in a criminal case decided by a state court based on violation of a state law, where the defense was based on federal law. The Virginia legislature passed resolutions declaring that the Supreme Court had no authority over it due to principles of state sovereignty. The Supreme Court held that under Article III of the Constitution, the federal courts have jurisdiction over all cases involving the Constitution or federal law, including state cases in which a federal defense arises. Because the defendants in the case claimed that their actions were authorized by a federal statute, there was a disputed issue of federal law and the Supreme Court had authority to review the state court's judgment. Thus, the Supreme Court again found that the final power to interpret federal law lies in the federal courts, not the states.

These two cases established the principle that the federal courts, not the states, have the final power to interpret the Constitution and to determine the Constitutional limits of federal power. These cases rejected the state's attempt to determine the limits of federal power.

=== Ohio and the Bank of the United States ===
In 1819, Ohio imposed a tax on the federally chartered Bank of the United States. The Supreme Court already had ruled that such taxes were unconstitutional in McCulloch v. Maryland, 17 U.S. (4 Wheat.) 316 (1819). Despite the Supreme Court's ruling, Ohio seized $100,000 from the Bank to satisfy the tax. Ohio passed resolutions declaring that it did not accept the result of the McCulloch case and denying that the Supreme Court had the final authority to interpret the Constitution. The Ohio legislature's resolutions, relying on the Kentucky and Virginia Resolutions, asserted that the states "have an equal right to interpret that Constitution for themselves". The resolutions declared that Ohio had the legal power to tax the Bank.

The controversy eventually reached the Supreme Court in Osborn v. Bank of the United States, 22 U.S. (9 Wheat.) 738 (1824). The Supreme Court held that Ohio's tax on the Bank was unconstitutional. The Supreme Court stated: "[T]he act of the State of Ohio ... is repugnant to a law of the United States, made in pursuance of the Constitution, and therefore void." The Supreme Court thus rejected Ohio's attempt to nullify federal law.

=== Georgia and the Cherokees ===
In the 1820s, Georgia passed an act making Georgia state law applicable on all Cherokee lands and declaring all laws of the Cherokee nation void. This contradicted federal treaties with the Cherokees, effectively nullifying those federal treaties. Georgia's actions were reviewed by the U.S. Supreme Court in Worcester v. Georgia, 31 U.S. (6 Pet.) 515 (1832). While the case was pending in the Supreme Court, the Georgia legislature passed a resolution asserting that under the Tenth Amendment, the federal government had no jurisdiction over Georgia criminal law and the Supreme Court's review of the case was unconstitutional.

The Supreme Court rejected Georgia's attempt to nullify the federal treaties with the Cherokees. The Court held that "according to the settled principles of our Constitution", authority over Indian affairs is "committed exclusively to the government of the Union". The Court held that under the federal treaties with the Cherokees, "the laws of Georgia can have no force" on Cherokee land. The Court held that Georgia's laws regulating Cherokee land were "void, as being repugnant to the constitution, treaties, and laws of the United States". The Supreme Court thus asserted final authority to interpret the Constitution and federal treaties, rejecting Georgia's nullification attempt.

Georgia refused to accept the Supreme Court's decision. President Andrew Jackson did not believe Georgia had the right to nullify federal law, but was sympathetic to Georgia's goal of forcing the Cherokees to relocate to the west. He took no immediate action against Georgia. Before the Supreme Court could hear a request for an order enforcing its judgment, the Nullification Crisis arose in South Carolina. Jackson wanted to avoid a confrontation with Georgia over states' rights. A compromise was brokered under which Georgia repealed the law at issue in Worcester. Despite the Court's decision finding Georgia's actions unconstitutional, Georgia continued to enforce other laws regulating the Cherokees. Ultimately the Cherokees were forced to agree to a treaty of relocation, leading to the Trail of Tears.

=== The nullification crisis ===
The idea of nullification increasingly became associated with matters pertaining to the sectional conflict and slavery. The best known statement of the theory of nullification during this period, authored by John C. Calhoun, was the South Carolina Exposition and Protest of 1828. Calhoun asserted that the Tariff of 1828, which favored the northern manufacturing states and harmed the southern agricultural states, was unconstitutional. Calhoun argued that each state, as "an essential attribute of sovereignty", has the right to judge the extent of its own powers and the allocation of power between the state and the federal government. Calhoun argued that each state therefore necessarily has a "veto", or a "right of interposition", with respect to acts of the federal government that the state believes encroach on its rights.

In the Webster–Hayne debate in the Senate in 1830, Daniel Webster responded to this nullification theory by arguing that the Constitution itself provides for the resolution of disputes between the federal government and the states regarding allocation of powers. Webster argued that the Supremacy Clause provides that the Constitution and federal laws enacted pursuant thereto are superior to state law, and that Article III gives to the federal judiciary the power to resolve all issues relating to interpretation of the Constitution. Under the Constitution, the federal courts therefore have the last word, said Webster. Webster said that the Constitution does not give the states a power of constitutional interpretation, and that any such power would result in as many conflicting interpretations of the Constitution as there are states. Therefore, said Webster, under the Constitution, the states do not have the power to nullify federal laws.

In 1832, South Carolina undertook to nullify the Tariff of 1828 and the Tariff of 1832, as well as a subsequent federal act authorizing the use of force to enforce the tariffs. South Carolina purported to prohibit enforcement of these tariff acts within the state, asserting that these acts "are unauthorized by the constitution of the United States, and violate the true meaning and intent thereof and are null, void, and no law, nor binding upon this State, its officers or citizens". President Andrew Jackson denied that South Carolina had the power to nullify federal statutes, and prepared to enforce federal law forcibly if necessary. In his Proclamation to the People of South Carolina, Jackson said: "I consider, then, the power to annul a law of the United States, assumed by one State, incompatible with the existence of the Union, contradicted expressly by the letter of the Constitution, unauthorized by its spirit, inconsistent with every principle on which It was founded, and destructive of the great object for which it was formed." No other state supported South Carolina. James Madison, author of the Virginia Resolution, also weighed in at this time, stating that the Virginia Resolution should not be interpreted to mean that each state has the right to nullify federal law. The issue was made moot by an enactment of a compromise tariff bill. While the nullification crisis arose over a tariff law, it was recognized that the issues at stake had application to the slavery question as well.

=== Nullification attempts and the Fugitive Slave Laws ===
Northern states in the mid-19th century attempted to block enforcement of the pro-slavery federal Fugitive Slave Acts of 1793 and 1850. Several northern states passed personal liberty laws that had the practical effect of undermining the effectiveness of the federal fugitive slave statutes and preventing slave owners from recovering runaways. For example, a Pennsylvania law enacted in 1826 made it a crime for any person to forcibly remove a black person from the state with the intention of keeping or selling him as a slave.

The U.S. Supreme Court upheld the validity of the federal Fugitive Slave Act of 1793 in the case of Prigg v. Pennsylvania, 41 U.S. 539 (1842). The Court rejected Pennsylvania's argument that Congress had no constitutional authority to enact the Fugitive Slave Act, finding that the Act was authorized by the Constitution's fugitive slave clause (Article IV, Section 2). The Court found that Pennsylvania's personal liberty law was unconstitutional because it conflicted with the Constitution's fugitive slave clause. The Court thus rejected Pennsylvania's attempt to nullify the Fugitive Slave Act. However, the Supreme Court implied that states might be able to pass laws denying the assistance of state officials in enforcement of the Fugitive Slave Act, leaving enforcement to federal officials.

The Supreme Court again dealt with a northern challenge to the federal fugitive slave statutes in the case of Ableman v. Booth, 62 U.S. 506 (1859). The courts of Wisconsin held the Fugitive Slave Act of 1850 unconstitutional and ordered the release of a prisoner who was prosecuted in federal district court for violation of the Act. The Wisconsin court declared that the Supreme Court had no authority to review its decision. The Wisconsin legislature passed a resolution declaring that the Supreme Court had no jurisdiction over the Wisconsin court's decision. In language borrowed from the Kentucky Resolution of 1798, the Wisconsin resolution asserted that the Supreme Court's review of the case was void.

The Supreme Court held that Wisconsin did not have the power to nullify federal law or to prevent federal officials from enforcing the Fugitive Slave Act. The Court held that in adopting the Supremacy Clause, the people of the United States had made federal law superior to state law and had provided that in the event of a conflict, federal law would control. Further, the Court found that the people had delegated the judicial power, including final appellate authority, to the federal courts with respect to cases arising under the Constitution and laws of the United States. Therefore, the people gave the federal courts final authority to determine the constitutionality of federal statutes and to determine the boundary between federal power and state power. Accordingly, the Court held that the Wisconsin court did not have the power to nullify a federal statute that had been upheld by the federal courts or to interfere with federal enforcement of that statute.

Ableman v. Booth was the Supreme Court's most thorough examination yet of the theory of nullification. Like the decisions that preceded it, Ableman found that federal law was superior to state law, and that under the Constitution, the final power to determine the constitutionality of federal laws lies in the federal courts, not the states. Ableman found that the Constitution gave the Supreme Court final authority to determine the extent and limits of federal power and that the states therefore do not have the power to nullify federal law.

The Civil War put an end to most nullification attempts. Nullification relied on principles of states' rights that were viewed as no longer viable after the Civil War.

== Nullification attempts and school desegregation in the 1950s ==
Nullification and interposition resurfaced in the 1950s as southern states attempted to preserve racial segregation in their schools. In Brown v. Board of Education, 347 U.S. 483 (1954), the Supreme Court decided that segregated schools were unconstitutional. At least ten southern states passed nullification or interposition measures attempting to preserve segregated schools and refusing to follow the Brown decision. The advocates of these nullification and interposition measures argued that the Brown decision was an unconstitutional infringement on states' rights, and that the states had the power to prevent that decision from being enforced within their borders.

The Supreme Court explicitly rejected nullification in the case of Cooper v. Aaron, 358 U.S. 1 (1958). The state of Arkansas had passed several laws in an effort to prevent the integration of its schools. The Supreme Court held that state governments had no power to nullify the Brown decision and its implementation "can neither be nullified openly and directly by state legislators or state executive or judicial officers nor nullified indirectly by them through evasive schemes for segregation whether attempted 'ingeniously or ingenuously'." Thus, Cooper v. Aaron directly held that states may not nullify federal law.

The Supreme Court rejected interposition in a similar context. The Supreme Court affirmed the decision of a federal district court that rejected Louisiana's attempt to use interposition to protect its segregated schools. The district court found that interposition by the states is inconsistent with the Constitution, which gives the power to decide constitutional issues to the Supreme Court, not the states. The court held: "The conclusion is clear that interposition is not a constitutional doctrine. If taken seriously, it is illegal defiance of constitutional authority. Otherwise, 'it amounted to no more than a protest, an escape valve through which the legislators blew off steam to relieve their tensions.' ... However solemn or spirited, interposition resolutions have no legal efficacy." Bush v. Orleans Parish School Board, 188 F. Supp. 916 (E.D. La. 1960), aff'd 364 U.S. 500 (1960). The Supreme Court affirmed this decision, thus holding that interposition cannot be used to negate federal law.

== Nullification vs. interposition ==
In theory, nullification differs from interposition in several respects. Nullification is usually considered to be an act by a state finding a federal law unconstitutional, and declaring it void and unenforceable in that state. A nullification act often makes it illegal to enforce the federal law in question. Nullification arguably may be undertaken by a single state.

Interposition also involves a declaration that a federal law is unconstitutional. There are various actions that a state might take to "interpose" once it has determined that a federal law is unconstitutional. In the Virginia Resolutions of 1798, Madison did not describe the form or effect of interposition. But two years later in the Report of 1800, Madison described a variety of actions that states might take to "interpose": communicating with other states about the unconstitutional federal law, attempting to enlist the support of other states, petitioning Congress to repeal the law, introducing Constitutional amendments in Congress, or calling a constitutional convention. Madison did not argue that a state could "interpose" by legally nullifying a federal law and declaring it unenforceable. Madison contemplated that interposition would be a joint action by a number of states, not an action by a single state. Interposition is considered to be less extreme than nullification because it does not involve a state's unilateral decision to prevent enforcement of federal law.

In practice, nullification and interposition often have been confused, and sometimes have been used indistinguishably. John C. Calhoun indicated that these terms were interchangeable, stating: "This right of interposition, thus solemnly asserted by the State of Virginia, be it called what it may – State-right, veto, nullification, or by any other name – I conceive to be the fundamental principle of our system." During the fight over integration of the schools in the south in the 1950s, a number of southern states passed so-called "Acts of Interposition" that actually would have had the effect of nullification.

As noted above, the courts have rejected both nullification and interposition.

== Nullification compared to other actions by the states ==
States sometimes have taken various actions short of nullification in an effort to prevent enforcement of federal law. While nullification is an attempt to declare federal law unconstitutional and to forbid its enforcement within the state, some other actions by the states do not attempt to declare federal law invalid, but instead use other means in an effort to prevent or hinder enforcement of federal law.

=== State lawsuits challenging federal law ===
Nullification should be distinguished from the situation in which a state brings a lawsuit to challenge the constitutionality of a federal law. A state may challenge the constitutionality of a federal statute by filing a lawsuit in court seeking to declare the federal law unconstitutional. Such a lawsuit is decided by the courts, with the Supreme Court having final jurisdiction. This is the accepted method of challenging the constitutionality of a federal statute. This is not nullification, even if the courts uphold the state's position and declare the federal statute unconstitutional. The theory of nullification is that the states have the unilateral power to determine the constitutionality of federal laws, and that a state's determination of unconstitutionality cannot be reviewed or reversed by the courts. Thus, nullification involves a declaration by a state that a federal statute is unconstitutional and cannot be enforced within the state. Under the theory of nullification, such a declaration by a state is final and binding, and cannot be overruled by the courts. On the other hand, when a state files a lawsuit in court challenging the constitutionality of a federal statute, the decision on constitutionality is made by the courts and ultimately can be decided by the Supreme Court, not by the state legislature or state courts. Because such a lawsuit recognizes the authority of the Supreme Court to make the ultimate decision on constitutionality, it is not a use of nullification.

=== State refusals to assist in enforcement of federal law ===
As noted above, the Supreme Court indicated in Prigg v. Pennsylvania, 41 U.S. 539 (1842), that the states cannot be compelled to use state law enforcement resources to enforce federal law. The Supreme Court reaffirmed this principle in cases such as Printz v. United States, 521 U.S. 898 (1997) and New York v. United States, 505 U.S. 144 (1992), which held that the federal government may not enact a regulatory program that "commandeers" the state's legislative and administrative mechanisms to enforce federal law. States therefore may refuse to use their legislative or administrative resources to enforce federal law. This should be distinguished from nullification. States that withhold their enforcement assistance, but do not declare the federal law unconstitutional or forbid its enforcement by the federal government, are not declaring federal law invalid and therefore are not engaging in nullification. As Prigg held, the federal law still is valid and federal authorities may enforce it within the state. The states in this situation, rather than attempting to legally nullify federal law, are attempting to make enforcement of federal law more difficult by refusing to make available their legislative and administrative resources.

=== State legalization of acts prohibited by federal law ===
Some states have legalized acts that are prohibited by federal law. For example, several states have legalized recreational marijuana use under state law. An act's legality under state law does not affect its legality under federal law. An act may be legal under state law and, at the same time, illegal under federal law. The states that have legalized marijuana use have not attempted to declare that federal marijuana laws are invalid or unenforceable. However, the validity of federal marijuana laws remain in question with the absence of a constitutional amendment to justify federal marijuana prohibition. Even so, these states have not explicitly attempted to nullify federal law.

However, for practical purposes, the federal government lacks the resources to enforce its marijuana laws on a large scale and so the legalization of marijuana under state law significantly reduces the ability of the federal government to enforce the marijuana laws. Both that and the US Attorney General's statement that the federal government will not intervene if following certain guidelines laid down by the attorney general make marijuana de facto and de jure legal at the state level and de facto legal but de jure illegal on the federal level.

== See also ==
- McCulloch v. Maryland
- Montana Firearms Freedom Act
- States' rights
- Tenth Amendment
- Tenther movement

== Bibliography ==
- Ableman v. Booth, 62 U.S. 506 (1859)
- Anderson, Frank Maloy (1899). "Contemporary Opinion of the Virginia and Kentucky Resolutions" . The American Historical Review: 45–63, 225–244.
- Bush v. Orleans Parish School Board, 188 F. Supp. 916 (E.D. La. 1960)
- Cooper v. Aaron, 358 U.S. 1 (1958)
- Elliot, Jonathan (1907) [1836]. Debates in the Several State Conventions on the Adoption of the Federal Constitution . Vol. 4 (expanded 2nd ed.). Philadelphia: Lippincott. pp. 532–539.
- Freehling, William W. (1992). Prelude to Civil War: The Nullification Controversy in South Carolina, 1816-1836. Oxford University Press. ISBN 978-0-19-507681-3.
- Kentucky Resolutions of 1798.
- Kentucky Resolutions of 1799.
- Madison, James. "Notes, On Nullification", Library of Congress, December 1834.
- Virginia Report of 1800
- Virginia Resolutions of 1798.
- Wood, Walter (2008). Nullification: A Constitutional History, 1776–1833. Washington, DC: University Press of America. ISBN 978-0-7618-4011-4.
- Woods, Thomas E. (2010). Nullification: How to Resist Federal Tyranny in the 21st Century. Washington, DC: Regnery. ISBN 978-1-59698-149-2.
