= Kentucky and Virginia Resolutions =

1798/99 resolutions against the Alien and Sedition Acts

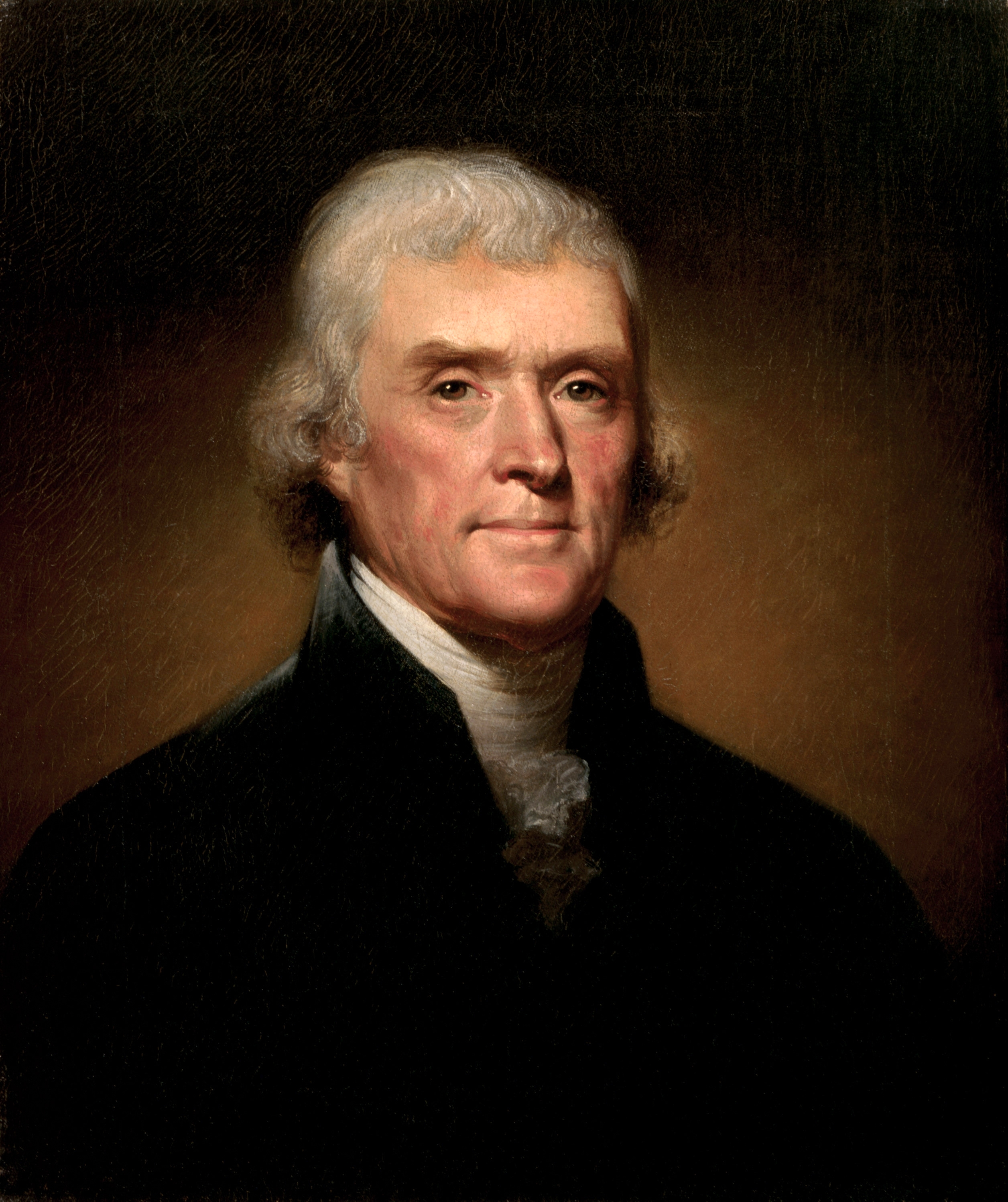
Thomas Jefferson

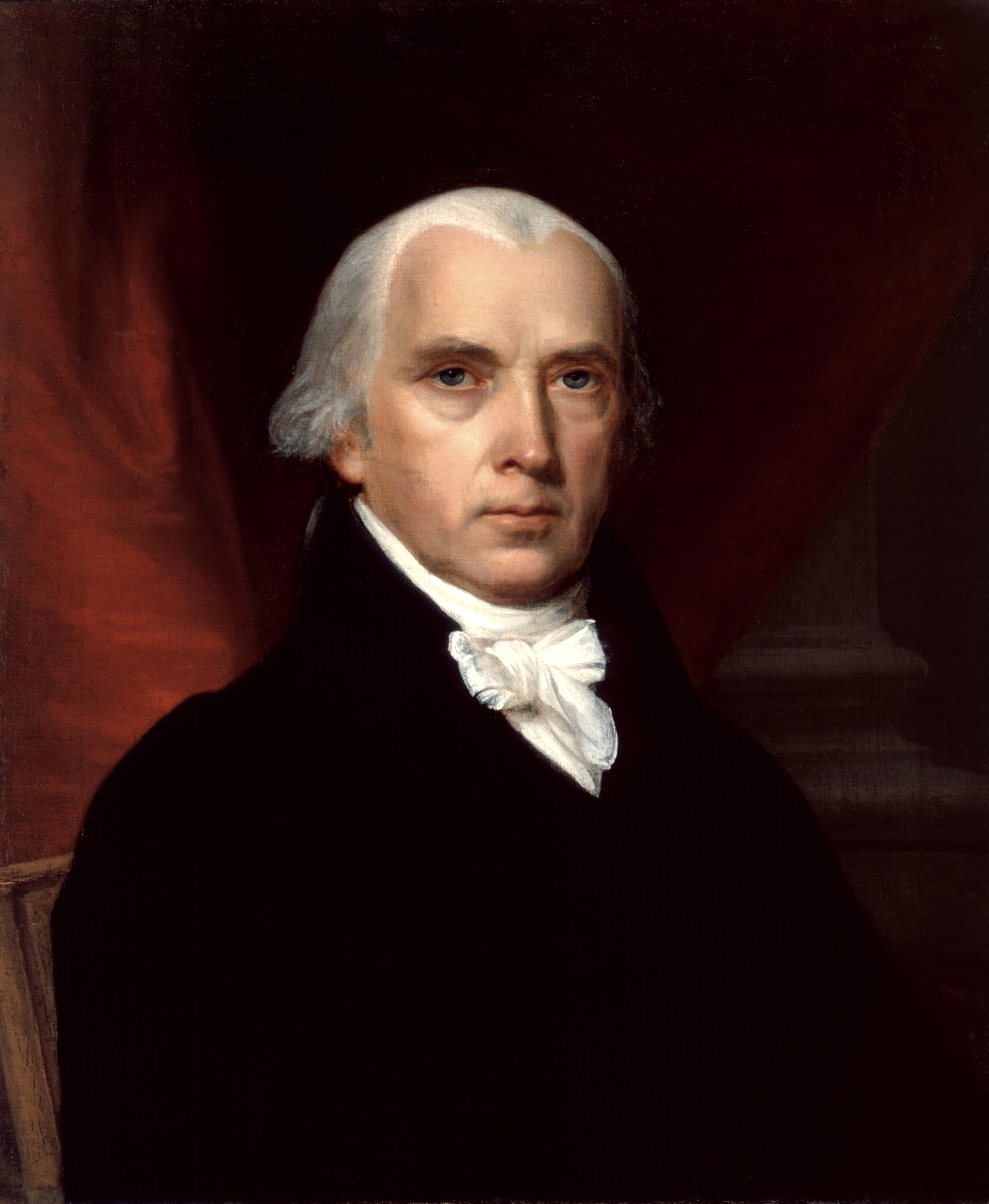
James Madison

The Kentucky and Virginia Resolutions were political statements drafted in 1798 and 1799 in which the Kentucky and Virginia legislatures took the position that the federal Alien and Sedition Acts were unconstitutional. The resolutions argued that the states had the right and the duty to declare unconstitutional those acts of Congress that the Constitution did not authorize. In doing so, they argued for states' rights and strict construction of the Constitution. The Kentucky and Virginia Resolutions of 1798 were written secretly by Vice President Thomas Jefferson and James Madison, respectively.

The principles stated in the resolutions became known as the "Principles of '98". Adherents argued that the states could judge the constitutionality of federal government laws and decrees. The Kentucky Resolutions of 1798 argued that each individual state has the power to declare that federal laws are unconstitutional and void. The Kentucky Resolution of 1799 added that when the states determine that a law is unconstitutional, nullification by the states is the proper remedy. The Virginia Resolutions of 1798 refer to "interposition" to express the idea that the states have a right to "interpose" to prevent harm caused by unconstitutional laws. The Virginia Resolutions contemplated joint action by the states.

The Resolutions were produced primarily as campaign material for the 1800 United States presidential election and had been controversial since their passage, eliciting disapproval from ten state legislatures. Ron Chernow assessed the theoretical damage of the resolutions as "deep and lasting ... a recipe for disunion". George Washington was so appalled by them that he told Patrick Henry that if "systematically and pertinaciously pursued", they would "dissolve the union or produce coercion". Their influence reverberated right up to the Civil War and beyond. In the years leading up to the Nullification Crisis, the resolutions divided Jeffersonian democrats, with states' rights proponents such as John C. Calhoun supporting the Principles of '98 and President Andrew Jackson opposing them. Years later, the passage of the Fugitive Slave Act of 1850 led anti-slavery activists to quote the Resolutions to support their calls on Northern states to nullify what they considered unconstitutional enforcement of the law.

== Provisions of the Resolutions ==
The resolutions opposed the federal Alien and Sedition Acts, which extended the powers of the federal government. They argued that the Constitution was a "compact" or agreement among the states. Therefore, the federal government had no right to exercise powers not specifically delegated to it. If the federal government assumed such powers, its acts could be declared unconstitutional by the states. So, states could decide the constitutionality of laws passed by Congress. Kentucky's Resolution 1 stated:

That the several states composing the United States of America are not united on the principle of unlimited submission to their general government; but that, by compact, under the style and title of a Constitution for the United States, and of amendments thereto, they constituted a general government for special purposes, delegated to that government certain definite powers, reserving, each state to itself, the residuary mass of right to their own self-government; and that whensoever the general government assumes undelegated powers, its acts are unauthoritative, void, and of no force; that to this compact each state acceded as a state, and is an integral party, its co-States forming, as to itself, the other party; that this government, created by this compact, was not made the exclusive or final judge of the extent of the powers delegated to itself, since that would have made its discretion, and not the Constitution, the measure of its powers; but that, as in all other cases of compact among powers having no common judge, each party has an equal right to judge for itself, as well of infractions as of the mode and measure of redress.

A key provision of the Kentucky Resolutions was Resolution 2, which denied Congress more than a few penal powers by arguing that Congress had no authority to punish crimes other than those specifically named in the Constitution. The Alien and Sedition Acts were asserted to be unconstitutional, and therefore void, because they dealt with crimes not mentioned in the Constitution:

That the Constitution of the United States, having delegated to Congress a power to punish treason, counterfeiting the securities and current coin of the United States, piracies, and felonies committed on the high seas, and offenses against the law of nations, and no other crimes, whatsoever; and it being true as a general principle, and one of the amendments to the Constitution having also declared, that "the powers not delegated to the United States by the Constitution, nor prohibited by it to the States, are reserved to the States respectively, or to the people," therefore the act of Congress, passed on the 14th day of July, 1798, and intitled "An Act in addition to the act intitled An Act for the punishment of certain crimes against the United States," as also the act passed by them on the—day of June, 1798, intitled "An Act to punish frauds committed on the bank of the United States," (and all their other acts which assume to create, define, or punish crimes, other than those so enumerated in the Constitution,) are altogether void, and of no force whatsoever.

The Virginia Resolution of 1798 also relied on the compact theory and asserted that the states have the right to determine whether actions of the federal government exceed constitutional limits. The Virginia Resolution introduced the idea that the states may "interpose" when the federal government acts unconstitutionally, in their opinion:

That this Assembly doth explicitly and peremptorily declare, that it views the powers of the federal government as resulting from the compact to which the states are parties, as limited by the plain sense and intention of the instrument constituting that compact, as no further valid than they are authorized by the grants enumerated in that compact; and that, in case of a deliberate, palpable, and dangerous exercise of other powers, not granted by the said compact, the states, who are parties thereto, have the right, and are in duty bound, to interpose, for arresting the progress of the evil, and for maintaining, within their respective limits, the authorities, rights and liberties, appertaining to them.

== History of the Resolutions ==
There were two sets of Kentucky Resolutions. The Kentucky General Assembly passed the first resolution on November 16, 1798, and the second on December 3, 1799. Jefferson wrote the 1798 Resolutions. The author of the 1799 Resolutions is not known with certainty. Both resolutions were stewarded by John Breckinridge who was falsely believed to have been their author.

James Madison wrote the Virginia Resolution. The Virginia General Assembly passed it on December 24, 1798.

The Kentucky Resolutions of 1798 stated that acts of the national government beyond the scope of its constitutional powers are "unauthoritative, void, and of no force". While Jefferson's draft of the 1798 Resolutions had claimed that each state has a right of "nullification" of unconstitutional laws, that language did not appear in the final form of those Resolutions. Rather than purporting to nullify the Alien and Sedition Acts, the 1798 Resolutions called on the other states to join Kentucky "in declaring these acts void and of no force" and "in requesting their repeal at the next session of Congress".

The Kentucky Resolutions of 1799 were written to respond to the states who had rejected the 1798 Resolutions. The 1799 Resolutions used the term "nullification", which had been deleted from Jefferson's draft of the 1798 Resolutions, resolving: "That the several states who formed [the Constitution], being sovereign and independent, have the unquestionable right to judge of its infraction; and, That a nullification, by those sovereignties, of all unauthorized acts done under color of that instrument, is the rightful remedy." The 1799 Resolutions did not assert that Kentucky would unilaterally refuse to enforce the Alien and Sedition Acts. Rather, the 1799 Resolutions declared that Kentucky "will bow to the laws of the Union" but would continue "to oppose in a constitutional manner" the Alien and Sedition Acts. The 1799 Resolutions concluded by stating that Kentucky was entering its "solemn protest" against those Acts.

The Virginia Resolution did not refer to "nullification", but instead used the idea of "interposition" by the states. The Resolution stated that when the national government acts beyond the scope of the Constitution, the states "have the right, and are in duty bound, to interpose, for arresting the progress of the evil, and for maintaining, within their respective limits, the authorities, rights and liberties, appertaining to them". The Virginia Resolution did not indicate what form this "interposition" might take or what effect it would have. The Virginia Resolutions appealed to the other states for agreement and cooperation.

Numerous scholars (including Koch and Ammon) have noted that Madison had the words "void, and of no force or effect" excised from the Virginia Resolutions before adoption. Madison later explained that he did this because an individual state does not have the right to declare a federal law null and void. Rather, Madison explained that "interposition" involved a collective action of the states, not a refusal by an individual state to enforce federal law, and that the deletion of the words "void, and of no force or effect" was intended to make clear that no individual state could nullify federal law.

The Kentucky Resolutions of 1799, while claiming the right of nullification, did not assert that individual states could exercise that right. Rather, nullification was described as an action to be taken by "the several states" who formed the Constitution. The Kentucky Resolutions thus ended up proposing joint action, as did the Virginia Resolution.

The Resolutions joined the foundational beliefs of Jefferson's party and were used as party documents in the 1800 election. As they had been shepherded to passage in the Virginia House of Delegates by John Taylor of Caroline, they became part of the heritage of the "Old Republicans". Taylor rejoiced in what the House of Delegates had made of Madison's draft: it had read the claim that the Alien and Sedition Acts were unconstitutional as meaning that they had "no force or effect" in Virginia—that is, that they were void. Future Virginia Governor and U.S. Secretary of War James Barbour concluded that "unconstitutional" included "void, and of no force or effect", and that Madison's textual change did not affect the meaning. Madison himself strongly denied this reading of the Resolution.

The long-term importance of the Resolutions lies not in their attack on the Alien and Sedition Acts, but rather in their strong statements of states' rights theory, which led to the rather different concepts of nullification and interposition.

=== Responses of other states ===
The resolutions were submitted to the other states for approval, but with no success. Seven states formally responded to Kentucky and Virginia by rejecting the Resolutions and three other states passed resolutions expressing disapproval, with the other four states taking no action. No other state affirmed the resolutions. At least six states responded to the Resolutions by taking the position that the constitutionality of acts of Congress is a question for the federal courts, not the state legislatures. For example, Vermont's resolution stated: "It belongs not to state legislatures to decide on the constitutionality of laws made by the general government; this power being exclusively vested in the judiciary courts of the Union." In New Hampshire, newspapers treated them as military threats and replied with foreshadowings of civil war. "We think it highly probable that Virginia and Kentucky will be sadly disappointed in their infernal plan of exciting insurrections and tumults," proclaimed one. The state legislature's unanimous reply was blunt:

Resolved, That the legislature of New Hampshire unequivocally express a firm resolution to maintain and defend the Constitution of the United States, and the Constitution of this state, against every aggression, either foreign or domestic, and that they will support the government of the United States in all measures warranted by the former. That the state legislatures are not the proper tribunals to determine the constitutionality of the laws of the general government; that the duty of such decision is properly and exclusively confided to the judicial department.

Alexander Hamilton, then building up the army, suggested sending it into Virginia, on some "obvious pretext". Measures would be taken, Hamilton hinted to an ally in Congress, "to act upon the laws and put Virginia to the Test of resistance". At the Virginia General Assembly, delegate John Mathews was said to have objected to the passing of the resolutions by "tearing them into pieces and trampling them underfoot."

=== The Report of 1800 ===
In January 1800, the Virginia General Assembly passed the Report of 1800, a document written by Madison to respond to criticism of the Virginia Resolution by other states. The Report of 1800 reviewed and affirmed each part of the Virginia Resolution, affirming that the states have the right to declare that a federal action is unconstitutional. The Report went on to assert that a declaration of unconstitutionality by a state would be an expression of opinion, without legal effect. The purpose of such a declaration, said Madison, was to mobilize public opinion and to elicit cooperation from other states. Madison indicated that the power to make binding constitutional determinations remained in the federal courts:

It has been said, that it belongs to the judiciary of the United States, and not the state legislatures, to declare the meaning of the Federal Constitution. ... [T]he declarations of [the citizens or the state legislature], whether affirming or denying the constitutionality of measures of the Federal Government ... are expressions of opinion, unaccompanied with any other effect than what they may produce on opinion, by exciting reflection. The expositions of the judiciary, on the other hand, are carried into immediate effect by force. The former may lead to a change in the legislative expression of the general will; possibly to a change in the opinion of the judiciary; the latter enforces the general will, whilst that will and that opinion continue unchanged.

Madison then argued that a state, after declaring a federal law unconstitutional, could take action by communicating with other states, attempting to enlist their support, petitioning Congress to repeal the law in question, introducing amendments to the Constitution in Congress, or calling a constitutional convention.

However, in the same document Madison explicitly argued that the states retain the ultimate power to decide about the constitutionality of the federal laws, in "extreme cases" such as the Alien and Sedition Act. The Supreme Court can decide in the last resort only in those cases which pertain to the acts of other branches of the federal government, but cannot takeover the ultimate decision-making power from the states which are the "sovereign parties" in the Constitutional compact. According to Madison states could override not only the Congressional acts, but also the decisions of the Supreme Court:

The resolution supposes that dangerous powers, not delegated, may not only be usurped and executed by the other departments, but that the judicial department, also, may exercise or sanction dangerous powers beyond the grant of the Constitution; and, consequently, that the ultimate right of the parties to the Constitution, to judge whether the compact has been dangerously violated, must extend to violations by one delegated authority as well as by another—by the judiciary as well as by the executive, or the legislature.

However true, therefore, it may be, that the judicial department is, in all questions submitted to it by the forms of the Constitution, to decide in the last resort, this resort must necessarily be deemed the last in relation to the authorities of the other departments of the government; not in relation to the rights of the parties to the constitutional compact, from which the judicial, as well as the other departments, hold their delegated trusts. On any other hypothesis, the delegation of judicial power would annul the authority delegating it; and the concurrence of this department with the others in usurped powers, might subvert forever, and beyond the possible reach of any rightful remedy, the very Constitution which all were instituted to preserve.

Madison later strongly denied that individual states have the right to nullify federal law.

== Influence of the Resolutions ==
Although the New England states rejected the Kentucky and Virginia Resolutions in 1798–99, several years later, the state governments of Massachusetts, Connecticut, and Rhode Island threatened to ignore the Embargo Act of 1807 based on the authority of states to stand up to laws deemed by those states to be unconstitutional. Rhode Island justified its position on the embargo act based on the explicit language of interposition. However, none of these states actually passed a resolution nullifying the Embargo Act. Instead, they challenged it in court, appealed to Congress for its repeal, and proposed several constitutional amendments.

Several years later, Massachusetts and Connecticut asserted their right to test constitutionality when instructed to send their militias to defend the coast during the War of 1812. Connecticut and Massachusetts questioned another embargo passed in 1813. Both states objected, including this statement from the Massachusetts legislature, or General Court:

A power to regulate commerce is abused, when employed to destroy it; and a manifest and voluntary abuse of power sanctions the right of resistance, as much as a direct and palpable usurpation. The sovereignty reserved to the states, was reserved to protect the citizens from acts of violence by the United States, as well as for purposes of domestic regulation. We spurn the idea that the free, sovereign and independent State of Massachusetts is reduced to a mere municipal corporation, without power to protect its people, and to defend them from oppression, from whatever quarter it comes. Whenever the national compact is violated, and the citizens of this State are oppressed by cruel and unauthorized laws, this Legislature is bound to interpose its power, and wrest from the oppressor its victim.

Massachusetts and Connecticut, along with representatives of some other New England states, held a convention in 1814 that issued a statement asserting the right of interposition. But the statement did not attempt to nullify federal law. Rather, it made an appeal to Congress to provide for the defense of New England and proposed several constitutional amendments.

=== The Nullification Crisis ===
During the "nullification crisis" of 1828–1833, South Carolina passed an Ordinance of Nullification purporting to nullify two federal tariff laws. South Carolina asserted that the Tariff of 1828 and the Tariff of 1832 were beyond the authority of the Constitution, and therefore were "null, void, and no law, nor binding upon this State, its officers or citizens". Andrew Jackson issued a proclamation against the doctrine of nullification, stating: "I consider ... the power to annul a law of the United States, assumed by one State, incompatible with the existence of the Union, contradicted expressly by the letter of the Constitution, unauthorized by its spirit, inconsistent with every principle on which it was founded, and destructive of the great object for which it was formed." He also denied the right to secede: "The Constitution ... forms a government not a league. ... To say that any State may at pleasure secede from the Union is to say that the United States is not a nation."

James Madison also opposed South Carolina's position on nullification. Madison argued that he had never intended his Virginia Resolution to suggest that each individual state had the power to nullify an act of Congress. Madison wrote: "But it follows, from no view of the subject, that a nullification of a law of the U. S. can as is now contended, belong rightfully to a single State, as one of the parties to the Constitution; the State not ceasing to avow its adherence to the Constitution. A plainer contradiction in terms, or a more fatal inlet to anarchy, cannot be imagined." Madison explained that when the Virginia Legislature passed the Virginia Resolution, the "interposition" it contemplated was "a concurring and cooperating interposition of the States, not that of a single State. ... [T]he Legislature expressly disclaimed the idea that a declaration of a State, that a law of the U. S. was unconstitutional, had the effect of annulling the law." Madison went on to argue that the purpose of the Virginia Resolution had been to elicit cooperation by the other states in seeking change through means provided in the Constitution, such as an amendment.

=== The compact theory ===
The Supreme Court rejected the compact theory in several nineteenth century cases, undermining the basis for the Kentucky and Virginia resolutions. In cases such as Martin v. Hunter's Lessee, McCulloch v. Maryland, and Texas v. White, the Court asserted that the Constitution was established directly by the people, rather than being a compact among the states. Abraham Lincoln also rejected the compact theory saying the Constitution was a binding contract among the states and no contract can be changed unilaterally by one party.

=== School desegregation ===
In 1954, the Supreme Court decided Brown v. Board of Education, which ruled that segregated schools violate the Constitution. Many people in southern states strongly opposed the Brown decision. James J. Kilpatrick, an editor of the Richmond News Leader, wrote a series of editorials urging "massive resistance" to integration of the schools. Kilpatrick, relying on the Virginia Resolution, revived the idea of interposition by the states as a constitutional basis for resisting federal government action. A number of southern states, including Arkansas, Louisiana, Virginia, and Florida, subsequently passed interposition and nullification laws in an effort to prevent integration of their schools.

In the case of Cooper v. Aaron, the Supreme Court unanimously rejected Arkansas' effort to use nullification and interposition. The Supreme Court held that under the Supremacy Clause, federal law was controlling and the states did not have the power to evade the application of federal law. The Court specifically rejected the contention that Arkansas' legislature and governor had the power to nullify the Brown decision.

In a similar case arising from Louisiana's interposition act, Bush v. Orleans Parish School Board, the Supreme Court affirmed the decision of a federal district court that rejected interposition. The district court stated: "The conclusion is clear that interposition is not a constitutional doctrine. If taken seriously, it is illegal defiance of constitutional authority. Otherwise, 'it amounted to no more than a protest, an escape valve through which the legislators blew off steam to relieve their tensions.' ... However solemn or spirited, interposition resolutions have no legal efficacy."

== Importance of the Resolutions ==
Merrill Peterson, Jefferson's otherwise very favorable biographer, emphasizes the negative long-term impact of the Resolutions, calling them "dangerous" and a product of "hysteria":

Called forth by oppressive legislation of the national government, notably the Alien and Sedition Laws, they represented a vigorous defense of the principles of freedom and self-government under the United States Constitution. But since the defense involved an appeal to principles of state rights, the resolutions struck a line of argument potentially as dangerous to the Union as were the odious laws to the freedom with which it was identified. One hysteria tended to produce another. A crisis of freedom threatened to become a crisis of Union. The latter was deferred in 1798–1800, but it would return, and when it did the principles Jefferson had invoked against the Alien and Sedition Laws would sustain delusions of state sovereignty fully as violent as the Federalist delusions he had combated.

Jefferson's biographer Dumas Malone argued that the Kentucky resolution might have gotten Jefferson impeached for treason, had his actions become known at the time. In writing the Kentucky Resolutions, Jefferson warned that, "unless arrested at the threshold", the Alien and Sedition Acts would "necessarily drive these states into revolution and blood." Historian Ron Chernow says of this "he wasn't calling for peaceful protests or civil disobedience: he was calling for outright rebellion, if needed, against the federal government of which he was vice president." Jefferson "thus set forth a radical doctrine of states' rights that effectively undermined the constitution." Chernow argues that neither Jefferson nor Madison sensed that they had sponsored measures as inimical as the Alien and Sedition Acts themselves. Historian Garry Wills argued "Their nullification effort, if others had picked it up, would have been a greater threat to freedom than the misguided [alien and sedition] laws, which were soon rendered feckless by ridicule and electoral pressure". The theoretical damage of the Kentucky and Virginia resolutions was "deep and lasting, and was a recipe for disunion". George Washington was so appalled by them that he told Patrick Henry that if "systematically and pertinaciously pursued", they would "dissolve the union or produce coercion". The influence of Jefferson's doctrine of states' rights reverberated right up to the Civil War and beyond. Future president James Garfield, at the close of the Civil War, said that Jefferson's Kentucky Resolution "contained the germ of nullification and secession, and we are today reaping the fruits".
