= South Carolina Exposition and Protest =

1828 document written by John C. Calhoun

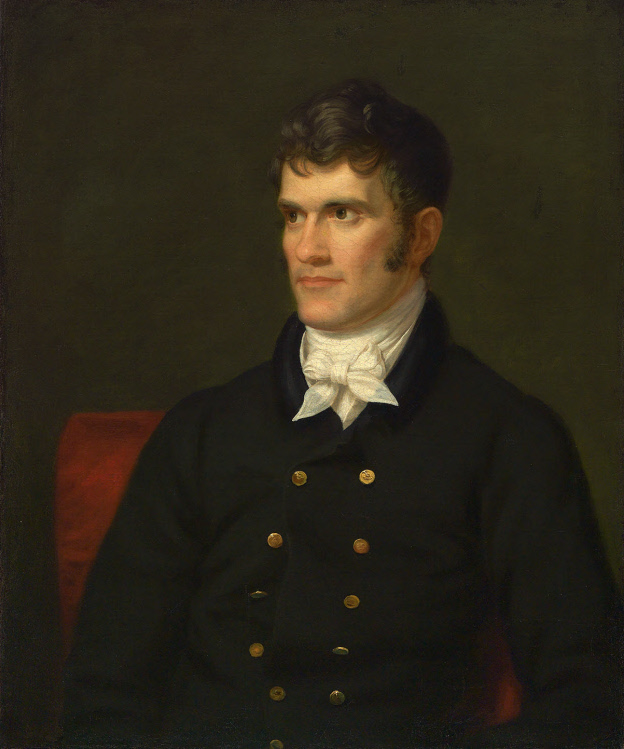
1822 portrait of John C. Calhoun

The South Carolina Exposition and Protest, also known as Calhoun's Exposition, was written in December 1828 by John C. Calhoun, then Vice President of the United States under John Quincy Adams and later under Andrew Jackson. Calhoun did not formally state his authorship at the time, though it was widely suspected and later confirmed.

The document was a protest against the Tariff of 1828, also known as the Tariff of Abominations. It stated also Calhoun's Doctrine of nullification, i.e., the idea that a state has the right to reject federal law, first introduced by Thomas Jefferson and James Madison in their Kentucky and Virginia Resolutions.

== Background ==
After the final vote on the Tariff of 1828, the South Carolina congressional delegation held two caucuses, the second at the home of Senator Robert Y. Hayne. They were rebuffed in their efforts to coordinate a united Southern response and focused on how their state, by itself, would react. While many agreed with George McDuffie that tariff policy could lead to secession at some future date, they all agreed that as much as possible the issue should be kept out of the upcoming presidential election. John C. Calhoun, while not at this meeting, served as a moderating influence. He did not feel that the first step in reducing the tariff was to defeat Adams and his supporters in the upcoming election.

William C. Preston, on behalf of the South Carolina General Assembly asked Calhoun to prepare a report on the present situation of the tariff. Calhoun readily accepted the challenge and in a few weeks time had a 35,000 word draft of what would become his "Exposition and Protest."

Fearful that "hotheads" such as McDuffie might force the legislature into taking some drastic action against the federal government, Calhoun aimed for a more measured process:

All through that hot and humid summer, emotions among the vociferous planter population had been worked up to a near-frenzy of excitement. The whole tenor of the argument built up in the "Exposition" was aimed to present the case in a cool, considered manner that would dampen any drastic moves yet would set in motion the machinery for repeal of the tariff act. It would also warn other sections of the Union against any future legislation that an increasingly self-conscious South might consider punitive, especially on the subject of slavery.

== Document ==
Calhoun's "Exposition" was completed late in 1828. In it, Calhoun argued that the tariff of 1828 was unconstitutional because it favored manufacturing over commerce and agriculture. The tariff power, he felt, could be used to generate revenue but not to provide protection from foreign competition for American industries. He believed that the people of a state or several states, acting in a democratically elected convention, had the retained power to veto any act of the federal government that violated the Constitution. The veto, the core of the doctrine of nullification, was explained:

If it be conceded, as it must be by every one who is the least conversant with our institutions, that the sovereign powers delegated are divided between the General and State Governments, and that the latter hold their portion by the same tenure as the former, it would seem impossible to deny to the States the right of deciding on the infractions of their powers, and the proper remedy to be applied for their correction. The right of judging, in such cases, is an essential attribute of sovereignty, of which the States cannot be divested without losing their sovereignty itself, and being reduced to a subordinate corporate condition. In fact, to divide power, and to give to one of the parties the exclusive right of judging of the portion allotted to each, is, in reality, not to divide it at all; and to reserve such exclusive right to the General Government (it matters not by what department) to be exercised, is to convert it, in fact, into a great consolidated government, with unlimited powers, and to divest the States, in reality, of all their rights, it is impossible to understand the force of terms, and to deny so plain a conclusion.

The report also detailed the specific southern grievances over the tariff that led to the current dissatisfaction."

== Impact ==
On December 19, 1828, the report was presented to the South Carolina House of Representatives, which had five thousand copies of it printed and distributed. The presidential election had occurred, and John Quincy Adams had been defeated by Andrew Jackson. Calhoun, who still had designs on succeeding Jackson as president, was not identified as the author but word soon leaked out. The legislature took no action on the report at that time.

In 1832, as vice president under Jackson, Calhoun went public with his ideas during the nullification crisis. Both that and the political fallout from the Petticoat affair ended friendly relations between Calhoun and Jackson. As a result, Calhoun was replaced as Jackson's running mate in the 1832 election by Martin Van Buren. Calhoun resigned the vice presidency in December 1832 to take a seat in the U.S. Senate, where he continued to speak in opposition to the 1828 tariff.
