= A Short History of the Confederate States of America =

1890 book by Jefferson Davis

- Title page for A Short History of the Confederate States of America (1890)
- Author: Jefferson Davis
- Genre: History
- Publisher: Belford Company
- Publication date: 1890
- Pages: 505

A Short History of the Confederate States of America is an 1890 book by Jefferson Davis, who served as president of the Confederate States of America during the American Civil War. Davis completed the manuscript in October 1889 and died on December 6 of that year. Belford Company published the book posthumously in New York in 1890.

The book followed Davis's two-volume The Rise and Fall of the Confederate Government, published in 1881. The book formed part of Davis's broader postwar defense of the Confederacy and has been interpreted within the context of his association with the Lost Cause.

== Background and publication ==
Davis lived at Beauvoir, on the Mississippi Gulf Coast near Biloxi, Mississippi, during the final twelve years of his life. He wrote both The Rise and Fall of the Confederate Government and A Short History of the Confederate States of America there.

Rice University's Papers of Jefferson Davis chronology records that Davis agreed in 1888 to begin work on another book. He completed the manuscript of A Short History in October 1889. Davis died two months later, before its publication.

Belford Company published the book in New York in 1890. The 1890 edition contains 505 pages.

== Content ==
In the introduction, Davis described his purpose as the "vindication of the Southern States" for their ordinances of secession. He framed the issue around what he regarded as the states' right to withdraw from the Union and the causes that, in his view, justified their exercise of that asserted right.

The first part of the book addresses the origins of the sectional conflict and Davis's constitutional case for secession. Its subjects include slavery and the slave trade, the expansion of slavery, the Missouri Compromise, the abolition movement, John Brown's raid on Harpers Ferry, the secession of South Carolina, and what Davis called the right of secession.

The second part recounts the establishment of the Confederate government and the course of the Civil War. Among its subjects are Fort Sumter, the Constitution of the Confederate States, the Confederate financial system, military campaigns in Virginia and the western theater, Confederate naval operations, foreign relations, the Vicksburg campaign, the Battle of Gettysburg, Fort Pillow, the exchange and treatment of prisoners of war, and the surrender at Appomattox.

== Historical interpretation ==
Historian Lynda Lasswell Crist has described Davis after the Civil War as a symbol of the Lost Cause and a revered figure among many white Southerners. The Papers of Jefferson Davis project similarly states that, as the Lost Cause gained momentum during the final decade of Davis's life, he became one of its leading voices.

Louisiana State University Press describes A Short History as part of Davis's postwar effort to defend the former Confederacy. Its description of the final volume of The Papers of Jefferson Davis states that the book sought to improve the Confederacy's reputation and to counter allegations of intentional mistreatment of Union prisoners.

== See also ==
- Confederate States of America
- The Rise and Fall of the Confederate Government
- Lost Cause of the Confederacy
