= States' Rights Party =

States' Rights Party may refer to:

- Dixiecrats or States' Rights Democratic Party, a short-lived (1948) segregationist political party in the United States
- States' Rights Party of Louisiana, organized in 1956 in opposition to racial integration of schools; see History of Louisiana
- National States' Rights Party, a far-right white supremacist party in existence in the U.S. from 1958 to 1987
- States' Rights Party, the party name used by the T. Coleman Andrews–Thomas H. Werdel presidential ticket in 1956

== See also ==
- States' rights (disambiguation)
