= The Rise and Fall of the Confederate Government =

1881 essay by Jefferson Davis

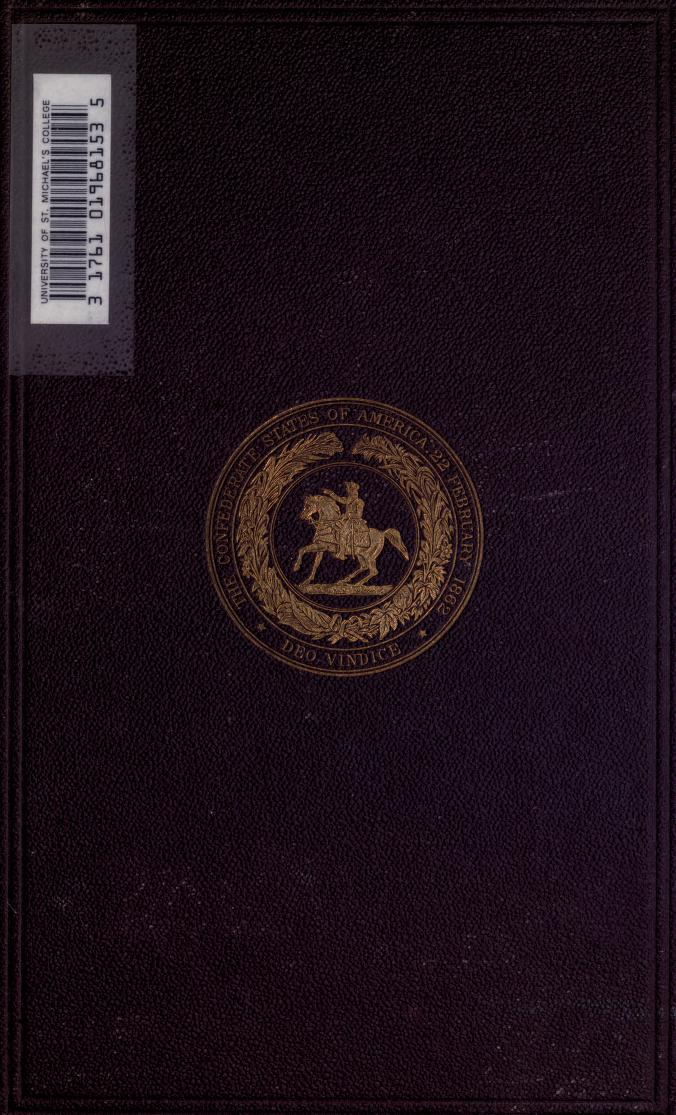
- Cover of the first edition
- Author: Jefferson Davis
- Language: English
- Subject: American Civil War
- Genre: History
- Published: 1881
- Publisher: D. Appleton & Company
- Publication place: United States
- Pages: 1,500
- ISBN: 0-306-80418-2
- OCLC: 424292
- Dewey Decimal: 973.713
- LC Class: E487.D263
- Followed by: A Short History of the Confederate States of America

The Rise and Fall of the Confederate Government is an 1881 two-volume work by Jefferson Davis, who served as President of the Confederate States of America during the American Civil War. The work presents Davis's account of the formation and government of the Confederate States of America and of the war, while arguing that the Southern states possessed a constitutional right to secede from the Union. Historians have characterized the work as a Confederate apologia and as a contribution to the literature of the Lost Cause of the Confederacy.

== Background and writing ==
In December 1876, writer Sarah Anne Ellis Dorsey invited Davis to Beauvoir, her estate near Biloxi, Mississippi, where he could work on his memoirs. Davis moved there the following month and began dictating The Rise and Fall of the Confederate Government to Dorsey in February 1877. Dorsey died in 1879 and left Beauvoir to Davis in her will.

Davis spent about three years writing the two volumes and assembled a substantial body of material in the process. Historian John F. Stover later wrote that much of the material was of historical interest and that some of it was otherwise difficult to find.

== Publication ==
D. Appleton & Company published The Rise and Fall of the Confederate Government in two volumes in New York in 1881.

Nearly the entire first volume is devoted to Davis's attempt to justify the Southern position on secession. Its latter portion contains appendices including speeches and correspondence, and presents the Constitution of the United States and the Constitution of the Confederate States in parallel columns. The second volume principally recounts the Confederate war effort from late 1861 through the end of the Civil War.

Davis later brought a lawsuit against D. Appleton & Company. Historian Thomas A. Bryson examined the lawsuit in a 1971 article in the Journal of Mississippi History.

== Content ==
Davis stated in the preface that one of his principal purposes was to demonstrate that the Southern states possessed the right to withdraw from the Union and that the federal government's denial of that right violated what he regarded as the constitutional compact among the states. He treated the Constitution as a compact among sovereign states and argued that the states retained sovereignty within the federal system.

Davis denied that slavery was the cause of the sectional conflict, describing it instead as an "incident", and portrayed slavery as comparatively humane. He instead framed the sectional conflict principally as a dispute over states' rights, constitutional authority, and the relationship between the states and the federal government. The book has been identified as a leading example of Lost Cause writing, with minimization of the role of slavery in the conflict.

The work also contains extensive criticism of the administration of Abraham Lincoln. Davis criticized restrictions on freedom of speech and the press, declarations of martial law, the suspension of habeas corpus, and federal confiscation policies. He contrasted those measures with what he presented as the Confederacy's greater adherence to constitutional limitations, while giving comparatively little attention to the Confederate government's own military draft, impressment of civilian property, declarations of martial law, and suspensions of habeas corpus.

The second volume largely recounts Confederate military operations and the conduct of the war. Stover observed that Davis's partisanship is readily apparent throughout the work, but nevertheless regarded it as a valuable source for Davis's own views and experiences as Confederate president.

== Reception ==
The book did not sell well upon its original publication. It was received tepidly in the North and its price ranged from $10 for the cloth edition to $20 for a more expensive binding, placing it beyond the means of many impoverished former Confederates.

Oscar Wilde praised the book during his 1882 American lecture tour, calling it “a masterpiece", although he found its detailed accounts of military operations burdensome. Wilde later visited Davis at Beauvoir and described him as a man of “the keenest intellect”.

Stover described the work as an "apologia in retrospect" and emphasized Davis's evident partisanship, while nevertheless regarding it as valuable for its account of Davis's views and experiences. Dirck similarly characterized the book as legalistic and self-justifying, as well as “dry” and “colorless,” noting that Davis did not acknowledge mistakes by either himself or the Confederacy.

== See also ==
- Lost Cause of the Confederacy
- A Short History of the Confederate States of America
