= Interposition =

United States legal theory

Interposition is a legal theory that U.S. states have the right to interpose when the U.S. federal government violates the rights of their citizens. The theory was first articulated by James Madison in the Virginia Resolution of 1798. Interposition was invoked by supporters of school segregation, including James J. Kilpatrick, in opposition to the United States Supreme Court's decision in Brown v. Board of Education, leading several states to pass resolutions asserting the right to interpose.

== See also ==
- Nullification (U.S. law)

== Sources ==
- Cogan, Neil H. (2014). "Introduction". In Cogan, Neil H. (ed.). Union and States' Rights: 150 Years After Sumter, A Legal History of Interposition, Nullification, and Secession. Akron, Ohio: University of Akron Press. pp. 1–10. ISBN 978-1-937378-39-4. Project MUSE book 26250.
- Fritz, Christian G. (2014). "Interposition: An Overlooked Tool of American Constitutionalism". In Cogan, Neil H. (ed.). Union and States' Rights: 150 Years After Sumter, A Legal History of Interposition, Nullification, and Secession. Akron, Ohio: University of Akron Press. pp. 165–203. ISBN 978-1-937378-39-4. Project MUSE book 26250.
- Levinson, Sanford (2016). "The 21st Century Rediscovery of Nullification and Secession in American Political Rhetoric: Frivolousness Incarnate, or Serious Arguments to Be Wrestled With?". In Levinson, Sanford (ed.). Nullification and Secession in Modern Constitutional Thought. Lawrence, Kansas: University Press of Kansas. pp. 10–52. ISBN 978-0-7006-2298-6. Project MUSE book 47527.
