= When a man argues against two beautiful ladies like this, they are going to have the last word =

Joke made during oral arguments in Roe v. Wade

Floyd's joke and the ensuing silence

On December 13, 1971, during oral arguments before the United States Supreme Court in the abortion rights case Roe v. Wade, Texas assistant attorney-general Jay Floyd prefaced his remarks with a reference to his opposing counsel, Sarah Weddington and Linda Coffee: "It's an old joke, but when a man argues against two beautiful ladies like this, they are going to have the last word." The joke was met with silence in the courtroom and, according to abortion rights lawyer Margie Pitts Hames, visible resentment from Chief Justice Warren E. Burger. Widely viewed as sexist and often considered "the worst joke in legal history", Floyd's attempt at humor has been cited by commentators including Justice Antonin Scalia as a cautionary tale about comedy in court.

Floyd did not recover from the faux pas and struggled in the rest of his remarks, twice being laughed at by the audience. Justice Harry Blackmun cited poor arguments by both Floyd and Weddington among his reasons for supporting an order to reargue the case the following term. On reargument, Floyd was replaced by his supervisor Robert C. Flowers. The court ultimately ruled in favor of plaintiff Jane Roe (Norma McCorvey), a landmark decision that established a right to an abortion. Roe was overturned in 2022 in Dobbs v. Jackson Women's Health Organization.

== Oral arguments ==
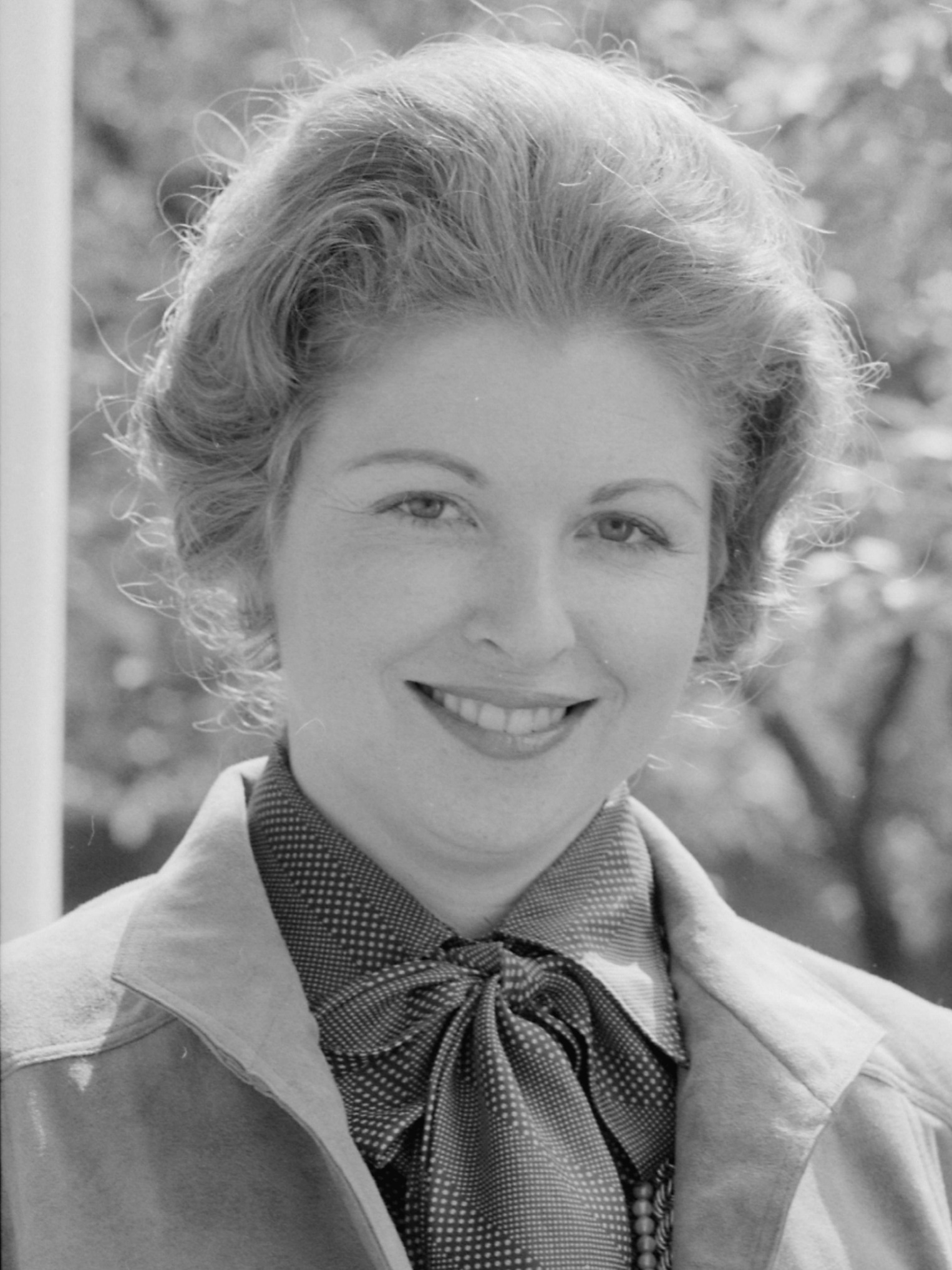
Sarah Weddington (pictured in 1978) argued in defense of Norma McCorvey ("Jane Roe").

Roe v. Wade arose from the attempt of a pseudonymous "Jane Roe" (Norma McCorvey) to obtain an abortion in the U.S. state of Texas. Abortions were illegal in Texas in most cases, leading to a legal battle through the federal courts, nominally against Henry Wade, the Dallas County district attorney. The Supreme Court of the United States granted certiorari after the Northern District of Texas ruled in McCorvey's favor, and heard oral arguments on December 13, 1971.

McCorvey was represented by two women, Sarah Weddington and Linda Coffee. Weddington was 26 years old when she argued before the Supreme Court in Roe. She had been one of five women in her graduating class of 250 at University of Texas Law School two years prior. Only seven women had spoken before the court in the preceding twelve months; there was no women's restroom in the lawyers' lounge. According to court artist Betty Wells and Justice Harry Blackmun, Weddington looked attractive. Coffee sat beside her at the table for petitioners' counsel. A number of abortion rights advocates sat in the audience. As counselor for the petitioner, Weddington spoke first. She spoke with an argument style that Mairi N. Morrison in the UCLA Women's Law Journal described as "classically female and extraordinarily effective". She reserved a few minutes of her time for rebuttal, meaning that she would speak again briefly after Orbie J. "Jay" Floyd, the Texas assistant attorney general who represented Wade.

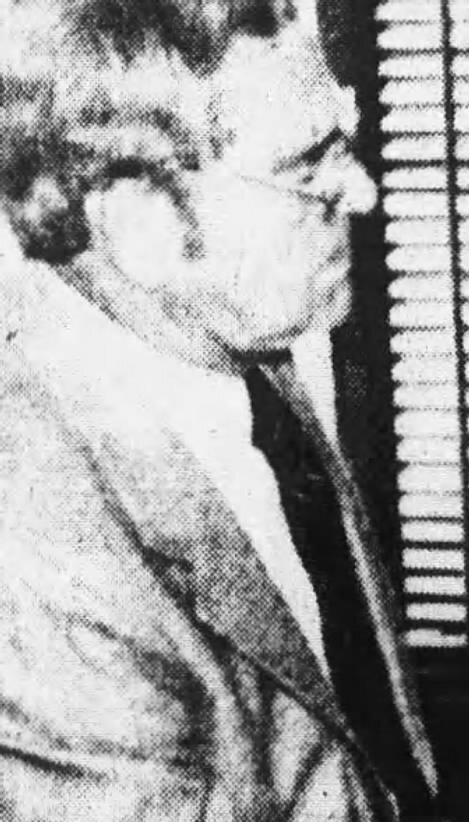
Jay Floyd (pictured in 1977) argued for Texas.

After being introduced by Chief Justice Warren E. Burger, Floyd began,

Mr. Chief Justice and may it please the Court. (Note: "Mr. Chief Justice and may it please the Court" is the traditional way to begin oral arguments before the U.S. Supreme Court.) It's an old joke, but when a man argues against two beautiful ladies like this, they are going to have the last word.

About three seconds of total silence ensued. Margie Pitts Hames, another abortion rights lawyer who was present, later said: "I thought Burger was going to come right off the bench at him. He glared him down. He got the point right away that this was not appropriate in that court." May It Please the Court, a narrated selection of Supreme Court oral arguments, describes Burger as "annoyed" and the resulting silence as "embarrassed".

Floyd was audibly flustered and struggled to recover from the initial blunder. He faltered in the rest of his remarks, sometimes contradicting himself or speaking based on personal opinion. At two junctures, the audience laughed at his expense, which he appeared to take exception to. However, Justice Harry Blackmun, who privately ranked all lawyers' arguments using letter grades, gave Floyd a B to Weddington's C+. Weddington later said that she thought the incident "unnerved [Floyd] somewhat".

== Analysis ==
The joke is widely considered to have been sexist and disrespectful. Hames called it "very chauvinistic". Weddington felt that Floyd "had argued too many cases in rural Texas, where a little humor would have been received better". Similarly, Justice Antonin Scalia (who was not on the court at the time) and scholar Bryan A. Garner attributed the faux pas to "what [Floyd] probably considered courtly Southern humor".

Elizabeth A. Delfs in the Women's Rights Law Reporter holds Floyd's joke as an example of complimentary comments about women attorneys' appearances that suggest their success comes from being attractive rather than being competent. Ruth Colker in the Harvard Women's Law Journal argues that the joke betrayed "[t]he lack of respect for women embedded in Texas's position". From this she concludes that abortion rights activists were right to pursue constitutional litigation, because "real dialogue is not possible when a base of respect does not exist".

Rachel L. DiCioccio and Laura E. Little in Temple Law Review see the joke as a "throwback to an earlier era (pre-1960s)" and write that Floyd, in attempting to use identification humor (connecting with the all-male panel of justices), instead engaged in the more divisive practice of differentiation humor (mocking Weddington and Coffee for being different from the men). From a semantic perspective, Serge V. Gavenko writes, while the comment was at face value positive, it violated Grice's maxims with respect to relevance and was incongruous given the importance of the proceedings. Bret Rappaport describes the joke as an instance of "breaking the genre" (i.e. the social construct between litigator and judge), a high-risk, high-reward strategy that in Floyd's case "represents clearly what not to do". He contrasts this with parts of judicial dissents by Chief Justice John Roberts and Judge Alex Kozinski that were, respectively, written like a crime novel and a conversation between defendant and attorney.

== Legacy ==
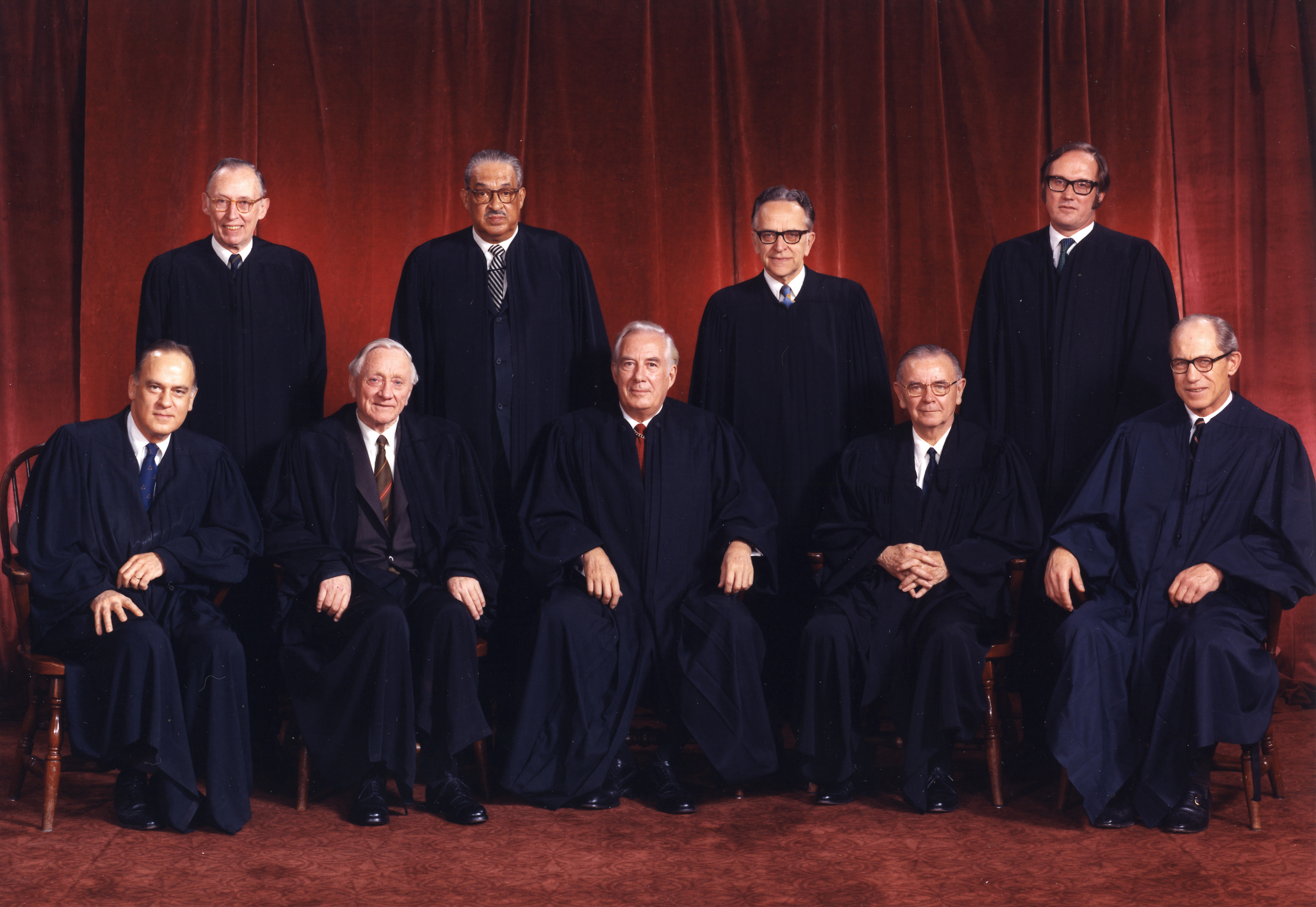
The Burger Court in 1973. Justices Lewis F. Powell Jr. (back left) and William Rehnquist (back right) were on the court for the second round of oral arguments, but not the first.

After six months of internal deliberations, the court ordered for the case to be reargued. Justice Blackmun supported the order in part because of his dissatisfaction with both Floyd and Weddington's oral arguments. On reargument, Texas instead sent Floyd's supervisor, Robert C. Flowers. The case was subsequently decided in favor of McCorvey, establishing a constitutional right to abortion, which persisted until the decision was overturned in Dobbs v. Jackson Women's Health Organization in 2022. Floyd subsequently served as an advisor to Governor Dolph Briscoe before entering private practice; he died in 1996.

Floyd's joke has become a textbook example of inappropriate use of humor in legal settings: Scalia and Garner, in their book Making Your Case: The Art of Persuading Judges, cite the mishap to illustrate why litigators should not tell prepared jokes, which "almost invariably bomb". The flubbed joke is used for comic relief in Robert Schenkkan's play All the Way and in the introduction to episodes of the Supreme Court podcast Strict Scrutiny. Jerry Goldman, the founder of the Oyez Project, has called it "[t]he most compelling example of silence pregnant with meaning".

In 2013, Geoffrey Sant in Salon described it as the "Worst Joke in Legal History", claiming the title over seven other contenders including Don West's knock-knock joke during the trial of George Zimmerman. Sant refers to the joke's deployment, in the high-profile context of Roe, as "spoiled icing on the collapsed cake", and cites one law blogger who refers to it as the worst joke of all time outright. Sant's characterization has since been repeated in a New York Times obituary of Weddington; in The Independent, SCOTUSblog, The Washington Post, and the blog of the National Constitution Center; and by Becca Andrews in the book No Choice. Janet S. Kole in the ABA Journal differs somewhat, holding that the worst legal joke is another of Sant's picks, a Supreme Court litigator who in Glickman v. Wileman Brothers & Elliott, Inc. told Justice Scalia "you don't want to give your wife diarrhea" by buying green plums.
