= List of Yeshiva University people =

This is a list of notable people associated with Yeshiva University, a private university in New York City. The list includes alumni, attendees, and faculty members past and present of the university.

== Notable alumni ==
=== Academia ===
- David Berger (born 1943), dean emeritus at Bernard Revel Graduate School of Judaic Studies
- Michael Broyde (born 1964), law professor
- Shaye J. D. Cohen (B.A. 1970), professor of Hebrew Literature & Philosophy at Harvard
- Samuel J. Danishefsky, professor of Chemistry at Columbia University and the Sloan-Kettering Cancer Center in New York
- Laurence Dreyfus, professor, Bach Scholar, and fellow of Magdalen College, Oxford
- Ari L. Goldman, Columbia University professor and journalist
- Paul Gottfried, former professor at Elizabethtown College
- Hyman B. Grinstein (1899–1982), professor of American Jewish History
- Gary Gruber, author, physicist, testing expert, educator
- A. Leo Levin (1919–2015), University of Pennsylvania Law School law professor
- Matthew Levitt, counterterrorism expert
- Emanuel Rackman (1910–2008), Modern Orthodox rabbi; president of Bar-Ilan University
- Michael Rosenak, Israeli philosopher of Jewish education
- Leonard Susskind, Felix Bloch professor of physics at Stanford University
- Steven Winter, Walter S. Gibbs Professor of Constitutional Law at Wayne State University Law School

=== Law ===
- Jeff Ballabon, lawyer
- Noach Dear (1953–2020), New York Supreme Court judge
- Alan Dershowitz, attorney, attended BTA
- Sandra J. Feuerstein, judge of the United States District Court for the Eastern District of New York
- Jason Greenblatt, U.S. special representative for International Negotiations, executive vice president and chief legal officer to Donald Trump and The Trump Organization
- Nat Lewin, attorney
- Abraham David Sofaer, judge of the United States District Court for the Southern District of New York
- Shalom David Stone, attorney; nominee for the Third US Circuit Court of Appeals

=== Government and politics ===
- Howard Dean, governor of Vermont, physician (medical degree)
- Louis Henkin, jurist
- Daniel Kurtzer, former ambassador to Egypt and Israel
- Olga A. Mendez, chairwoman of the New York State Senate Labor Committee
- Grace Meng, congresswoman from New York (J.D.)
- Sheldon Silver, speaker of New York State Assembly 1994

=== Arts and media ===
- Elon Gold, actor and comedian of Stacked fame, attended MTA
- Eddie Huang, chef, writer, and television personality (J.D. 2008)
- Lucy Kaplansky, singer-songwriter
- Aaron Klein, reporter, radio personality, author
- Yaakov Lemmer, chazzan
- Barbara Olson, television commentator
- Chaim Potok, author, most notably of The Chosen
- Josh Saviano, actor
- Nachum Segal, radio host
- Ari Shaffir, comedian, actor, podcaster, writer, and producer
- Laura Sydell, National Public Radio

=== Religion ===
- Nachman Bulman, rabbi
- Shlomo Einhorn, dean of Yavneh Hebrew Academy
- Chaim (Howard) Jachter, rabbi
- Meir Kahane, Orthodox rabbi and Knesset member, attended BTA
- Ezra Labaton, rabbi
- Aharon Lichtenstein, rabbi
- Haskel Lookstein, rabbi
- Moses Mescheloff, rabbi
- Avigdor Miller, Haredi rabbi
- Shlomo Riskin, rabbi
- Hershel Schachter, rabbi
- Harold M. Schulweis, rabbi
- Meir Soloveichik, rabbi and public thinker
- Joseph Telushkin, rabbi, lecturer, and author
- Moshe David Tendler, rabbi
- Moshe Weinberger, Haredi rabbi
- Mordechai Willig, rabbi
- Chaim Zimmerman, rabbi

=== Medicine and sciences ===
- Raymond Damadian, pioneer of MRI technology
- Samuel J. Danishefsky, chemist, winner of the Wolf Prize in Chemistry in 1995/96
- Hillel Furstenberg, mathematician
- Rudolph Leibel, medical researcher
- David Macht, pharmacologist
- Daniel Wise, mathematician
- Martin L. Yarmush, biomedical engineer and physician

=== Business ===
- Stan Kasten, president of the Los Angeles Dodgers, attended MTA
- Ralph Lauren, designer, attended MTA
- Mark Nordlicht, hedge fund manager
- David Samson, Miami Marlins executive (J.D. 1992)
- Ahmed Zayat, owner of American Pharoah, winner of the Kentucky Derby and Preakness Stakes

=== Other ===
- Baruch Goldstein, perpetrator of the Cave of the Patriarchs massacre
- Ryan Turell (born 1999), basketball player in the Israeli Basketball Premier League
- Randi Weingarten, president of the United Federation of Teachers

== Notable faculty and staff ==
- Danny Ayalon
- Samuel Belkin
- David Berger
- Saul J. Berman, author
- Benjamin Blech, author (also alumnus)
- J. David Bleich
- Elisheva Carlebach
- Shalom Carmy, theologian and Jewish historian (also alumnus)
- Pinkhos Churgin (1894–1957), first president of Bar-Ilan University
- Bernard Epstein
- Louis Feldman
- Steven Fine
- Joshua Fishman, linguist
- Jekuthiel Ginsburg
- Jason Greenblatt
- Paul Greengard, Nobel Prize winner
- Lawrence Hajioff, Judaic studies faculty
- Elazar Hurvitz, historian
- Richard Joel, president
- David Alan Johnson
- Ephraim Kanarfogel, dean and historian (also alumnus)
- Arthur Komar
- Joy Ladin, Gottesman Chair in English at Stern College for Women (2003–2021)
- Norman Lamm, chancellor (also alumnus)
- Joe Lieberman, US senator
- Bernard Madoff, former chairman and treasurer of the board of directors of the Sy Syms School of Business
- Rachel Mesch, scholar of French literature, history, and culture
- Marysa Navarro, historian
- Adam Zachary Newton
- Michael Rosensweig
- Oliver Sacks, neurologist
- Hershel Schachter, rabbi (also alumnus)
- Jacob J. Schachter
- Barry Scheck, lawyer
- Lawrence Schiffman
- Shimon Shkop
- Eli Baruch Shulman
- Nahum Slouschz
- Joseph B. Soloveitchik, The Rav (deceased), rabbi and talmudist
- Telford Taylor (deceased), lawyer
- Moshe Tendler, rabbi and medical ethics authority (also alumnus)
- Bob Tufts, former MLB pitcher
- Mayer Twersky, rabbi
- Abraham Weiss (1895–1970), professor of Talmud
- Mordechai Willig, Rosh Kollel (also alumnus)
- Rachel Wischnitzer
- Herman Wouk, author
- Benjamin Yudin, rabbi
- Dov Zakheim, political adviser
- Solomon Zeitlin
