= May It Please the Court (disambiguation) =

"May it please the court" is a formality used in legal proceedings; see Please § Origin and understanding and Appellate procedure in the United States.

May It Please the Court primarily refers to a 2022 South Korean television series.

May It Please the Court may also refer to:

- "May It Please the Court" (Picket Fences), season 3 episode 8 (1994)
- May It Please The Court: A Biography of Judge Robert R. Merhige, Jr. (1992), a book by Ronald J. Bacigal
- May It Please the Court: The Most Significant Oral Arguments Made Before the Supreme Court Since 1955 (1993), a book and its sequels by Peter Irons

== See also ==
- "Mr. Chief Justice and may it please the Court. It's an old joke, but when a man argues against two beautiful ladies like this, they are going to have the last word", an infamous joke
