= Yeshivah of Flatbush =

School in Brooklyn

- ישיבת פלטבוש
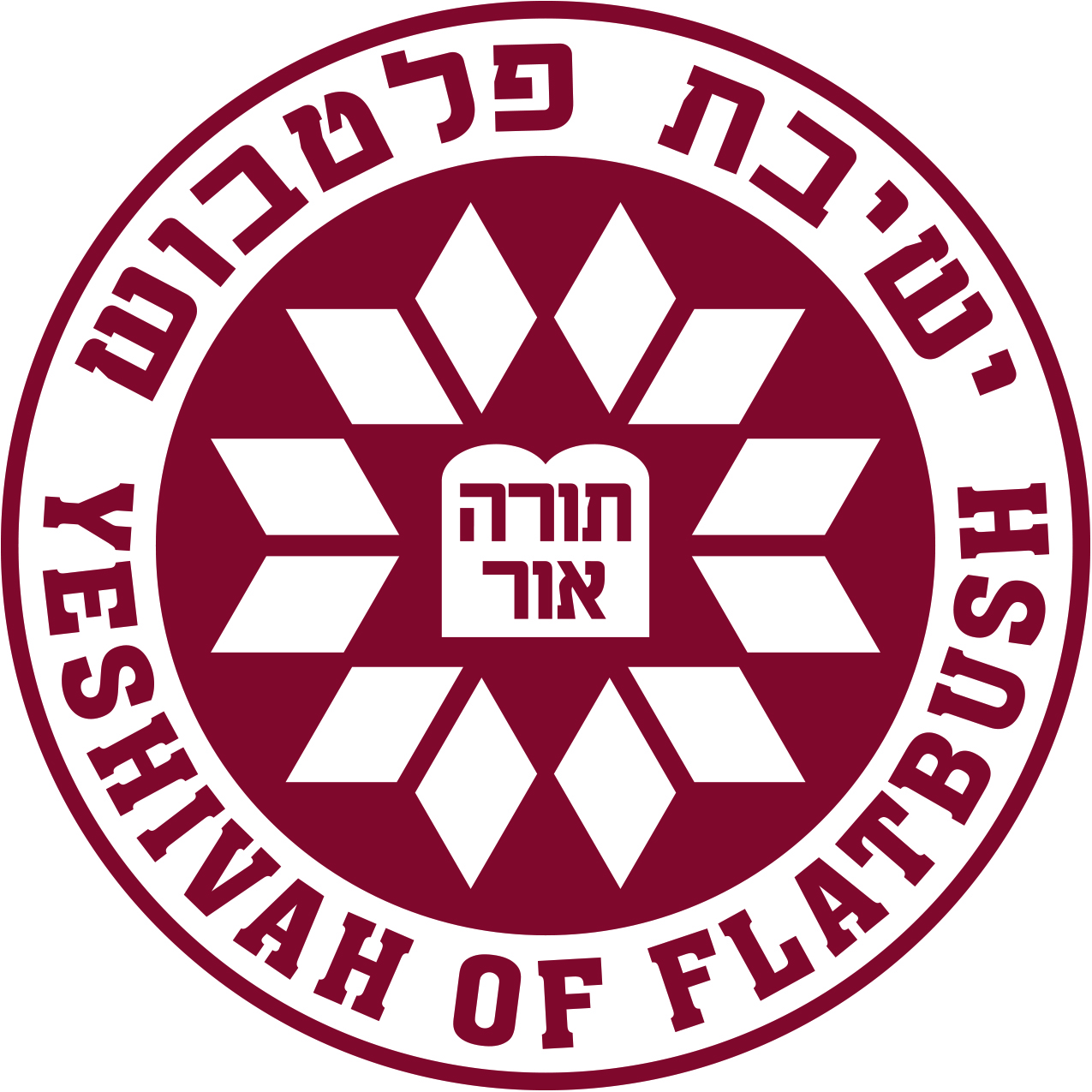

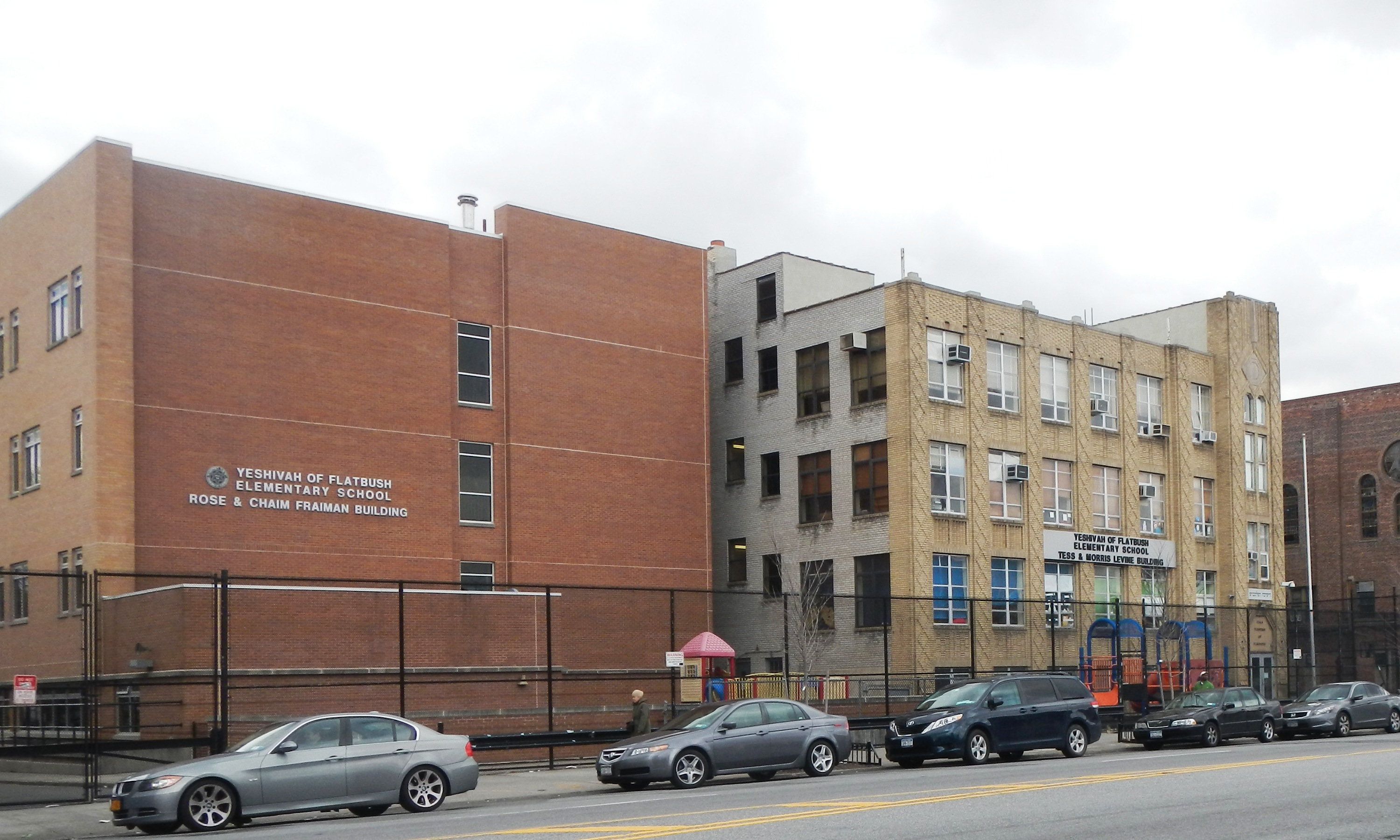
- Elementary school

Location
- 919 East 10th Street (elementary); 1609 Avenue J (high school); Brooklyn, New York; United States; 40°37′32″N 73°57′36″W

Information
- Other name: YOF
- Type: Private, Jewish day school, College-prep
- Motto: The Standard of Excellence; אם אין קמח אין תורה; Im ein kemach ein Torah (Without work [literally: flour] there is no Torah)
- Religious affiliation: Modern Orthodox Judaism
- Established: 1927
- Founder: Joel Braverman
- Head of elementary school: Yahel Tsaidi
- Head of school: Joseph Beyda
- Grades: Atidenu (preschool)–12
- Enrollment: 2,500
- Colors: Maroon and gold
- Mascot: Freddy the Falcon
- Team name: Falcons
- Newspaper: The Phoenix
- Yearbook: Summit
- Website: www.flatbush.org

The Yeshivah of Flatbush (YOF) is a Modern Orthodox private Jewish day school located in the Midwood section of Brooklyn, New York. It educates students from age 2 to age 18 and includes an early childhood center, an elementary school, and a High School.

== History ==
The Yeshivah of Flatbush (YOF) was founded in 1927 by Joel Braverman, among others. The school, which at first was located on East 10th Street in Midwood, Brooklyn (a neighborhood sometimes identified with nearby Flatbush), at first consisted of an early childhood program, an elementary school, and a middle school. The high school, founded in 1950 to complement the elementary school, was originally housed in an adjoining building. In 1962, the high school moved into a new building on nearby Avenue J, and the elementary school expanded into what was formerly the high school building.

== Hebrew ==
The school incorporates Hebrew into Judaic Studies to enable its students to achieve fluency in the Hebrew language.

== Student demographics ==
YOF comprises Jewish students and teachers from a variety of backgrounds. In the past, more than half of the students were Ashkenazi Jews whose families originated from communities in Germany, Poland, Eastern Europe, and Russia. In recent years, the majority has shifted to students of Sephardic and Mizrahi Jewish descent. The overwhelming number of Sephardic students can be attributed to the growth of the Syrian Jewish community in Flatbush, and the decline in Ashkenazi enrollment can be attributed to the movement of Modern Orthodox communities to Long Island and New Jersey, with a concomitant increase in the number and quality of Jewish day schools and yeshivot in those areas. In 2022, the lower school consisted of 1,400 students.

== Leadership ==
David Eliach was the principal emeritus, following a decades-long tenure as principal of the high school. In later years, Raymond Harari, an alumnus of Yeshivah of Flatbush High School, served as the "head of school" of the high school, followed by Joseph Beyda.

The Elementary School, formerly led by Lawrence Schwed, is currently headed by Yahel Tsaidi.

== Sports ==
Shorts teams are called the Flatbush Falcons and in most cases are members of the Metropolitan Yeshiva High School Athletic League.

== Notable alumni ==
- Arlene Agus (1949-2024), feminist and activist
- Howard Apfel, rabbi and expert on medical halacha and ethics
- Robert J. Avrech, Emmy Award-winning screenwriter
- David Berger, academic, expert in medieval Jewish history
- David Bernstein (born 1967), Professor, George Mason University School of Law and author
- Lee Bienstock (born 1983), finalist on The Apprentice 5.
- Baruch Samuel Blumberg (1925–2011), recipient of the 1976 Nobel Prize in Physiology or Medicine, identified the Hepatitis B virus
- Chaim Brovender, rosh yeshivah of Yeshivat HaMivtar
- Abraham Cooper (born 1950), rabbi who is the associate dean and director of Global Social Action Agenda for the Simon Wiesenthal Center
- Abraham Foxman (1940–2026), director of the Anti-Defamation League (1987–2015)
- Gideon Gartner (born 1936), founder of the Gartner Group
- Baruch Goldstein, perpetrator of the Cave of the Patriarchs massacre.
- Judith Hauptman (born 1943), feminist Talmudic scholar and professor at the Jewish Theological Seminary of America
- Neal Hendel (born 1952), former Israeli Supreme Court Justice
- Yehuda Henkin (1945–2020), Israeli posek
- Meir Kahane (1932–1990) (Elementary school graduate), founder of the Jewish Defense League and former Israeli Knesset member. Head of the Kach party
- Eric Kandel (born 1929), 2000 Nobel Prize laureate in Physiology or Medicine
- Elihu Katz (born 1926), American sociologist and founder of Israeli television
- Ira Katznelson (born 1944), American political scientist and historian, currently Ruggles Professor at Columbia University, and previously president of the Social Science Research Council and the American Political Science Association. He is a fellow of the American Academy of Arts and Sciences.
- Ezra Labaton (1950–2013), Modern Orthodox Rabbi, Philosopher, Educator, and Founding Rabbi of Congregation Magen David of West Deal
- Naomi Levy, member of the first class of women to enter the Jewish Theological Seminary of America, bestselling author and founder of Nashuva, The Jewish Spiritual Outreach Movement
- Isaac Mizrahi (born 1961), fashion designer
- Bertram L. Podell (1925–2005), former member of the United States House of Representatives from New York
- Dennis Prager (born 1948), public speaker and radio talk show host.
- Kenneth Prager, physician
- Samuel Schafler (1929–1991), rabbi, historian, editor and Jewish educator
- Charlie Shrem (born 1989), entrepreneur, bitcoin advocate, and convicted felon
- Joseph Sitt (born 1974), real estate investor who was founder of the real estate company Thor Equities
- Daniel Sperber, professor of Talmud at Bar-Ilan University and winner of the Israel Prize in 1992
- Joseph Telushkin (born 1948), author and speaker on Jewish topics
- Elana Maryles Sztokman (born 1969), author, researcher and feminist activist
- Joe Tacopina (born 1966), lawyer, media personality and professional sports executive
- Bruce Wasserstein (1947–2009), investment banker, businessman, and writer
- Wendy Wasserstein (1950–2006), playwright
- Larry Weinberg (1926–2019), former president of AIPAC and former owner of the Portland Trail Blazers
- Leon Wieseltier (born 1952), writer, editor of The New Republic
- Joel B. Wolowelsky, author and former Dean of the Faculty at the Yeshivah of Flatbush High School
- Alan Zelenetz (former Principal), co-founder of Ovie Entertainment, and comic book writer for Marvel Comics
- Efraim Zuroff (born 1948), Director of the Simon Wiesenthal Center, Israel
