= Frank Capra bibliography =

Books and essays about Frank Capra

A list of books and essays about Frank Capra:

- Capra, Frank; Schickel, Richard (1975). The Men who made the movies: interviews with Frank Capra, George Cukor, Howard Hawks, Alfred Hitchcock, Vincente Minnelli, King Vidor, Raoul Walsh, and William A. Wellman. I.R. Dee. ISBN 978-1-56663-374-1.
- Capra, Frank (1997). The Name Above the Title: An Autobiography. Lightning Source Incorporated. ISBN 978-0-306-80771-8.
- Carney, Raymond (1986). American Vision: The Films of Frank Capra. CUP Archive. ISBN 978-0-521-32619-3.
- Elliott, Matthew J. Tribute: Frank Capra. Bluewater Productions.
- Estrin, Allen (1980). Frank Capra: George Cukor : Clarence Brown. Tantivy Press.
- Ewing, Charles Burgess (1983). An Analysis of Frank Capra's War Rhetoric in the "why We Fight" Films. Washington State University.
- Glatzer, Richard; Raeburn, Jon (1975). Frank Capra: The Man & His Films. University of Michigan Press. ISBN 978-0-472-06195-2.
- Gunter, Matthew C. (30 November 2011). The Capra Touch: A Study of the Director's Hollywood Classics and War Documentaries, 1934-1945. McFarland. ISBN 978-0-7864-8828-5.
- Handzo, Stephen (1971). The Films of Frank Capra.
- Johnson, Barbara Pearce; Bohnenkamp, Dennis R.; Sam L. Grogg (1979). Frank Capra: Study Guide. American Film Institute.
- Maland, Charles J. (1980). Frank Capra. Twayne Publishers. ISBN 978-0-8057-9273-7.
- McBride, Joseph (1 February 2011). Frank Capra: The Catastrophe of Success. Univ. Press of Mississippi. ISBN 978-1-60473-839-1.
- Pearce, Frederick W. (1990). An Analysis of Frank Capra's Why We Fight Films (1942-1945) as Documentary Film Rhetoric. University of Pittsburgh.
- Poague, Leland A. (2004). Frank Capra: Interviews. Univ. Press of Mississippi. ISBN 978-1-57806-617-9.
- Poague, Leland (1994). Another Frank Capra. Cambridge University Press. ISBN 978-0-521-38978-5.
- Scherle, Victor; Levy, William Turner (1977). The Films of Frank Capra. Citadel Press. ISBN 978-0-8065-0430-8.
- Scherue, - Levy; Scherle, Victor; Levy, William Turner (May 1992). Complete Films of Frank Capra. Virgin Books Limited. ISBN 978-0-86369-630-5.
- Sklar, Robert. Leap Into the Void: Frank Capra's Apprenticeship to Ideology.
- Sklar, Robert; Zagarrio, Vito (1998). Frank Capra: Authorship and the Studio System. Temple University Press. ISBN 978-1-56639-608-0.
- Smoodin, Eric (23 December 2004). Regarding Frank Capra: Audience, Celebrity, and American Film Studies, 1930–1960. Duke University Press. ISBN 0-8223-8626-7.
- Willis, Donald C. (1974). The Films of Frank Capra. Scarecrow Press.
- Wolfe, Charles (1 January 1987). Frank Capra: A Guide to References and Resources. G.K. Hall. ISBN 978-0-8161-8507-8.
- Zagarrio, Vito (1995). Frank Capra Malgré Lui: A Filmmaker and the Contradictions of American Society, 1928-1934. New York University, Graduate School of Arts and Science.

== Individual films ==
It's a Wonderful Life

- Basinger, Jeanine; Trustees, Frank Capra Archives (Wesleyan University, Middletown, Conn.). (12 October 1986). The "It's a wonderful life" book. Knopf. ISBN 978-0-394-55605-5.
- Cox, Stephen (July 2004). It's a Wonderful Life: A Memory Book. Cumberland House. ISBN 978-1-58182-434-6.
- Hawkins, Jimmy (21 November 1995). The It's a Wonderful Life: Trivia Book. Crown Publishing Group. ISBN 978-0-517-88627-4.
- Willian, Michael (1 October 2006). The Essential It's a Wonderful Life: A Scene-by-Scene Guide to the Classic Film. Chicago Review Press. ISBN 978-1-56976-428-2.
- A Structural Analysis of Frank Capra's It's a Wonderful Life. GRIN Verlag. June 2012. ISBN 978-3-656-21211-9.
