= Rebbe (disambiguation) =

Rebbe is a Yiddish word derived from the Hebrew word rabbi, which means "master, teacher, or mentor".

Rebbe may also refer to:

- Menachem Mendel Schneerson, due to his public prominence, called "The Rebbe"
- Rebbe (book), a biography of Schneerson
- Tyler Rebbe, bassist in the rock band Pulley

== See also ==
- Rabbi (disambiguation)
