= The Echoing Green (book) =

Nonfiction book by Joshua Prager

- 2006 Book jacket
- Author: Joshua Prager
- Subject: Baseball, New York state history, New York Giants history, Ralph Branca and Bobby Thomson
- Genre: nonfiction
- Set in: New York and Major League Baseball
- Published: 2006
- Publisher: Pantheon Books
- Publication place: United States
- Media type: Print, E-book, Audio
- Pages: 498
- ISBN: 9780375421549 or 0375421548
- OCLC: 64487310
- Dewey Decimal: 796.357/64097471
- LC Class: GV875.N42 P73 2006

The Echoing Green: The Untold Story of Bobby Thomson, Ralph Branca and the Shot Heard Round the World is a nonfiction book written by Joshua Prager and originally published by Pantheon Books in 2006. The book centers on the 1951 New York Giants scheme to read opposing catchers' finger signals relayed from catcher to pitcher with a telescope in the center-field clubhouse during the latter part of the 1951 Major League Baseball season. This led to baseball's famous Shot Heard 'Round the World, when Bobby Thomson hit a three-run homer in the bottom of the ninth inning against Brooklyn Dodgers pitcher Ralph Branca, resulting in winning the three game playoff series and the National League (NL) pennant, with a 5–4 win over the Dodgers. "It's been described as the greatest baseball game ever played, and you don't have to be a baseball fan to mark the anniversary." The book expands on an article that Prager wrote in 2001 for the Wall Street Journal.

== Background ==
=== 2001 Wall Street Journal article ===
Joshua Prager originally wrote about the signal-stealing scheme in a January 2001 article for The Wall Street Journal entitled "Was the '51 Giants Comeback a Miracle, Or Did They Simply Steal the Pennant?"

=== Tie-breaker series ===
The 1951 National League tie-breaker series was a best-of-three playoff series at the conclusion of Major League Baseball's (MLB) 1951 regular season to decide the winner of the National League (NL) pennant. The games were played on October 1, 2, and 3, 1951, between the New York Giants and Brooklyn Dodgers. It was necessary after both teams finished the season with identical win–loss records of 96–58. It is most famous for the walk-off home run hit by Bobby Thomson of the Giants in the deciding game, which has come to be known as baseball's "Shot Heard 'Round the World". Consequently, the Giants advanced to the 1951 World Series, in which they were defeated by the New York Yankees. In baseball statistics, the tie-breaker series counted as the 155th, 156th, and 157th regular season games by both teams; all events in the games were added to regular season statistics." The Dodgers rebounded to win the National League pennant in 1952, but lost the 1952 World Series to the Yankees four games to three. Thomson's dramatic three-run homer came in the ninth inning of the decisive third game of a three-game playoff for the pennant in which the Giants trailed, 4–1.
