= Jerome Cutler =

American rabbi

Rabbi Jerome Cutler

Personal life
- Born: New York City, New York, United States

Religious life
- Religion: Judaism
- Denomination: Conservative Judaism
- Synagogue: Creative Arts Temple, West Los Angeles, California
- Semikhah: Academy for Jewish Religion

Jerome "Jerry" Cutler is an American Conservative rabbi and the founder of the Creative Arts Temple in West Los Angeles, California.

== Personal life ==
Cutler was born in New York City, the son of an Orthodox rabbi. He was ordained at the age of 24 and served at a Conservative congregation in Stamford, Connecticut.

He became a talent agent after several years performing as a comedian in the Catskills and Atlantic City. He soon moved to Los Angeles, where he worked as a publicist for American International Pictures' beach party films. In 1972, he founded the Synagogue for the Performing Arts for local Jews in show business, now led by Rabbi Joseph Telushkin.

Cutler was a content advisor to the cartoon Bible series, The Greatest Adventure: Stories from the Bible, produced by Hanna-Barbera.
