= For Goodness Sake =

For Goodness Sake may refer to:

- For Goodness Sake (musical), a 1922 Broadway musical starring Fred Astaire
- For Goodness' Sake, a 1935 mystery novel by Carolyn Wells
- "For Goodness Sake", a 1963 single released by singer Irma Thomas
- For Goodness Sake, a 1968 Southern gospel LP by the Thrasher Brothers that was nominated for the Grammy Award for Best Gospel/Contemporary Christian Music Performance
- "For Goodness Sake", a song by Kenneth Ascher and Paul Williams created for The Muppet Movie (soundtrack) (1979)
- For Goodness Sake (film), a 1992 short comedy film
- "For Goodness Sake", a 2006 song by the band Intwine
- For Goodness Sake, a 2008 sequel to the 1957 novel The World of Suzie Wong
- "For Goodness Sake", a 2015 song on the album Enlighten Me by Jaymay

== See also ==
- For Goodness Sakes, Look at Those Cakes
