= Bare Essentials =

- Genre: Comedy
- Written by: Allen Estrin; Mark Estrin
- Directed by: Martha Coolidge
- Starring: Gregory Harrison; Mark Linn-Baker; Lisa Hartman; Charlotte Lewis
- Music by: Scott Wilk
- Country of origin: United States
- Original language: English

Production
- Executive producer: Karen Mack
- Producer: Jay Benson
- Cinematography: Johnny E. Jensen
- Editor: Steven Cohen
- Running time: 94 minutes
- Production company: Republic Pictures

Original release
- Network: CBS
- Release: January 8, 1991

Bare Essentials is a 1991 American made-for-television comedy film starring Gregory Harrison, Mark Linn-Baker and Lisa Hartman. It was directed by Martha Coolidge and written by Allen Estrin and Mark Estrin.

== Plot ==
Gordon (Linn-Baker) and Sydney (Hartman) are both hard-working, over-stressed, and engaged and decide to take a short cruise. However, they end up getting lost and stranded on an island named Luhana. While there, they meet an American named Bill (Harrison) who has lived on the island for 3 years and also owns it. Eventually Sydney starts to fall for Bill. They take walks together and swim in the ocean. They wind up having sex under water. Meanwhile, Gordon's laid up since hurting his back after chopping down a palm tree to make a boat out of. Gordon meets Tarita who turns out to be Bill's girlfriend. When Sydney finds out, she's furious. The two couples end up playing Monopoly like they're at war. Gordon is falling for Tarita, who gave him a massage earlier which cured his back. Eventually, the couples switch partners for the better. But then, Sydney finds out that Bill has been hiding on the island because he's wanted for insider trading. She decides to turn him in to the police who eventually show up to rescue her and Gordon. She then decides not to, as she's grown very fond of him. She and Gordon start to head back home. But Gordon then jumps ship and swims back to Tarita. Sydney returns to New York, but realizes she misses Bill. She gets on a ferry to take her back to the island. Bill surprises her by showing up on the ferry, clean shaven and wearing a suit, to return to his old life in the city. He tells her he was framed and that his case has been settled. Gordon now owns Luhana. Sydney and Bill kiss as the movie ends.

== Cast ==
- Gregory Harrison as Bill Buzell
- Mark Linn-Baker as Gordon Perkins
- Lisa Hartman as Sydney Wayne
- Charlotte Lewis as Tarita

== Reception ==
In a contemporary review, Variety described the film as "mildly diverting" and that director Martha Coolidge "does a crisp job with what's she's got, though writers Allen Estrin and Mark Estrin don't offer much help with the repartee."The Los Angeles Times panned it as having a "Clothing-Thin Plot."

== Bibliography ==
- Prouty, Howard H., ed. (1994). Variety Television Reviews 1923-1992. Garland Publishing Inc. ISBN 0824037960.
