= Dennis Prager =

American conservative activist (born 1948)

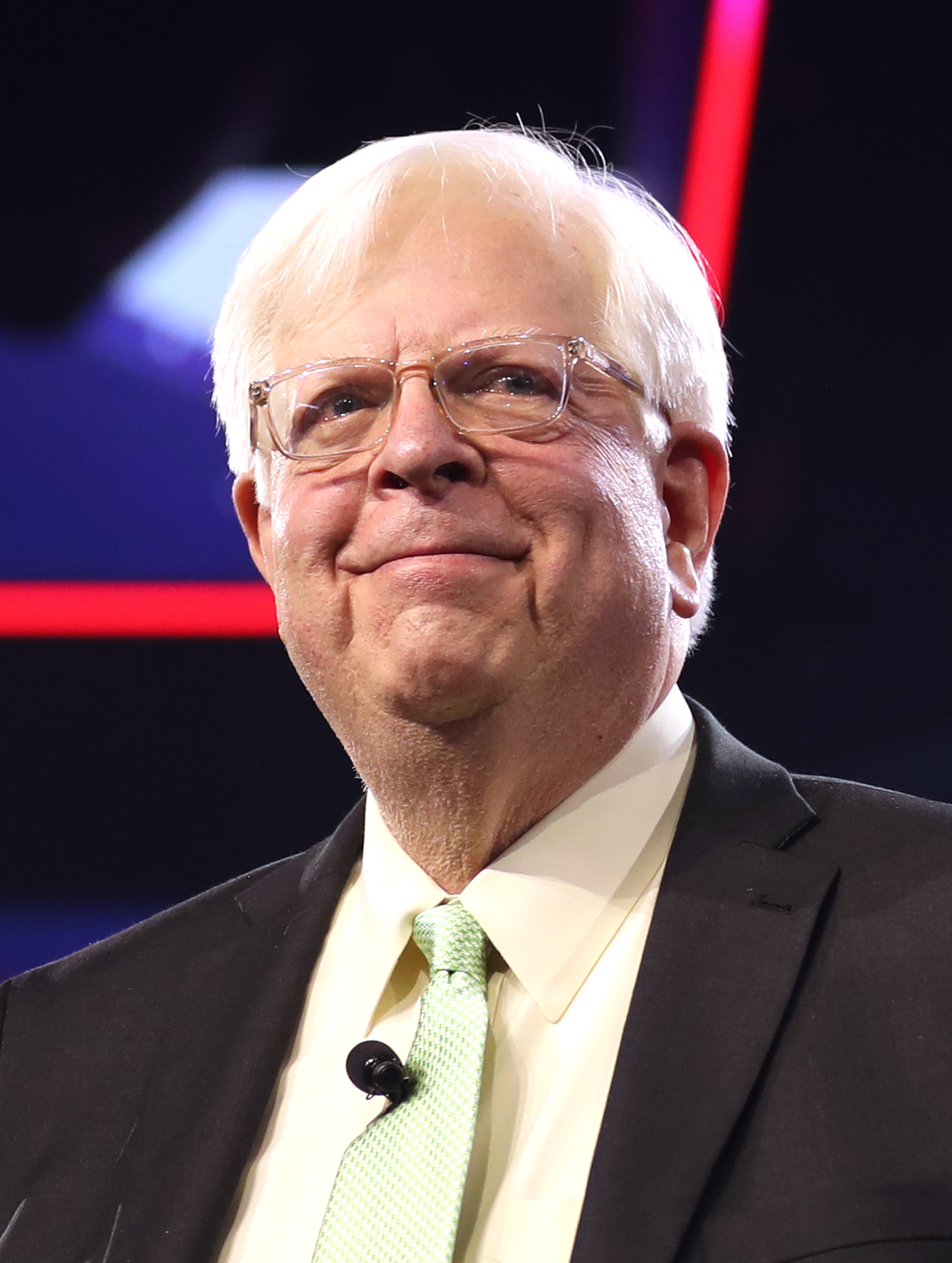
- Prager in 2023
- Born: August 2, 1948 (age 78); New York City, U.S.
- Education: Brooklyn College (BA); Columbia University
- Occupations: Radio host; political commentator; author
- Years active: 1970–present
- Known for: Founder of PragerU
- Spouses: Janice Adelsteins (m. 1981; div. 1986); Francine Stone (m. 1988; div. 2005); Susan Reeds (m. 2008)
- Children: 2 (1 adopted)
- Relatives: Kenneth Prager (brother); Joshua Prager (nephew)
- Prager's voice On religious people's views of the first presidency of Donald Trump
- Website: dennisprager.com

Dennis Mark Prager (/ˈpreɪɡər/; born August 2, 1948) is an American conservative radio talk show host, political commentator, and writer. He is the host of the nationally syndicated radio talk show The Dennis Prager Show. In 2009, he co-founded PragerU, which creates content advocating capitalism and promoting conservative viewpoints on various political, economic, and cultural topics.

His initial political work, starting in 1969, focused on the Refuseniks, Soviet Jews who were denied permission to emigrate. He gradually began offering more, and broader, commentary on politics.

In November 2024, Prager became paralyzed below the shoulders due to a fall.

== Early life and education ==
Dennis Mark Prager was born on August 2, 1948, in Brooklyn to Hilda (née Friedfeld; 1919–2009) and Max Prager (1918–2014), the latter the son of Polish Jewish immigrants. Prager and his brother, Kenneth Prager, were raised in a Modern Orthodox Jewish home. He attended the Yeshiva of Flatbush in Brooklyn, New York, where he befriended Rabbi Joseph Telushkin.

Prager attended Brooklyn College, where he double-majored in anthropology and history, and received a B.A. in 1970. He became a fellow at the Columbia University School of International and Public Affairs, and attended there from 1970 to 1972, while he also took courses at the University of Leeds. After he left graduate school, Prager left Modern Orthodoxy, but maintained many traditional Jewish practices; he remains religious. Prager holds an honorary Doctor of Laws from Pepperdine University.

== Career ==
=== Beginnings ===
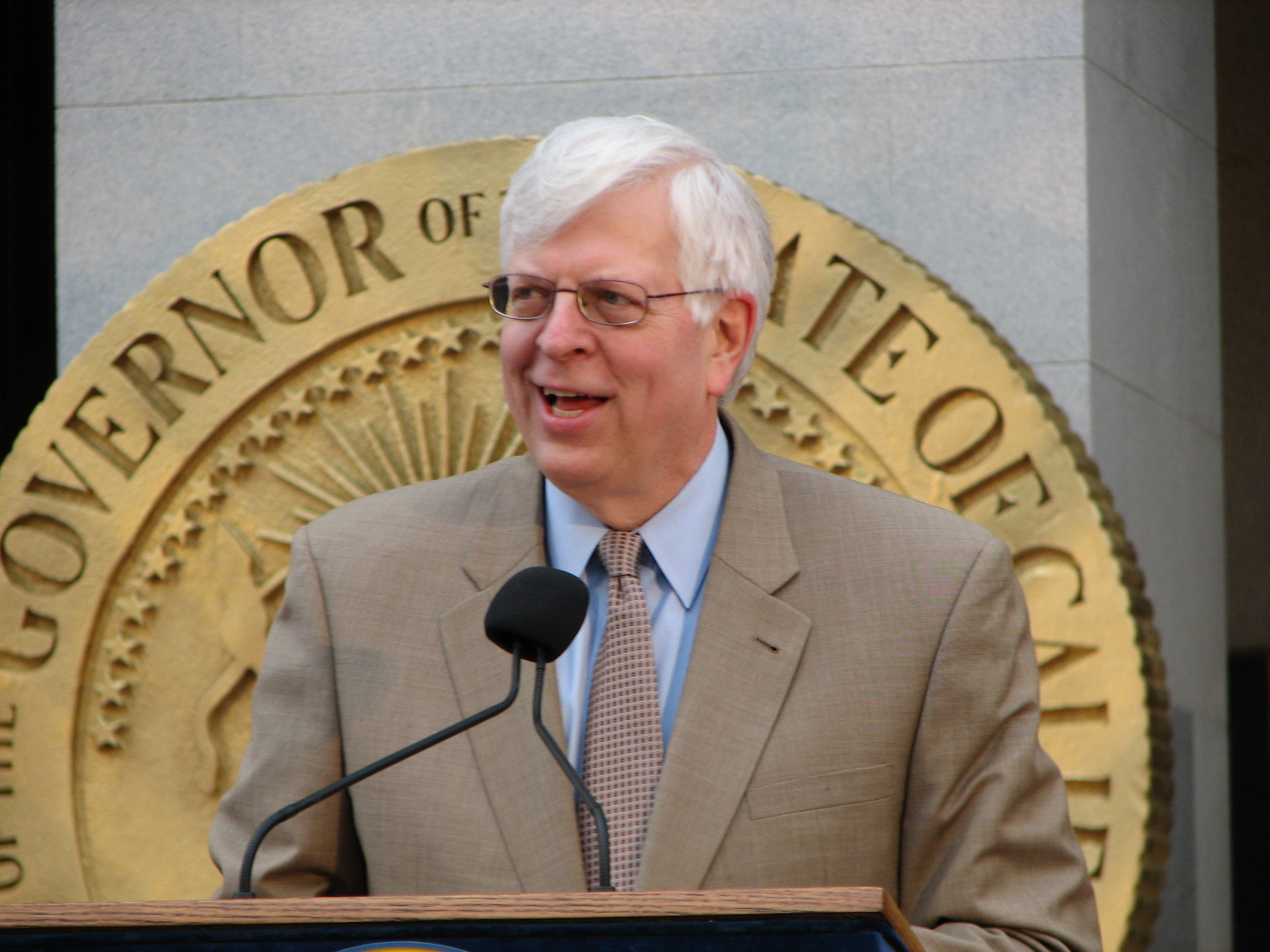
Prager speaking at the California Capitol Building in 2008

In 1969, while he was studying in England, he was recruited by the government of Israel to smuggle Jewish religious items into the Soviet Union, and smuggle out names of Jews. When he returned the next year, he was in demand as a speaker on repression of Soviet Jews; he earned enough from lectures to travel, and visited around sixty countries. He became the national spokesman for the Student Struggle for Soviet Jewry.

The start of Prager's career overlapped with a growing tendency among American Jews, who had been staunchly liberal, to move toward the center, and some to the right, driven in part by the influx of Jews from the Soviet Union. In 1975, Prager and Telushkin published an introduction to Judaism, intended for non-observant Jews: The Nine Questions People Ask About Judaism, which became a best-seller. Among the questions addressed in the text were: How does Judaism differ from Christianity, and can one doubt the existence of God and still be a good Jew, and how do you account for unethical, but religious, Jews?

Prager ran the Brandeis-Bardin Institute from 1976 to 1983; Telushkin worked with him there. It was Prager's first salaried job. He soon earned a reputation as a moral critic denouncing secularism and narcissism, both of which he said were destroying society; some people called him a Jewish Billy Graham.

=== 1980s ===
In 1982, KABC (AM) in Los Angeles hired Prager to host its Sunday night religious talk show, Religion on the Line, which got top ratings and eventually led to a week-day talk show. He and Telushkin published another book in 1983, Why the Jews? The Reason for Antisemitism.

According to a review in Commentary, the book depicts antisemitism as a "sinister form of flattery"; the authors wrote that hatred of Jews arises from resentment over Jews' acceptance of the doctrine that they are God's chosen people, charged with bringing a moral message to the world. The book describes Jews as both a nation (stateless for a long time) and followers of a religion. The authors write that this dual identity is essential to Judaism. The book also asserts that calls for Jews to culturally assimilate and oppose Zionism are both forms of antisemitism. The authors write that secular Jews are people who have lost their way, and who generally fall into the error of applying Judaism's mission to reform the world to ways that tend to be leftist, totalitarian, and destructive.

He also wrote a syndicated column for newspapers across the country. In 1985, Prager launched his own quarterly journal, Ultimate Issues, which was re-named The Prager Perspective in 1996.

In 1986, he divorced, and underwent a year of therapy, which the Encyclopedia of Judaism says contributed to his 1999 book, Happiness Is a Serious Problem. In 1990, he wrote an essay called "Judaism, Homosexuality, and Civilization" that argued against normalizing homosexuality in the Jewish community, and society overall. He regarded sexual sins on a continuum of seriousness, ranging from pre-marital sex through celibacy, adultery, homosexuality, and bestiality to incest. He argued that confining sex to heterosexual marriage de-sexualized religion. De-sexualizing religion, according to Prager, was a great achievement of ancient Jewish tradition, an accomplishment worth fighting to retain.

=== 1990s ===
By 1992, he was re-married. By that time, he was, according to the Los Angeles Jewish Journal, a "fixture on local radio", and "a Jewish St. George battling the forces of secularity on behalf of simple 'goodness'". He was generally socially conservative, with some exceptions; he supported a woman's legal access to abortion (although he said it was usually "immoral"), and supported, and justified, sex between non-married consenting men and women. In 1992, he became involved with the Stephen S. Wise Temple, and gave talks there. He also began a week-day night talk show on KABC.

In 1994, Prager also broadcast for an hour each week-day, via satellite on WABC, KABC's sister station in New York, before doing his KABC show locally.

During the 1994–1995 television season, Multimedia Entertainment syndicated a show featuring Prager. Prager said he was "ambivalent about television as a medium for deep, intelligent programming", but that the show was "an incredible opportunity to reach a mass audience with my belief system". In 1995, he moved the studio audience on-stage with him where they could interact with him more directly.

== Political commentary ==
Prager supported Jimmy Carter in the 1976 US presidential election. In 1994, the Anti-Defamation League published a report on antisemitism in the Christian right movement; Prager, who aligned with the social and political conservatism of the Christian right, criticized the ADL and its report. In 1995, he urged conservative Jews to be open to working with conservative Christians, like the Christian Coalition. In 1995, he named Jacob Petuchowski, Eliezer Berkovits, Harold Kushner, C. S. Lewis, Richard John Neuhaus, Michael Novak, and George Gilder as the people who had influenced his theology the most.

In 1995, Prager criticized the Illinois Supreme Court decision in the Baby Richard case that removed a child from his adoptive parents. With KABC, he held a "Rally for Baby Richard", where he got support from actors Priscilla Presley, Tom Selleck, and John McCook.

In 1996, Prager testified in Congress in favor of the Defense of Marriage Act. Prager testified that "the acceptance of homosexuality as the equal of heterosexual marital love signifies the decline of Western civilization". Prager worked with Bob Dole's campaign in the 1996 presidential election; when polls prior to the election showed that the Dole campaign did not have much Jewish support, Prager said this was because many "American Jews are ignorant regarding the anti-Israel aspects of the current Democrat Party".

Since 1999, he has hosted a nationally-syndicated talk show on the conservative Christian radio station KRLA in Los Angeles. KRLA is part of the Salem Media Group that carries other conservative hosts, including James Dobson, Randall Terry, Janet Parshall, Sebastian Gorka, and Larry Elder. Salem is a key voice of the Christian right that seeks to change American politics, as well as the way that individual people live.

In 2006, Prager criticized Keith Ellison, the first Muslim elected to Congress, for announcing that he would use the Quran for the re-enactment of his swearing-in ceremony. Prager wrote: "Insofar as a member of Congress taking an oath to serve America and uphold its values is concerned, America is interested in only one book, the Bible. If you are incapable of taking an oath on that book, don't serve in Congress." In response, former New York City Mayor Ed Koch called for Prager to end his service on the United States Holocaust Memorial Museum Council.

In 2009, Prager joined other Salem Radio Network hosts to oppose the Affordable Care Act. In 2014, while same-sex marriage in the United States was in the process of being nationally legalized, he wrote that if that were to happen, then "there is no plausible argument for denying polygamous relationships, or brothers and sisters, or parents and adult children, the right to marry". In 2014, he also said that the "heterosexual AIDS" crisis was something "entirely manufactured by the Left".

Prager endorsed Donald Trump in the 2016 presidential election, but said that Trump was his "17th choice out of 17 candidates". He clarified that he "was not a Trump supporter, when there was a choice", but added, "There is no choice now." Prager had previously said that Trump was "unfit to be a presidential candidate, let alone president". Conor Friedersdorf of The Atlantic criticized Prager for endorsing Trump.

In 2017, Prager was invited to be a guest conductor for the volunteer orchestra of Santa Monica, California, as part of a fund-raising concert at the Walt Disney Concert Hall. Some of the orchestra members protested the invitation, which they considered promoting bigotry. The orchestra leader, Guido Lamell, had invited Prager because he admired him, as Prager often discussed, and promoted, classical music on his shows and had guest-conducted a few times in the past, and because he thought Prager's presence might help raise more money. Lamell called Prager "a great man, leader, and friend".

In April 2020, Prager called the COVID-19 lockdowns "the greatest mistake in the history of humanity". His views were criticized in The New York Times. In a 2020 video called "'Follow the Science' Is a LIE", Prager touted Sweden's response to COVID-19, and said, "Sweden is the proof that lockdowns are useless." A fact-check in December 2020 found Prager's claim false, as Sweden had higher rates of COVID infection and mortality than other Scandinavian countries.

In a November 2021 Newsmax interview, Prager argued that "irrational fears" about people not vaccinated against COVID-19 had wrongly made them "the pariahs of America, as I have not seen in my lifetime", more than gay men and intra-venous drug users during the AIDS crisis, who he inaccurately said had not been ostracized. The Independent called his comments "alarming revisionism". In the interview, Prager also called concerns about climate change "idiotic" and "irrational".

== PragerU ==
In 2009, Prager and his producer, Allen Estrin, started a website called PragerU. Despite what its name suggests, PragerU is not an academic institution, but, rather, creates videos on various topics from a conservative perspective. BuzzFeed News described PragerU as "one of the biggest, most influential, and, yet, least understood forces in online media". As of 2018, it spent around 40% of its annual $10 million budget on marketing, as each video is produced according to a consistent style. Videos cover topics such as "racism, sexism, income inequality, gun ownership, Islam, immigration, Israel, police brutality", and speech on college campuses. BuzzFeed News wrote that "the biggest reason PragerU has escaped national attention is that it mostly doesn't do Trump", or engage with the political news cycle. Some of its videos had viewer access restricted by YouTube in 2017.

== Personal life ==
Prager speaks English, French, Russian, and Hebrew. His brother, Kenneth Prager, is a physician and professor at Columbia University Irving Medical Center. His nephew, Joshua Prager, is a former writer for The Wall Street Journal. He and his second wife, Francine, adopted a son, Aaron Prager. He also has another son, David Prager.

In November 2024, Prager suffered a serious spinal cord injury as the result of a fall that left him paralyzed below the shoulders.

== Bibliography ==
In 2018, Prager published a commentary on the Book of Exodus; this was followed by another commentary on the Book of Genesis in 2019. Both were published by the Salem Media Group.

- The Nine Questions People Ask About Judaism (with Joseph Telushkin) (1986) ISBN 978-0-671-62261-9
- Think a Second Time (44 Essays on 44 Subjects) (1996) ISBN 978-0-06-098709-1
- Happiness Is a Serious Problem: A Human Nature Repair Manual (1999) ISBN 978-0-06-098735-0
- Why the Jews? The Reason for Antisemitism (with Joseph Telushkin) (2003) ISBN 978-0-7432-4620-0
- Still the Best Hope: Why the World Needs American Values to Triumph (2012) ISBN 978-0-06-198512-6
- The Ten Commandments: Still the Best Moral Code (2015) ISBN 978-1-62157-417-0
- The Ten Commandments: Still the Best Path to Follow (2015) (for children) ISBN 978-1-5113-1709-2
- The Rational Bible: Exodus (2018) ISBN 978-1-62157-772-0
- The Rational Bible: Genesis (2019) ISBN 978-1-62157-898-7
- The Rational Passover Haggadah (2022) ISBN 978-1-68451-258-4
- The Rational Bible: Deuteronomy: God, Blessings, and Curses (2022) ISBN 978-1-62157-900-7
- If There Is No God: The Battle Over Who Defines Good and Evil (2026) ISBN 978-0-06335-130-1

== Filmography ==
- For Goodness Sake, 1993
- For Goodness Sake II, 1996
- Baseball, Dennis, & the French, 2011
- No Safe Spaces, 2019

== See also ==
- American Jews in politics
- Judaism and politics
- Jewish conservatism
