= Mary Jane Bode =

American politician (1926–1998)

Member of the Texas House of Representatives from district 37-B
- In office December 21, 1977 – January 13, 1981
- Preceded by: Sarah Weddington
- Succeeded by: Terral R. Smith

Personal details
- Born: Mary Jane Goodpasture; July 28, 1926 Chicago, Illinois, U.S.
- Died: September 23, 1998 (aged 72) Barrington, Illinois, U.S.
- Party: Democratic

Mary Jane Goodpasture Bode (July 28, 1926 – September 23, 1998) was an American politician and journalist who served in the Texas House of Representatives from district 37-B from 1977 to 1981.

== Early life ==
Mary Jane Goodpasture was born on July 28, 1926, in Chicago, Illinois, to Basil M. Goodpasture and Margarite E. (Stinnett) Goodpasture. She moved to Texas and studied at the University of Houston. In the 1940s, she married Amadeo E. Carmignani of Galveston, Texas, with whom she had a daughter in 1949. However, the couple later divorced. In 1956, she moved to Austin, Texas, and started her career as a journalist for several newspapers, including the Austin American-Statesman. She was a capital correspondent for 10 years. She then married Austin journalist and broadcaster Winston Bode, and they divorced in the 1960s

== Political career ==
Bode began her career in 1968 when she ran for the Texas House of Representatives as a Democrat. She described herself as a "moderate liberal." Her run was unsuccessful and she then worked as press secretary for Texas attorney general John Hill. When the Sarah Weddington, the representative for Texas House seat 37-B left for a position in the Carter Administration, Bode took her seat, winning with less than 70 votes. She would later win reelection. However, she lost her seat in 1980 after a Republican surge from the prominent political career of Ronald Reagan.

== Later life and death ==
Following her political defeat, Bode continued journalism, but retired 1989. Throughout her life she had struggled with health ailments, including lockjaw, polio, Guillain-Barre Syndrome, and back surgery. She ultimately died of cancer at the age of 72 on September 23, 1998, at Goodshepard Hospital in Barrington, Illinois.
