= Glickman v. Wileman Brothers & Elliott, Inc. =

- Supreme Court of the United States

Decided June 25, 1997
- Full case name: Glickman v. Wileman Brothers & Elliott, Inc.
- Citations: 521 U.S. 457 (more)

Holding
- A government-imposed fee that forced fruit growers to contribute to collective product advertising for the sale of their fruits was an economic policy that did not trigger First Amendment scrutiny.

Court membership
- Chief Justice William Rehnquist Associate Justices John P. Stevens · Sandra Day O'Connor; Antonin Scalia · Anthony Kennedy; David Souter · Clarence Thomas; Ruth Bader Ginsburg · Stephen Breyer

Case opinions
- Majority: Stevens
- Dissent: Souter, joined by Rehnquist, Scalia; Thomas (except Part II)
- Dissent: Thomas, joined by Scalia (Part II only)

Glickman v. Wileman Brothers & Elliott, Inc., 521 U.S. 457 (1997), was a United States Supreme Court case in which the court held that a government-imposed fee that forced fruit growers to contribute to collective product advertising for the sale of their fruits was an economic policy that did not trigger First Amendment scrutiny.

== Background ==
California tree fruitgrowers, handlers, and processors organized as Wileman Brothers & Elliott, Inc. (Wileman Brothers) initiated administrative proceedings challenging the validity of various regulations contained in marketing orders promulgated by the Secretary of Agriculture (Dan Glickman) under the Agricultural Marketing Agreement Act of 1937 (AMAA). Congress enacted the AMAA to establish and maintain orderly agricultural-commodity marketing conditions and fair prices; the program, which is expressly exempted from the antitrust laws, displaces competition in favor of collective action in the discrete markets regulated. AMAA marketing orders set uniform prices, product standards, and other conditions for all producers in a particular market; must be approved by two-thirds of the affected producers; are implemented by committees of producers appointed by the Secretary; and impose assessments on producers for the expenses of their administration, including product advertising and promotion. The orders at issue assessed Wileman Brothers for, among other things, the cost of generic advertising of California nectarines, plums, and peaches. After the Department of Agriculture upheld the generic advertising regulations, Wileman Brothers sought review in this action, which was consolidated with enforcement actions brought by the Secretary. The district court upheld the orders and entered judgment for the Secretary, but the Ninth Circuit held that the Government enforced contributions to pay for generic advertising violated Wileman Brothers' commercial speech rights under the test set forth by the United States Supreme Court in Central Hudson Gas & Electric Corp. v. Public Service Commission.

== Opinion of the Court ==
Alan Jenkins argued for Glickman. Thomas E. Campagne argued Wileman Brothers & Elliot. During oral argument, one of the litigators in this case told Justice Scalia "you don't want to give your wife diarrhea" by buying green plums. The remark has been described as one of the worst jokes in legal history.

In the majority opinion, Justice John Paul Stevens observed that the growers agreed with the message conveyed by the advertising campaign. He distinguished this case from earlier cases where people were forced to spread messages that they vehemently disagreed with or would prefer to say nothing at all.

== Subsequent developments ==
The court later revisited the rationale of Glickman in United States v. United Foods, Inc..

== See also ==
- "When a man argues against two beautiful ladies like this, they are going to have the last word", another joke described as the worst in legal history
