= Henry Wade =

American lawyer (1914–2001)

Dallas County District Attorney
- In office 1951 – January 1988
- Preceded by: Will Wilson
- Succeeded by: John Vance

Personal details
- Born: Henry Menasco Wade; November 11, 1914 Rockwall County, Texas, U.S.
- Died: March 1, 2001 (aged 86) Dallas, Texas, U.S.
- Party: Democratic
- Education: University of Texas
- Occupation: Lawyer
- Known for: Prosecution of Jack Ruby; Roe v. Wade

Henry Menasco Wade (November 11, 1914 – March 1, 2001) was an American lawyer who served as district attorney of Dallas County from 1951 to 1988. He participated in two notable U.S. court cases of the 20th century: the prosecution of Jack Ruby for killing Lee Harvey Oswald, and the U.S. Supreme Court case that held abortion was a constitutional right, Roe v. Wade. In addition, Wade was district attorney when Randall Dale Adams, the subject of the 1988 documentary film The Thin Blue Line, was wrongfully convicted in the murder of Robert Wood, a Dallas police officer. After his term and death, Wade was criticized for his corruption, ranging from wrongful convictions to attitudes and certain comments on race.

== Early life ==
Wade, one of 11 children, was born in Rockwall County, Texas, outside Dallas. Wade, along with five of his seven brothers, entered the legal profession. Shortly after graduating from the University of Texas at Austin, in 1939, Wade joined the Federal Bureau of Investigation, headed by J. Edgar Hoover. Wade's assignment as special agent was to investigate espionage cases along the US East Coast and in South America. Wade served in the US Navy during World War II, participating in the invasions of the Philippines and Okinawa.

== Career ==
He was first elected Rockwall County Attorney. In 1947, Wade joined the Dallas County District Attorney's Office. He won election to the top job four years later, a position he held for 36 years, until his retirement in 1987.

=== John F. Kennedy assassination ===
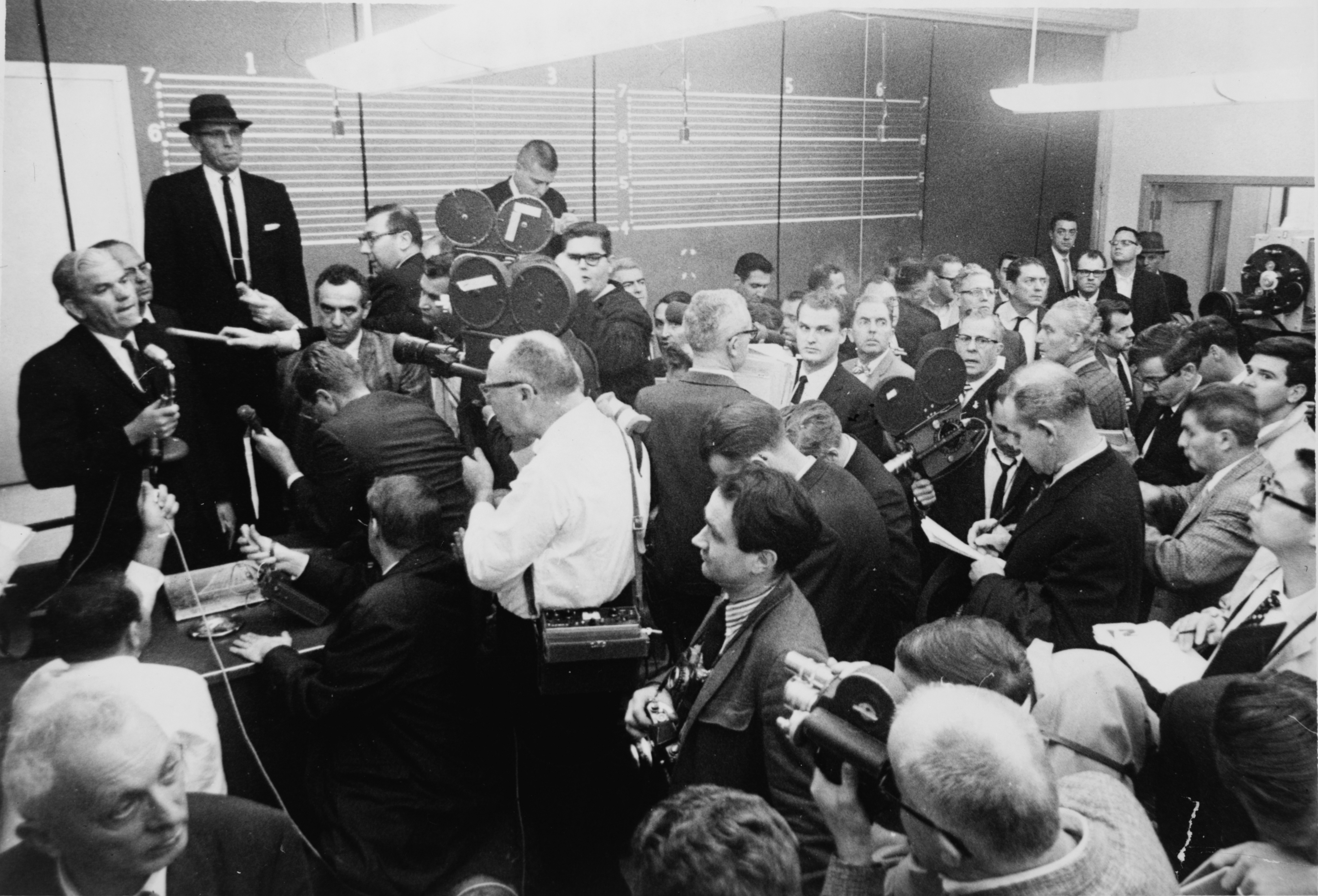
Wade conducting a press conference, November 25, 1963

On November 22, 1963, President John F. Kennedy was assassinated in downtown Dallas, just blocks from Wade's office in the Dallas County Courthouse.

Wade lost the opportunity to try Lee Harvey Oswald for the assassination of Kennedy and the murder of Police Officer J.D. Tippit when Dallas nightclub operator Jack Ruby murdered Oswald two days later; Wade became known nationally for prosecuting Ruby for Oswald's murder. Wade closely supervised the Ruby trial, but he appointed his assistant, William Alexander, to conduct the courtroom proceedings.

Wade and Alexander confronted Ruby's lawyers, famed trial lawyer Melvin Belli and Texas counsellor Joe Tonahill, in a lengthy trial that concluded on March 14, 1964, with a verdict for Ruby of "guilty of murder with malice." The jury had deliberated for less than three hours before arriving at its decision, and it recommended a death penalty.

In 1967, Wade participated, along with Hugh Aynesworth, in the making of "Countdown in Dallas" in 1967, an unmade documentary film, intended to bolster the image of Dallas.

=== Roe v. Wade ===
Wade, as Dallas County district attorney, was the named defendant when attorneys Sarah Weddington and Linda Coffee mounted a 1970 constitutional challenge to the Texas criminal statutes prohibiting doctors from performing abortions. Norma McCorvey ("Jane Roe"), a single woman, was signed up as the representative plaintiff. The challenge sought both a declaratory judgment that the Texas criminal abortion statutes were unconstitutional on their face, and an injunction restraining the defendant from enforcing the statutes. The lower court refused to grant Roe's desired injunction, but declared the criminal abortion statutes were void.

Both sides cross-appealed. The case worked its way through the appellate process, culminating in the Supreme Court's landmark 1973 Roe v. Wade decision that made all first trimester abortions legal throughout the United States.

== Later life and death ==
Despite the loss of Roe v. Wade and its unpopularity with conservative voters, Wade himself was not blamed, and his political career did not suffer. He continued to serve in office for an additional 14 years, and he remained a fixture around the new Crowley Courts Building, where members of the Dallas Bar called him "the Chief". In 1995, the Henry Wade Juvenile Justice Center was named in his honor, and in 2000, Texas Lawyer magazine named him as one of the 102 most influential lawyers of the 20th century. Wade died on March 1, 2001 from Parkinson's disease at the age of 86.

== Legacy ==
Wade once again gained national attention in 1988 with the release of Errol Morris' documentary film The Thin Blue Line. The documentary tells the story of Randall Dale Adams' 1977 conviction for the murder of Robert Wood, a Dallas police officer. Adams was sentenced to death for the crime. The execution was scheduled for May 8, 1979, but US Supreme Court Justice Lewis F. Powell, Jr., ordered a stay only three days before the scheduled date. Instead of conducting a new trial, Governor Bill Clements commuted Adams's sentence to life in prison. Adams was exonerated in 1988, after serving 12 years in prison. Similar cases of exonerated men have recently arisen, putting the legality of Wade's practices in question.

In a January 1964 Dallas Times Herald, Wade's wife was quoted: "I’d be afraid to drink a glass of light wine and then drive to the drugstore...If the police stopped me, I know what Henry would do." Several articles later noted that a 1963 internal memo in Wade's office advised against, "Jews, Negroes, Dagos, Mexicans or a member of any minority race" from serving on a jury. In 1969, Jon Sparling, one of Wade's top assistants, wrote a training manual warning against picking, among others, "free-thinkers" and "extremely overweight people," and said, "You are not looking for a fair juror but rather a strong, biased and sometimes hypocritical individual who believes that defendants are different from them."

As of July 2008, 15 persons convicted during Wade's term as Dallas County district attorney have been exonerated of the crimes of which they were convicted in light of new DNA evidence. Because of the culture of the department to "convict at all costs," more innocent people are suspected to have been falsely imprisoned. Project Innocence Texas has more than 250 cases under examination.

Craig Watkins, the first black American DA for Dallas County, described Wade's tenure as having "a cowboy kind of mentality and the reality is that kind of approach is archaic, racist, elitist and arrogant." In Wade’s final year in office, the U.S. Supreme Court overturned the death sentence of a black man, Thomas Miller-El, ruling that blacks were excluded from the jury. Cited in Miller-El’s appeal was a manual for prosecutors that Wade wrote in 1969 and was used for more than a decade. It gave instructions on how to keep minorities off juries. Before Wade's death, DNA evidence was used for the first time to reverse a Dallas County conviction; David Shawn Pope, found guilty of rape in 1986, had spent 15 years in prison. Watkins said in a 2010 interview in The Guardian that officers from his own jurisdiction "were taken aback because we were calling in to question the work they had done for all these years. It was the same among some folks in this office. They were afraid of the consequences of this Pandora's box being opened." Lenell Geter, a black engineer, was convicted of armed robbery and sentenced to life in prison. After Geter had spent more than a year behind bars, Wade agreed to a new trial, then dropped the charges in 1983 amid reports of shoddy evidence and allegations Geter was singled out because of his race.

According to a 2016 article, Wade was responsible for the controversial conviction and execution of a Black man, Tommy Lee Walker. In 2026, the Dallas County Commissioners Court symbolically exonerated Walker, albeit the decision is not legally binding. One commissioner stated, "Tommy Lee Walker was not killed. He was murdered."

At Walker's trial, two witnesses had testified that they saw a black man at the scene of the murder just minutes before it was committed. However, there was no physical evidence linking Walker to the murder. In addition, Walker's underaged girlfriend, 14-year-old Mary Louise Smith, whom he impregnated when he was 18 and she was 13, testified that he was with her on the night of the murder since she was giving birth. Under state law, Walker would've been guilty of statutory rape, which was a capital offense at the time. However, Walker was never charged with statutory rape and only stood trial for murder. It is also unclear whether Wade ever used it as an argument to discredit the witnesses, who were aware of the illegal relationship, albeit he attacked discrepancies in their testimony.

Former Dallas assistant district attorney Edward Gray wrote the 2010 book Henry Wade's Tough Justice which discussed the miscarriages of justice during Wade's tenure, noting that Wade's office conviction rate of innocent defendants was ten times the national average. Gray stated that "Henry Wade wouldn't intentionally try to convict someone he knew to be innocent...but even in cases where evidence was weak, he would go all out, go for broke, be super-competitive."

Wade considered himself a segregationist, and expressed dislike for female jurors, even stating "it is possible that their “women’s intuition” can help you if you can’t win your case with the facts." He added that "Young women too often sympathize with the Defendant; old women wearing too much make-up are usually unstable, and therefore are bad State’s jurors" and suggested "try to keep the ratio at least seven to five in favor of men.". Wade did not look favorably on overweight jurors either, as it suggests a lack of self-discipline. Instead, he stated his preference for "the lean and hungry look".

Following increase in discussion of the topic, Dr. Michael Phillips, Dr. Rick Halperin and Hadi Jawad of the Dallas Observer stated that it was advisable for Wade’s name to be removed from the center.
