= Allen Estrin =

American screenwriter (born 1954)

- Born: June 20, 1954 (age 71)
- Occupations: Screenwriter, producer, director, author
- Known for: Co-founder of PragerU; Producer of the Dennis Prager Show
- Works: Pocahontas II: Journey to a New World; Bare Essentials; Warm Hearts, Cold Feet; For Goodness Sake; For Goodness Sake II; The Hollywood Professionals, Volume 6: Capra, Cukor and Brown; Heaven's Witness
- Spouse: Susan
- Website: Allen Estrin, PragerU

Allen Estrin (born June 20, 1954) is an American screenwriter, producer, director, and author. He is known for screenwriting with his late brother Mark Estrin, co-writing a novel with Joseph Telushkin, and his current work with Dennis Prager. With Prager he co-founded PragerU and serves as the executive producer of the Dennis Prager Show.

== Career ==
Estrin co-founded the digital media website PragerU, short for "Prager University", with Dennis Prager and is currently the executive producer of The Dennis Prager Show.

When Estrin originally conceptualized PragerU, he had planned for it to be a brick-and-mortar university, but later proposed instead creating short educational videos online. Estrin credits Jeremy Boreing with helping to develop its current animation style. Estrin represented PragerU at President Donald Trump's "Social Media Summit" in July 2019. He predicts that leftists will eventually create their equivalent of PragerU.

Estrin was a screenwriter for several television shows including Boston Public, Touched by an Angel, and The Practice.

He also co-wrote Pocahontas II: Journey to a New World and with his brother Mark Estrin (1947-2005) wrote Bare Essentials, and Warm Hearts, Cold Feet. He was also a co-producer for Bare Essentials. With Prager, David Zucker, and Susan Silverberg Grossand he wrote For Goodness Sake. He and Prager wrote a sequel, For Goodness Sake II. Estrin is a lecturer in screenwriting at the American Film Institute. He directed "Israel in a Time of Terror".

=== Books ===
Estrin wrote The Hollywood Professionals, Volume 6: Capra, Cukor and Brown, published in 1980, about directors Frank Capra, George Cukor, and Clarence Brown.

With Joseph Telushkin, Estrin also co-wrote the novel Heaven's Witness, published in 2004. Publishers Weekly offered a mostly positive review, saying "Detailed backstories, plus numerous psychoanalytical and New Age tidbits, slow the plot in places, but the past-life angle sustains interest." The Washington Examiner praised the book as "the most interesting of this year's religious mysteries." Kirkus Reviews said it was "especially good at balancing belief and skepticism about reincarnation." And the Jewish Journal called the book "a page-turning whodunit" that "raises some lofty questions about the nature of the afterlife and what happens to us after we die." CBS optioned this book for a 2005 TV movie, paid both authors to write the script, but then stopped making such movies.

Estrin is the editor of "The Honest Book of Presidents: The Men Who Shaped America", which released in 2025.

== Personal life ==
Estrin married Susan Chamberlain in 1985. He is the son of Donald and Mildred Estrin, with brothers Joel and Mark, and a sister Amy.

In 2002, Estrin was denied life insurance because he traveled to Israel, one of the countries subject to U.S. State Department travel advisories. Because of this, he sued 14 insurance companies. This led to some insurers changing such policies, and to a bill in California to outlaw such travel restrictions on policies.
