= Arlene Agus =

American writer (1949–2024)

- Born: March 17, 1949; New York City, U.S.
- Died: December 2024 (aged 75)
- Education: Yeshivah of Flatbush; Brooklyn College

Arlene Agus (March 17, 1949 – December 2024) was an American Orthodox Jewish feminist and writer. She was "an early advocate of Orthodox feminism [and] a prominent advocate for Soviet Jewry," and was perhaps best known for reviving women's observance of Rosh Chodesh.

== Early life and education ==
Agus was born in Brooklyn, New York City. Her family "traced its lineage to the 10th and 11th centuries as direct descendants of Rashi". She was introduced to Jewish ritual music at a young age, as her father worked part-time as a hazzan. Agus also became aware of the differences in the treatment of women and men at a young age. At age six, she confronted her rabbi after he chose her male cousin, "who could not carry a tune," over her to lead the closing song.

She attended the Modern Orthodox Yeshivah of Flatbush, where she led an unsuccessful protest after Talmud study was removed from the girls' curriculum. She also later noted that she felt her education did not properly explain to her Jewish women's religious duties or Jewish women's history. This experience informed her later activism, and her belief in the importance of girls receiving a proper Jewish education. She attended Brooklyn College, where she majored in Celtic studies. After graduating, she moved to the Upper West Side in Manhattan. She later undertook graduate work in music therapy.

== Career ==
Agus' professional career was in special education. She worked as "a Jewish education specialist at New York’s Jewish Child Care Association and a member of the faculty of the Skirball Center for Adult Jewish Learning at Temple Emanu-El". By the 1980s, she worked as a non-profit consultant and had worked with Cardozo Law School at Yeshiva University and the Federation of Jewish Philanthropies at New York.

== Jewish feminism ==
Agus considered herself a "temperate feminist" interested in "communal unity," but was deemed radical by some community members. She viewed Judaism as inherently feminist, although this element could not be fully realized until after the women's egalitarian movement.In 1971, Agus co-founded Ezrat Nashim, "the first American Jewish feminist organization". Ezrat Nashim protested at the 1972 Conservative rabbis' conference, where their demands included:

- Women being allowed synagogue membership
- Women counting towards a minyan
- Women being "considered as bound to fulfill all mitzvot equally with men"
- Full participation in religious observances
- Women being able to act as witnesses in religious courts
- Women being allowed to initiate divorce
- Women being "permitted and encouraged to attend rabbinical and cantorial schools"

The involved women, including Agus, also fashioned their own tallitot. In 1973, she encouraged Blue Greenberg to deliver the keynote address at the First National Jewish Women's Conference. The same year, she founded a women's kollel. In 1982, she successfully negotiated a divorce for an agunah, a Jewish woman stuck in her marriage because her husband refused to allow her a divorce.

Agus remarked in 1984 that she would have been a rabbi if Orthodox law had allowed it, and that "It's only because I refuse to be denominationally limited that I'm not going to rabbinical school at the [Conservative] Jewish Theological Seminary". Instead, she learned and then taught Torah cantillation at Ansche Chesed, a Manhattan synagogue that, at the time, did not adhere to a specific stream of Judaism. Also at Ansche Chesed, she founded Minyan M'at, "an egalitarian service".

Among Agus's other feminist projects included co-founding the "first all-women's tefillot," and the creation of "egalitarian ceremonies for births, bar and bat mitzvahs, and weddings and commitment ceremonies," and tkhines. Agus also developed other Jewish rituals, such as a ceremony "to expiate the guilt of grown children mourning their parents," inspired by a friend's experiences of guilt following her mother's death.

=== Rosh Chodesh observance ===
In 1971, Agus led "a small group of women in a revival of the ritual as a creative women’s celebration". She wrote an article about the observance in 1976, titled "This Month Is for You: Observing Rosh Hodesh as a Woman’s Holiday", which sparked more widespread adoption.

== Soviet Jewry activism ==
While at Brooklyn College, Agus led the borough chapter of Student Struggle for Soviet Jewry. She later worked at the Greater New York Conference on Soviet Jewry. Agus felt the issue of Soviet Jewry helped to not only unite Jews, but also helped foster Jewish connections with non-Jewish activists. Agus continued her activism after graduating; in 1980, she coordinated Solidarity Day, an event held in New York City which called "for the release of Jews unable to emigrate under the Soviet regime".

== Later life and death ==
Agus became estranged from her friends and family in her later life. Her body was found in her apartment in December 2024. She was 75.
