= Joshua Prager (writer) =

American journalist and author (born 1971)

- Born: Joshua Harris Prager; Eagle Butte, South Dakota, U.S.
- Education: Ramaz School; Columbia University (BA)
- Occupations: Author, journalist
- Parent: Kenneth Prager (father)
- Relatives: Dennis Prager (uncle)
- Writing career
- Notable works: The Echoing Green, The Family Roe: An American Story
- Prager's voice

Joshua Harris Prager (born 1971) is an American journalist and author.

== Early life ==
Joshua Harris Prager was born into a Jewish family in Eagle Butte, South Dakota. Prager is the son of Columbia University physician and medical ethics expert Kenneth Prager, and the nephew of commentator Dennis Prager. He attended the Moriah School in Englewood, New Jersey, the Ramaz High School in Manhattan, and Columbia College, where he studied music theory, graduating in 1994.

== Literary career ==
Prager often writes of historical secrets. He found the reclusive heir of Margaret Wise Brown, author of the classic children's book Goodnight Moon. He confirmed the decades-long rumor that the New York Giants had stolen signs en route to the 1951 pennant. He revealed that baseball pitcher Ralph Branca (pitcher in the aforementioned baseball game) was born to a Jewish mother. He named the only anonymous winner in the history of the Pulitzer Prizes, the Iranian photographer Jahangir Razmi. He revealed the suicides of the parents of Swedish humanitarian Raoul Wallenberg. He identified the anonymous patron in the famous book Joe Gould's Secret. He identified Shelley Lynn Thornton as the unknown child of the plaintiff Jane Roe (Norma McCorvey), whose conception in 1969 led to the landmark case Roe v. Wade. He revealed the unknown story of law professor Warren Seavey who admitted to Harvard Law School World War II veterans who didn’t apply to the school or had questionable credentials. He revealed the unknown story and suicide of gymnast George Eyser who won six medals in the 1904 Olympics despite a wooden leg.

Prager has written for publications including Vanity Fair, The New York Times, and The Wall Street Journal, where he was a senior writer for eight years. His first book, The Echoing Green: The Untold Story of Bobby Thomson, Ralph Branca and the Shot Heard Round the World, is about the Shot Heard 'Round the World, which occurred during a famous 1951 baseball playoff game between the Brooklyn Dodgers and the New York Giants.. His second book, Half Life: Reflections from Jerusalem on a Broken Neck is about the road accident in Israel that left him paralyzed. He describes his rehabilitation and recovery from the accident; how he tracked down his fellow passengers and the widow of the bus driver who was killed in the accident; and his meeting with the truck driver, who rambled on about his own suffering and expressed no remorse for his actions.

In 2016, Prager published 100 Years: Wisdom From Famous Writers on Every Year of Your Life, a book of quotations designed by Milton Glaser.

Prager's fourth book, The Family Roe: An American Story, was published in 2021. It tells the story of Roe v. Wade and its plaintiff, Jane Roe (Norma McCorvey). The book was a finalist for the 2022 Pulitzer Prize for General Nonfiction, as well as the 2021 National Book Critics Circle Award for Nonfiction.

Prager has lectured at venues including TED and Google, and has received fellowships from the Nieman Foundation for Journalism as well as the Fulbright Program.

== Personal life ==
In May 1990, Prager was paralyzed in a road accident in Israel when a truck driver rammed into the minibus in which he was riding. Prager is married and has two daughters.

== Selected works ==
- Prager, Joshua (2021). The Family Roe: An American Story. W. W. Norton & Company. ISBN 978-0-393-24772-5.
