= Shelley Lynn Thornton =

American woman, the baby in Roe v. Wade (born 1970)

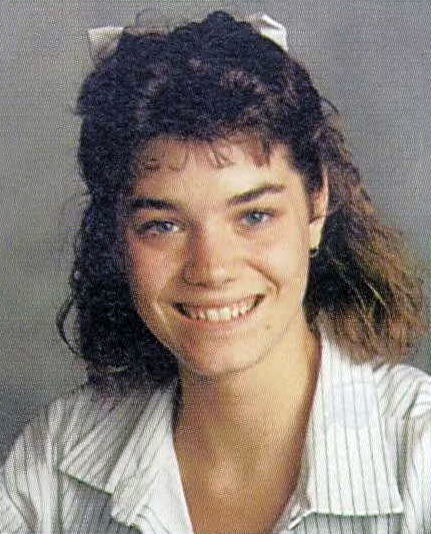
- Thornton's high school yearbook photo from 1988
- Born: June 2, 1970 (age 56); Dallas, Texas, U.S.
- Known for: Baby in Roe v. Wade case
- Spouse: Doug (m. 1991)
- Children: 3
- Parent: Norma McCorvey (biological mother)

Shelley Lynn Thornton (born June 2, 1970) is the biological daughter of Norma McCorvey. Also referred to as the "Roe baby", Thornton was the child resulting from the pregnancy at the center of the 1973 U.S. Supreme Court decision Roe v. Wade. She was not aware of her relationship to the court case until 1989 when she was 19 years old, and her identity was not publicly known until 2021.

== Life ==
Shelley Lynn Thornton was born to Norma McCorvey on June 2, 1970, at the Dallas Osteopathic Hospital, three months after McCorvey's lawyers filed the Roe v. Wade lawsuit.

At only three days old, she was adopted by then-engaged Texas residents Ruth Schmidt and Billy Thornton, who were later married. She was two-and-a-half years old when the Roe v. Wade Supreme Court ruling was issued. Her parents were open with her that she had been adopted, but they themselves did not know of her relationship to the famous Supreme Court case. She graduated from Highline High School in 1988 and entered secretarial school. Her birth mother first made contact with her in 1989 when she was a teenager living near Seattle.

Thornton married her boyfriend Doug of Albuquerque, New Mexico, in March 1991; they had a son born later that year, and then two daughters in 1999 and 2000. The family moved to Tucson, Arizona, for Doug's job. Thornton met her biological half-sisters, McCorvey's other two daughters, in March 2013; but although Thornton and McCorvey had several telephone conversations, they never actually met in person. Thornton said in 2021 that she has no regrets over not ever having met her biological mother.

Thornton's identity as the "Roe baby" was publicly revealed in 2021 with the release of Joshua Prager's book, The Family Roe: An American Story.

== Discovery of Roe v. Wade connection ==
Thornton was McCorvey's third child. Although McCorvey had wanted to have an abortion, it was prohibited by the laws in Texas. McCorvey eventually brought, and won, a lawsuit, securing a right for women to obtain abortions in the United States that remained recognized for nearly 50 years – until the decision was overturned in 2022.

Despite McCorvey's desire at the time to have an abortion, she instead obeyed the Texas law, giving birth and releasing her baby for adoption before Roe v. Wade was ruled. McCorvey's baby was given the name Shelley Lynn Thornton by her adoptive parents, and Thornton was two-and-a-half years old when the Supreme Court case was decided.

Many years later, after Thornton learned of her identity as the "Roe baby", she engaged in telephone conversations with McCorvey, who, according to Thornton, told her that she was placed for adoption because McCorvey "knew [that she] couldn't take care of [me]." Thornton said that when she asked McCorvey about her biological father, McCorvey told her that his first name was Bill and described what he looked like. Thornton also learned about her two older half-sisters from McCorvey – Melissa and Jennifer.

In a 2021 interview, Thornton stated that she was neither pro-choice nor pro-life. She grew up not knowing that she was the baby in the Roe case until her birth mother appeared on the Today show in 1989 and talked about her desire to meet her daughter. In response, a journalist for the National Enquirer found the teenaged Thornton and told her about her prenatal history, which made her sad.

In 1991, Thornton became pregnant and did not have an abortion, later saying that abortion was "not part of who I was". By 2021, she had met her two half-siblings but not her birth mother. She nearly met her birth mother in 1994. According to Thornton, McCorvey told her on the phone that she should have thanked her for not having an abortion. Thornton's reaction was "What! I'm supposed to thank you for getting knocked up ... and then giving me away?" She told her birth mother that she "would never, ever thank her for not aborting me". She reflected, "When someone's pregnant with a baby, and they don't want that baby, that person develops knowing they're not wanted."

== Reaction to the decision overturning Roe ==
Following the 2022 U.S. Supreme Court decision that overturned Roe, Thornton released a statement speaking out against the decision. In her statement, Thornton said that she worries the Dobbs ruling could foreshadow future turmoil, saying that "too many times has a woman's choice, voice, and individual freedom been decided for her by others. Being that I am bound to the center of Roe v. Wade, I have a unique perspective on this matter." She added, "I believe that the decision to have an abortion is a private, medical choice that should be between a woman, her family, and her doctor. We have lived in times of uncertainty and insecurity before, but to have such a fundamental right taken away and this ruling be overturned concerns me of what lies ahead."
