= The Family Roe: An American Story =

2021 nonfiction book

- First edition
- Author: Joshua Prager
- Language: English
- Genre: Nonfiction; biography
- Published: September 14, 2021 (W. W. Norton & Company)
- Publication place: United States
- Pages: 672 pages (Hardcover edition)
- ISBN: 978-0-393-24772-5

The Family Roe: An American Story is a 2021 book written by Joshua Prager. The book is a biographical account of Norma McCorvey, known as "Jane Roe" in the 1973 landmark U.S. Supreme Court decision Roe v. Wade. The Roe case, which established a woman's constitutional right to an abortion that persisted for nearly fifty years before being overturned in 2022, is one of the most controversial opinions in American jurisprudence. The Family Roe was a finalist for the 2022 Pulitzer Prize for General Nonfiction.

== Recognition ==
- Finalist for the 2022 Pulitzer Prize for General Nonfiction
- Finalist for the 2022 J. Anthony Lukas Book Prize
- Finalist for the 2021 National Book Critics Circle Award for Nonfiction
- NPR's Best Books of 2021
- The New York Times Notable Book of 2021
- Time magazine's 100 Must-Read Books of 2021

== See also ==
- Dobbs v. Jackson Women's Health Organization
- Shelley Lynn Thornton
