= For Goodness Sake (film) =

1993 film by David Zucker

- Directed by: David Zucker
- Written by: Allen Estrin; Dennis Prager; Susan Silverberg; David Zucker
- Produced by: Rich Markey
- Edited by: Michael L. Sale
- Release date: 1993
- Running time: approximately 29 minutes
- Country: United States
- Language: English

For Goodness Sake is a short comedy film made in 1992, hosted by its co-writer, radio talk show host Dennis Prager. Released in 1993, the film contains comical vignettes that address everyday ethical issues. Mentor Media Inc. marketed the film for ethics training to government departments, including the FBI, Department of Defense, and IRS, as well as hospitals, schools, and hundreds of major corporations.

It included appearances from actors Jason Alexander, Steve Allen, Scott Bakula, Faith Ford, Florence Henderson, Jason Hervey, Bonnie Hunt, Eugene Levy, Jayne Meadows, Bob Saget, Julia Sweeney, and Cindy Williams. The film originally included a scene with O. J. Simpson and Kim Coles, but that scene was edited out of the movie after Simpson was charged with murder.

== Sequel ==
A sequel, For Goodness Sake II, was produced by Rich Markey and released in 1996. It was written by Dennis Prager and Allen Estrin, and co-hosted by talk show hosts Dennis Prager and Larry Elder. The future co-creators of South Park, Trey Parker and Matt Stone, were the film's director and 1st assistant director, respectively, and also had small parts in the film. The "fine, just fine" line that they used in their segment was later used during the South Park episode "Jakovasaurs".
