= Lawrence Hajioff =

British-American rabbi, educator, and author

- Born: London, England
- Education: University of Manchester; Ohr Somayach
- Occupations: Rabbi, educator, writer
- Employer: Stern College for Women
- Spouse: Anita Hajiof
- Children: 5

Lawrence Hajioff is a British-American rabbi, educator, and writer. He is on the Judaic studies faculty of the Stern College for Women at Yeshiva University and is also the assistant director of Admissions. Hajioff served as the official rabbi for Birthright Israel in Manhattan, New York. Hajioff is also the author of three books: Jew Got Questions? (2014), Will Jew Marry Me?: A Guide to Dating, Relationships, Love and Marriage (2016), and The Future: A Guide to the Jewish Messiah, Israel, and The End of Days (2018).

== Early life and education ==
Hajioff grew up in London, England. After graduating with honors in political science from University of Manchester, he worked for MTV in news production and won a national competition to become "Jewish Stand-Up Comedian of the Year." After deciding to pursue a career as a rabbi, Hajioff studied in Israel and then Monsey, New York, where he received his rabbinical smicha ordination from Yeshiva Ohr Somayach.

== Career ==
In the late 1990s, Hajioff began working in New York City as a counselor for Jewish Alcoholics, Chemical Dependents and Significant Others (JACS), a program to help Jewish drug addicts. In 2001, Hajioff was one of the founding counselors of a pilot program launched in Ramapo, New York to help religious Jewish youth recover from drug and alcohol abuse. In 2004, he received an award from the town of Ramapo for his counseling work.

In 2005, Hajioff joined the faculty of Stern College for Women at Yeshiva University. In 2006 he received the "Professor of the Year" award in Judaic Studies at Stern. He currently serves on the Judaic studies faculty of the college, where he teaches courses on Jewish thought, the Jewish holidays, the Sabbath, and Jewish mysticism. Hajioff also serves as the assistant director of Undergraduate Admissions at the school.

Hajioff also served as the official rabbi and educational director for Birthright Israel in Manhattan and its affiliated Jewish Enrichment Center (JEC). In this role, he has regularly led trips to Israel and run programs and classes at the JEC, including one that gives a bar or bat mitzvah to adults who never had one.

Hajioff is on the speakers' bureau of the Orthodox Union and Yeshiva University. He is also a "Visiting Scribe" at the Jewish Book Council.

== Writings ==
Hajioff is the author of three books:

- Jew Got Questions?. Sapir Press. 2014. ISBN 978-1598260649.
- Will Jew Marry Me?: A Guide to Dating, Relationships, Love and Marriage. Golden Waters Publishing. 2016. ISBN 978-0997451535.
- The Future: A Guide to the Jewish Messiah, Israel, and The End of Days. Mosaica Press. 2018. ISBN 978-1946351258.

== Personal life ==
Hajioff lives in Wesley Hills in Rockland County, New York with his wife Anita and their five children.
