= Joseph Telushkin =

American Jewish rabbi

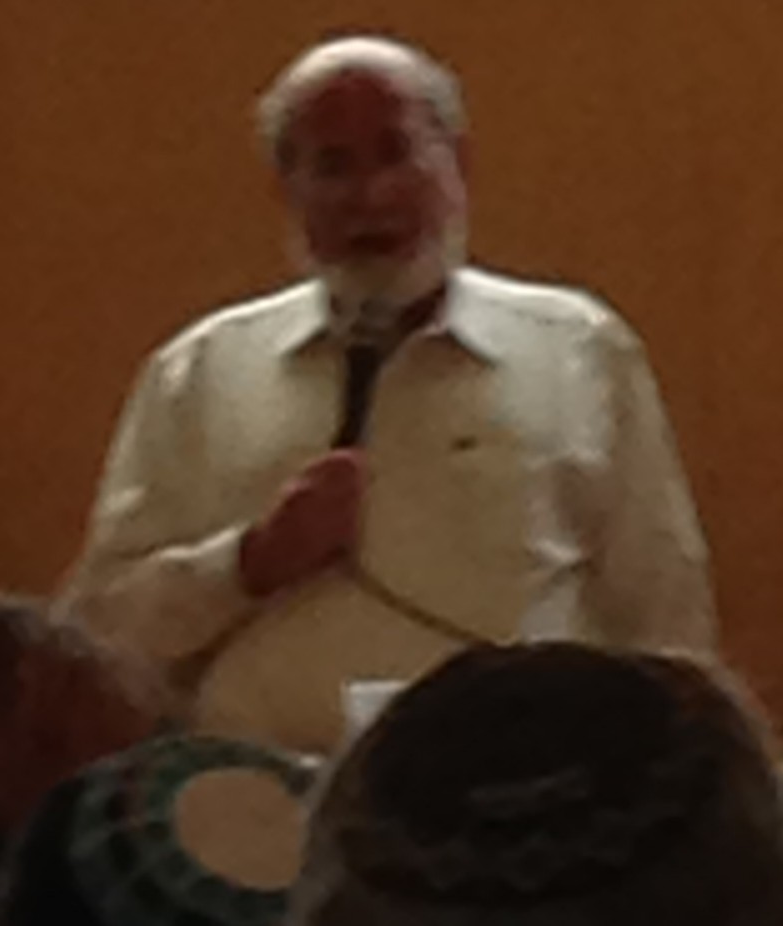
- Born: 1948 (age 77–78)
- Occupations: Rabbi, writer, lecturer
- Writing career
- Genres: Judaism, ethics

Joseph Telushkin (born 1948) is an American rabbi and writer. He has authored more than 15 books, including volumes about Jewish ethics, Jewish literacy, as well as the book Rebbe, a New York Times bestseller released in June 2014.

== Life and career ==
Telushkin was raised in Brooklyn, New York, the son of Solomon and Hellen Telushkin. He attended Yeshiva of Flatbush, where he met his friend and future co-author for two books, Dennis Prager, in tenth grade. While at Columbia University, he studied Jewish history and authored Nine Questions People Ask About Judaism and Why the Jews?: The Reason for Antisemitism.

At university, Telushkin was an active leader of the Student Struggle for Soviet Jewry. As part of his position, Telushkin visited the Soviet Union, where he met with dissidents such as Andrei Sakharov. He was eventually listed by the KGB as an anti-Russian agent.

An Orthodox rabbi by training, Telushkin served until its closure in December 2022 as Rabbi of the Los Angeles Synagogue for the Performing Arts, founded in 1972 by Rabbi Jerome Cutler. He is an associate of the National Jewish Center for Learning and Leadership and a former director of education at the non-denominational Brandeis-Bardin Institute. Telushkin is also a Senior Associate with CLAL and is a member of the board of directors of the Jewish Book Council. He has been on the Newsweek list of the 50 most influential rabbis in America since 1997.

Telushkin is the author of 16 books on Judaism. His book Words That Hurt, Words That Heal inspired Senators Joseph Lieberman’s and Connie Mack’s Senate Resolution #151 to establish a National Speak No Evil Day in the US, a day for which Americans would go for twenty-four hours without saying anything unkind or unfair about, or to, anyone. His book Jewish Literacy: The Most Important Things to Know About the Jewish Religion, Its People and Its History was one of the best-selling books on Judaism of the 1990s and early 2000s. More than two decades after its publication, the book remains a foundation text for Jews, non-Jews, and prospective converts alike. The first volume of A Code of Jewish Ethics: You Shall Be Holy, which Telushkin regards as his major life's work, was published in 2006. It won the National Jewish Book Award for Jewish Book of the Year. The second volume, A Code of Jewish Ethics: Love Your Neighbor, was released in 2009.

In 2013, Telushkin was invited by the United Nations High Commissioner for Refugees, António Guterres, to speak before the commission in Geneva.

In 2014, Telushkin released Rebbe, which appeared on the bestseller lists of New York Times Best Seller list, Wall Street Journal, and Publishers Weekly.

Telushkin tours the United States as a lecturer on Jewish topics, and he has been named by Talk Magazine as one of the 50 best speakers in the United States. He wrote the episode 'Bar Mitzvah' on Touched by an Angel, guest-starring Kirk Douglas.

== Works ==
- A Code of Jewish Ethics: Volume 1: You Shall Be Holy
- A Code of Jewish Ethics: Volume 2: Love Your Neighbor As Yourself
- Jewish Literacy: The Most Important Things to Know About the Jewish Religion, Its People and Its History
- The Book of Jewish Values: A Day-by-Day Guide to Ethical Living
- Words that Hurt, Words that Heal: How to Use Words Wisely and Well
- Jewish Humor: What the Best Jewish Jokes Say About the Jews
- Biblical Literacy: The Most Important People, Events and Ideas of the Hebrew Bible
- Jewish Wisdom: Ethical, Spiritual and Historical Lessons from the Great Works and Thinkers (1994, Morrow/HarperCollins) ISBN 0-688-12958-7
- The Ten Commandments of Character: Essential Advice for Living an Honorable, Ethical, Honest Life
- Telushkin, Joseph (1987). Uncommon Sense: The World's Fullest Compendium of Wisdom. SP Books. ISBN 9780933503489.
- The Golden Land: The Story of Jewish Immigration to America
- Rabbi Daniel Winter mystery series, comprising:
  - The Unorthodox Murder of Rabbi Wahl (also published as The Unorthodox Murder of Rabbi Moss)
  - The Final Analysis of Dr. Stark
  - An Eye for an Eye
- Nine Questions People Ask About Judaism (with Dennis Prager)
- Why the Jews: The Reason for Antisemitism (with Dennis Prager)
- Heaven's Witness (with Allen Estrin)
- The Quarrel
- Prager, Dennis; Telushkin, Joseph (1975). Eight Questions People Ask about Judaism. (with Dennis Prager)
- Telushkin, Joseph (2010). Humor Żydowski.
- The Case for Jewish Peoplehood: Can We Be One?, by Erica Brown, Misha Galperin, and Joseph Telushkin, 2009
- Hillel: If Not Now, When?
- Rebbe: The life and teachings of Menachem M. Schneerson, the most influential Rabbi in Modern History (2014)
