= Sarah Weddington =

American lawyer and politician (1945–2021)

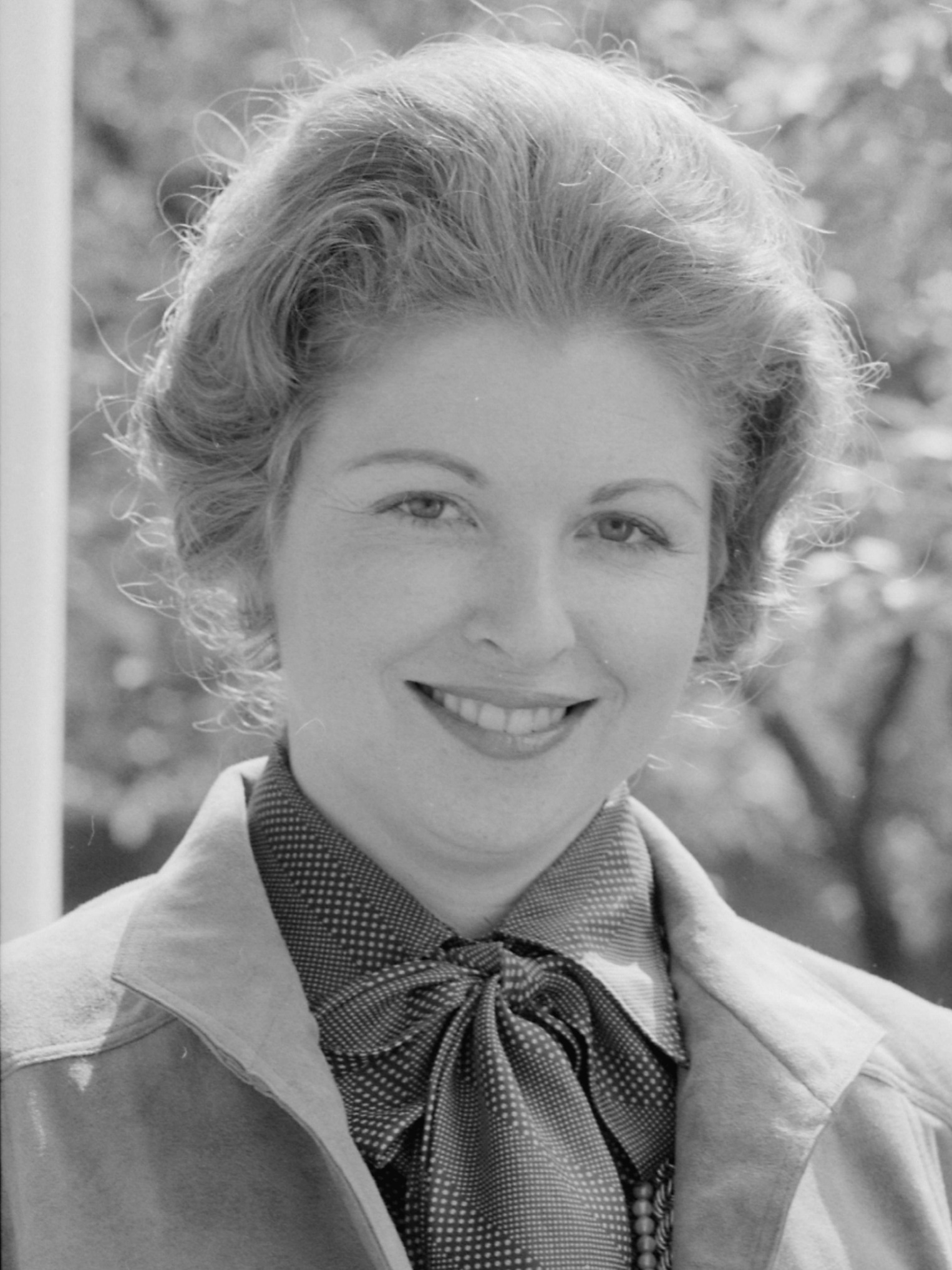
- Weddington in 1978

White House Director of Political Affairs
- In office August 10, 1979 – January 20, 1981
- President: Jimmy Carter
- Preceded by: Timothy Kraft
- Succeeded by: Lyn Nofziger

Member of the Texas House of Representatives from the 37-B district
- In office January 11, 1977 – September 1, 1977
- Preceded by: Constituency established
- Succeeded by: Mary Jane Bode

Member of the Texas House of Representatives from the 37-2 district
- In office January 9, 1973 – January 11, 1977
- Preceded by: Constituency established
- Succeeded by: Constituency abolished

Personal details
- Born: Sarah Catherine Ragle; February 5, 1945 Abilene, Texas, U.S.
- Died: December 26, 2021 (aged 76) Austin, Texas, U.S.
- Party: Democratic
- Spouse: Ron Weddington (m. 1968; div. 1974)
- Education: McMurry University (BA); University of Texas at Austin (JD)

Sarah Catherine Ragle Weddington (February 5, 1945 – December 26, 2021) was an American attorney, law professor, advocate for women's rights and reproductive health, and member of the Texas House of Representatives. She was best known for representing "Jane Roe" (real name Norma McCorvey) in the landmark Roe v. Wade case before the United States Supreme Court. She also was the first female General Counsel for the US Department of Agriculture.

== Early life and education ==
Sarah Ragle was born on February 5, 1945, in Abilene, Texas, to Lena Catherine and Herbert Doyle Ragle, a Methodist minister. As a child, she was drum major of her junior high band, president of the Methodist youth fellowship at her church, played the organ, sang in the church choir, and rode horses.

Weddington graduated from high school two years early and then graduated with a bachelor's degree in English from McMurry University in Abilene. She was a member of Sigma Kappa sorority. In 1964, she entered the University of Texas Law School, partly motivated after the dean at McMurry College told her "No woman from this college has ever gone to law school. It would be too tough". She was one of only five women in her law school class of 120. In 1967, during her third year of law school, Weddington became pregnant by Ron Weddington and travelled to Mexico for an illegal abortion, a fact she did not reveal until 1992. She received her J.D. that same year, graduating in the top quarter of her class.

== Career ==
After graduating, Weddington found it difficult to find a job with a law firm. She joined a group of graduate students at University of Texas-Austin who were researching ways to challenge various anti-abortion statutes. A 2025 documentary, Lone Star Three, explores how Weddington's involvement with this group directly led to her arguing in Roe v. Wade.

Soon after, a pregnant woman named Norma McCorvey visited a local attorney seeking an abortion. The attorney instead assisted McCorvey with handing over her child for adoption and after doing so, referred McCorvey to Weddington and Linda Coffee.

In March 1970, Weddington and her co-counsel filed suit against Henry Wade, the Dallas district attorney and the person responsible for enforcing the anti-abortion statute. McCorvey became the landmark plaintiff and was referred in the legal documents as "Jane Roe" to protect her identity.

In May 1970, Weddington first stated her case in front of a three-judge district court in Dallas. The district court agreed that the Texas abortion laws were unconstitutional, but the state appealed the decision, landing it before the United States Supreme Court. In 1971 and again in the fall of 1972, Weddington appeared before the Supreme Court. At the time of her first Supreme Court presentation, Weddington was 26 years old and had never tried a legal case. Her argument was based on the 1st, 4th, 5th, 8th, 9th, and 14th amendments, as well as the Court's previous decision in Griswold v. Connecticut, which legalized the sale of contraceptives based on the right of privacy. In January 1973, the Court's decision was ultimately handed down, overturning Texas’ abortion law by a 7-2 majority and legalizing abortion throughout the United States.

McCorvey, the lead plaintiff, claimed at the time that she had been raped, although she later recanted that claim and said she had wanted an abortion for economic reasons. During the course of the Roe v. Wade litigation, she gave birth and put the baby up for adoption. Rape was never an issue in the litigation or in the Supreme Court decision. In a 1993 speech at the Institute for Educational Ethics in Oklahoma, Weddington discussed how she presented McCorvey during the lawsuit: “My conduct may not have been totally ethical. But I did it for what I thought were good reasons." In a 2018 interview with Time, she said McCorvey was "a changeable person", adding "the problem I had was trying to tell when she was telling the truth and when she wasn't. ... I was very careful in drafting the materials that were filed with the court to be sure I only put in things I was sure were accurate."

In 1989, Weddington was portrayed by Amy Madigan in the television film Roe vs. Wade. In 1992, Weddington compiled her experiences with the case and interviews with the people involved into a book titled A Question of Choice.

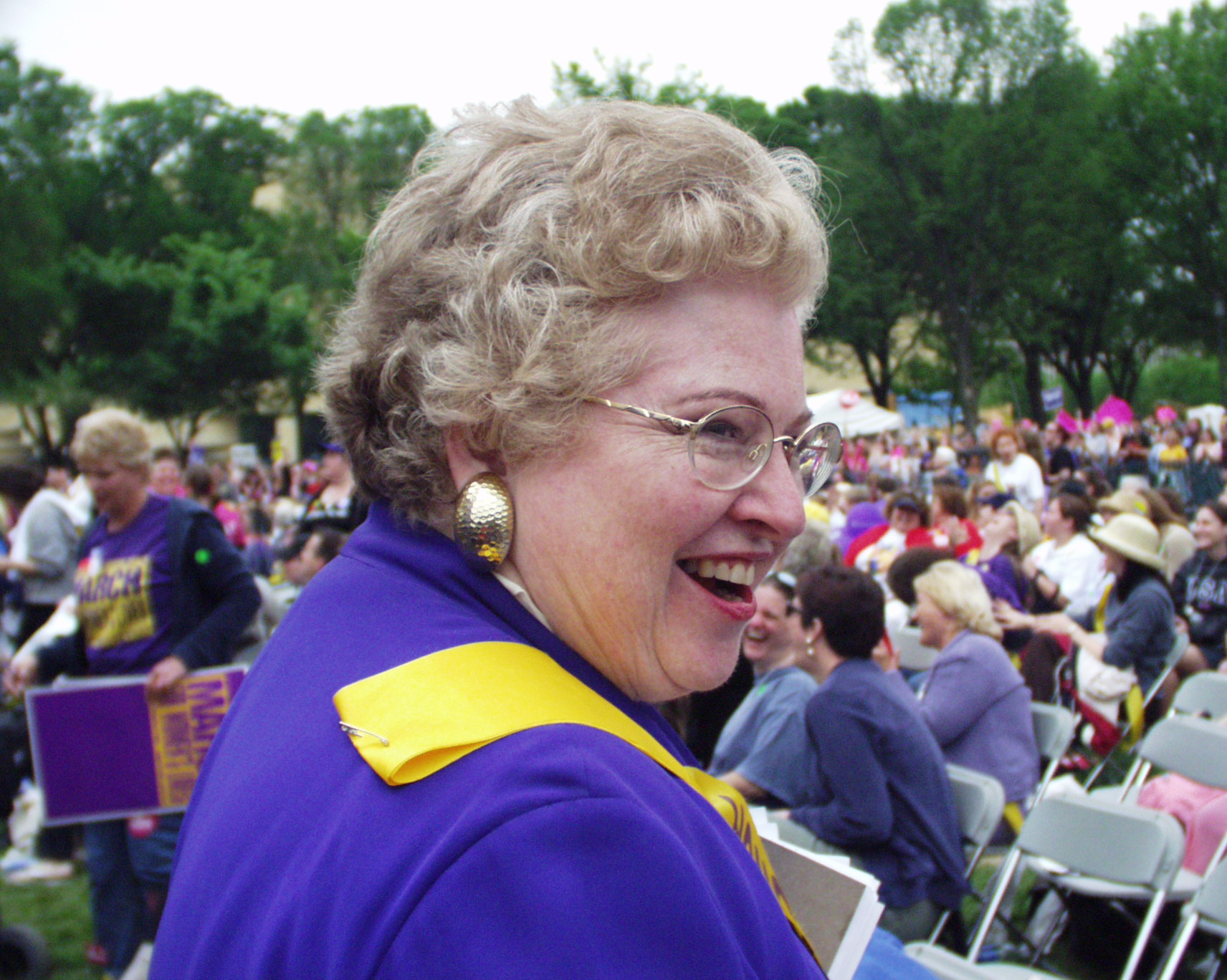
Weddington in Washington, D.C. in 2004

By the time Roe v. Wade was decided in January 1973, Weddington was elected to the Texas House of Representatives and re-elected to another two terms.

Weddington attended the historic 1977 National Women's Conference in Houston as a Texas delegate speaking on the resolution of women's reproductive freedom.

In 1977, US President Jimmy Carter's administration chose Weddington to serve in the United States Department of Agriculture, and from 1978 to 1981 she served as his assistant.

From 1981 to 1990 she was a lecturer at Texas Woman's University. She was the founder of the Weddington Center. She also served as a speaker and adjunct professor at the University of Texas at Austin until 2012.

In 2020, she was portrayed by actress Greer Grammer in the film Roe v. Wade, directed by Nick Loeb and Cathy Allyn.

== Personal life and death ==
From 1968 to 1974, she was married to Ron Weddington. After her divorce, Sarah lived alone in Austin, Texas.

Weddington died at her home in Austin on December 26, 2021, at age 76, after a period of declining health. News outlets noted that her death occurred shortly after the U.S. Supreme Court heard oral arguments in Dobbs v. Jackson Women's Health Organization, a case reconsidering – and ultimately overturning – the Roe v. Wade decision.

== Awards ==
Weddington held honorary doctorates from McMurry University, Hamilton College, Austin College, Southwestern University, and Nova Southeastern University.

== Publications ==
=== As author ===
- A Question of Choice, Smithmark Publishers, Incorporated, 1993, ISBN 978-0-8317-5334-4; Consortium Book Sales & Dist, 2013, ISBN 978-1-55861-812-1
- The United States Delegation to the United Nations Mid-Decade Conference for Women: Copenhagen, July 14–30, 1980. Washington, DC : The White House, 1980.
- Weddington, Sarah Ragle, and 1975 Homemakers Committee United States. National Commission on the Observance of International Women's Year. The Legal Status of Homemakers In Texas. Washington, D.C., Homemakers Committee, National Commission on the Observance of International Women's Year : for sale by the Supt. of Docs., U.S. Govt. Print. Off., 1977.
- Weddington, Sarah (March 31, 2003). "Getting the Right to Choose". Time. Archived from the original on December 7, 2010.

=== As contributing author ===
- Guide to Women's Resources. Washington, D.C: Office of Sarah Weddington, 1980.
- Honoring a Commitment to the People of America: The Record of President Jimmy Carter on Women's Issues. Washington, D.C: Office of Sarah Weddington, 1980.
- Roe, Jane, Henry Wade, Sarah R. Weddington, and Jay Floyd. Jane Roe, Et Al., Appellants V. Henry Wade, Appellee: proceedings of Arguments Before the U.s. Supreme Court Monday, December 13, 1971. Washington: U.S. Supreme Court, 1971.
- Weddington, Sarah R, Jane Hickie, Deanna Fitzgerald, Elizabeth W. Fernea, and Marilyn P. Duncan. Texas Women in Politics. Austin, Tex: Foundation for Women's Resources, 1977.

Political offices
Preceded by Timothy Kraft	White House Director of Political Affairs; 1979–1981	Succeeded by Lyn Nofziger
