= Ezra Labaton =

American philosopher

Rabbi Dr. Ezra R. Labaton
- Title: Rabbi Labaton

Personal life
- Born: Ronnie Labaton; July 21, 1950 Brooklyn, New York
- Died: December 4, 2013 (aged 63) Deal, NJ
- Buried: Staten Island, New York
- Spouse: Emily Labaton
- Children: Sara Labaton, Ovadia Labaton, Devorah Labaton, Mordechai Labaton
- Parent(s): Alfred Labaton and Doris Labaton
- Education: Yeshiva University, Brandeis University

Religious life
- Religion: Judaism
- Denomination: Orthodox
- Synagogue: Congregation Magen David of West Deal; Hillel Yeshiva
- Position: Rabbi

Ezra (Ronnie) Labaton (July 21, 1950 – December 4, 2013) was an American Modern Orthodox rabbi and Jewish philosopher. He was a descendant of the Sephardi Jews.

== Heritage ==
Ezra Ronnie Labaton was born on July 21, 1950, in Brooklyn. His ancestry was of Sephardic Jewry, specifically Syrian Jews. He grew up in the Syrian Jewish Community of New York.

== Early years and Education ==
Labaton was educated at Magen David Yeshiva, an elementary yeshiva, and Yeshiva of Flatbush High School. He attended Yeshiva University and Brandeis University.

During his years in Yeshiva University and throughout the rest of his life, Ezra was a student of Rabbi Joseph Soloveitchik ('the Rav').

== Philosophy and Works ==
=== Phd Thesis ===
The Rabbi's PhD Thesis, titled "A Comprehensive Analysis of Rabenu Abraham Maimuni’s Biblical Commentary" was submitted in 2012 to Brandeis University where he was awarded his PhD.

== Congregation Magen David of West Deal ==
Rabbi Labaton served as the head rabbi of Congregation Magen David of West Deal from 1982 until his death in 2013. He was the first full-time rabbi hired by the synagogue, which was founded by Joseph M. Betesh shortly before.

== Other affiliations ==
=== Rabbinical Councils ===
- Sephardic Rabbinical Council
- Halachic Organ Donor Society (HODS)
- Jersey Shore Orthodox Rabbinate (JSOR)

=== International ===
In 1975, while still a graduate student, Rabbi Ezra and his wife Emily Friedman went to South Africa, where they conducted seminars for Jewish children. In 1976, Rabbi Ezra and his wife worked to gather critical information on behalf of Soviet Jews in Russia.

== Illness ==
The Rabbi was diagnosed in 1999 with colon cancer. He would fight through many cycles of treatment and recurrence as the disease spread, before ultimately dying in 2013 of advanced lung cancer. In 2004, after recovering from his third recurrence, The Rabbi cited his illness and treatments as having helped him excel in the pastoral aspect of his role as Rabbi. He said it allowed him to empathize and share with other sick people, in a way that he never before was able to. As part of his recovery, the Rabbi became an avid runner, as he ran 5 miles each night, as often as 5 nights per week.

== Current news ==
A number of the Rabbi's students have set up and maintain RabbiLabaton.com, to help perpetuate his legacy through his teachings. The site contains hundreds of audio lectures, tributes, and other notes from his archives. They are also working to archive the contents of the Rabbi's personal library, which include thousands of titles of Jewish Academia, as well as his personal archives of speeches and lecture notes.

== Works ==
1. A Comprehensive Analysis of Rabenu Abraham Maimuni’s Biblical Commentary: A Dissertation
