= Norma McCorvey =

"Roe v. Wade" plaintiff (1947–2017)

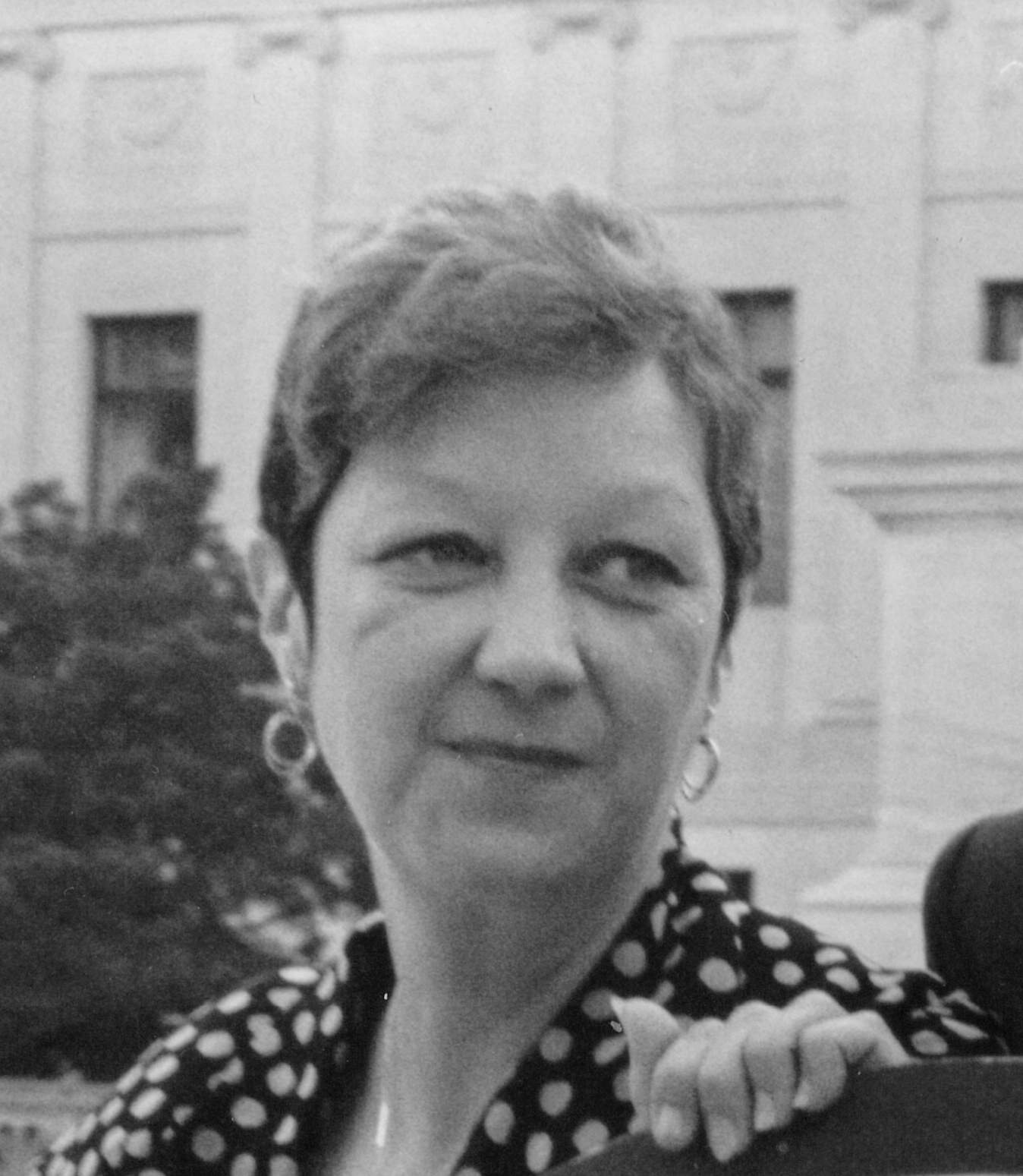
- McCorvey in 1989
- Born: Norma Leah Nelson; September 22, 1947; Simmesport, Louisiana, U.S.
- Died: February 18, 2017 (aged 69); Katy, Texas, U.S.
- Other name: Jane Roe
- Known for: Plaintiff in Roe v. Wade; abortion activist; anti-abortion activist
- Spouse: Elwood McCorvey (m. 1964; div. 1965)
- Partner: Connie Gonzalez (1970–1993)
- Children: 3, including Shelley

Norma Leah Nelson McCorvey (née Nelson; September 22, 1947 – February 18, 2017), also known by the pseudonym Jane Roe, was the plaintiff in the landmark 1973 American legal case Roe v. Wade in which the U.S. Supreme Court ruled that individual state laws banning abortion were unconstitutional.

Later in her life, McCorvey became an Evangelical Protestant and in her remaining years, a Catholic, and took part in the anti-abortion movement. McCorvey stated then that her involvement in Roe was "the biggest mistake of [her] life". However, in the Nick Sweeney documentary AKA Jane Roe, McCorvey said, in what she called her "deathbed confession", that "she never really supported the anti-abortion movement" and that she had been paid for her professed anti-abortion sentiments.

== Early life ==
Norma Leah Nelson was born in Simmesport, Louisiana, and spent her early childhood at her family's residence in Lettsworth in Pointe Coupee Parish. Later in her childhood, the family moved to Houston. Norma's father, Olin Nelson, a TV repairman, left the family when she was 13 years old, and her parents subsequently divorced. She and her brother Jimmy were then under the dominion of their mother, Mary Nelson (née' Gautreaux), a violent alcoholic. Mary had been raised a Pentecostal, but Olin led the family as Jehovah's Witnesses.

Norma's troubles with the law began at age ten when she robbed the cash register at a gas station and ran away to Oklahoma City with a friend. They tricked a hotel worker into letting them rent a room; after two days, a maid walked in on her and her female friend kissing. Norma was arrested and taken to court, where she was declared a ward of the state and a judge sent her to a Catholic boarding school, though she did not become Catholic until 1998.

Norma was sent to the State School for Girls in Gainesville, Texas, on and off from ages 11 to 15. She said this was the happiest time of her childhood, and every time she was sent home, she would purposely do something bad to be sent back. After being released, she lived with her mother's cousin, who allegedly raped her every night for three weeks. When Mary found out, her cousin said Norma was lying.

While working at a restaurant, Norma met Elwood "Woody" McCorvey (born 1940), and she married him in 1964 when she was still 16. She later left him after he allegedly assaulted her. She moved in with her mother and gave birth to her first child, Melissa, in 1965. After Melissa's birth, Norma developed a severe drinking and drug problem. Soon after, she began identifying as a lesbian. In her book, she stated that she went on a weekend trip to visit two friends and left her baby with her mother, she returned to find that Mary had replaced Melissa with a baby doll and had reported Norma to the police as having abandoned her baby, and also told the police to evict Norma from the house. For weeks, Mary would not reveal Melissa's whereabouts, and finally let Norma visit her child after three months. Mary eventually allowed Norma to move back in. She also wrote that one day, Mary woke Norma up after a long day of work and told Norma to sign what were presented as insurance papers; Norma did so without reading them. However, the papers she signed were adoption papers, giving her mother custody of Melissa, and Norma was then kicked out of the house. Mary disputed that version of events, and said that Norma agreed to the adoption.

The following year, Norma again became pregnant and gave birth to a second baby, Jennifer, who was also placed for adoption.

== Roe v. Wade ==
In 1969, at the age of 21, Norma McCorvey became pregnant a third time and returned to Dallas. According to McCorvey, friends advised her to assert falsely that she had been raped by a group of black men and that she could thereby obtain a legal abortion under Texas law, which prohibited the procedure under most circumstances; sources differ over whether Texas law had such a rape exception. McCorvey took the advice, but due to a lack of police evidence or documentation, the scheme was not successful, and McCorvey later said it was a fabrication. She attempted to obtain an illegal abortion, but the recommended clinic had been closed down by authorities. Her doctor, Richard Lane, suggested that she consult Henry McCluskey, an adoption lawyer in Dallas. McCorvey stated that she was only interested in an abortion, but agreed to meet with McCluskey.

Eventually, McCorvey was referred to attorneys Linda Coffee and Sarah Weddington, who were looking for pregnant women seeking abortions. The Roe v. Wade case (Henry Wade was the district attorney) took three years of trials to reach the Supreme Court in 1973; McCorvey never attended a single trial. During the course of the lawsuit, McCorvey gave birth and placed the baby for adoption.

When McCorvey got the call from Weddington and learned that she'd prevailed in the highest court, the victory didn't mean much to her. As the journalist Joshua Prager writes..., "Her own lawyers had not much cared to know her. She, in turn, had not much cared to know about their case; when, months later, Norma listed in her red plastic datebook the important events of 1973, she included the Yom Kippur War, the Texas State Fair, and the closing of a local theater, but not the lawsuit that bore her assumed name."

After the Roe v. Wade decision, McCorvey revealed to the press that she was "Jane Roe", saying she sought an abortion because she was unemployable and greatly depressed. In 1983, McCorvey told the press that she had been raped; in 1987, she said the rape claim was untrue.

=== Baby at the center of the lawsuit ===
In 2021, Shelley Lynn Thornton was publicly revealed as having been the fetus at the center of the Roe case. Thornton became aware that McCorvey was her birth mother in 1989, after a National Enquirer journalist tracked down Thornton, who was 19 years old, and told her about her prenatal history. The journalist had been motivated by McCorvey's appearance on the Today show earlier that year, in which she said she wanted to find and meet her daughter. Learning that she was McCorvey's birth daughter greatly upset Thornton.

In 1991, Thornton became pregnant and did not have an abortion because, according to Thornton, abortion was "not part of who [she] was". By 2021, Thornton had met McCorvey's two other daughters (Thornton's half-siblings), but never met McCorvey. According to Thornton, she and McCorvey had a phone conversation in 1994, in which McCorvey told her that she should have thanked her for not having an abortion. Thornton's visceral reaction was, "What! I'm supposed to thank you for getting knocked up ... and then giving me away?" Thornton added that she "would never, ever thank [McCorvey] for not aborting [her]". She said that "when someone's pregnant with a baby, and they don't want that baby, that person develops knowing they're not wanted."

After her public revelation in 2021, Thornton stated she was "neither pro-life nor pro-choice".

== Anti-abortion activism ==
In 1994, McCorvey published her autobiography, I Am Roe. At a book signing, she was befriended by Flip Benham, an evangelical minister and national director of the anti-abortion organization Operation Rescue. McCorvey converted to Evangelical Protestantism and was baptized on August 8, 1995, by Benham, in a Dallas, Texas, backyard swimming pool—an event that was filmed for national television. Two days later, she announced that she had quit her job at an abortion clinic and had become an advocate of Operation Rescue's campaign to make abortion illegal. She voiced remorse for her part in the Supreme Court decision and said she had been a pawn for abortion activists.

On August 17, 1998, McCorvey was received into the Catholic Church in a Mass celebrated by Father Edward Robinson and concelebrated by Father Frank Pavone, director of Priests for Life, at Saint Thomas Aquinas Church in Dallas. McCorvey's second book, Won by Love, described her religious conversion and was published in 1998. In the book, she said that her change of heart occurred in 1995, when she saw a fetal development poster in an Operation Rescue office.

In 2004, McCorvey sought to have the U.S. Supreme Court overturn Roe v. Wade, saying there was now evidence that the procedure harms women, but the case was ultimately dismissed in 2005. On January 22, 2008, McCorvey endorsed Republican presidential candidate Ron Paul because of his anti-abortion position.

McCorvey remained active in anti-abortion demonstrations, including one she participated in before President Barack Obama's commencement address to the graduates of the University of Notre Dame. McCorvey was arrested on the first day of Senate hearings for the confirmation to the U.S. Supreme Court of Sonia Sotomayor after McCorvey and another protester began shouting during Senator Al Franken's opening statement. McCorvey appeared in the 2013 film Doonby, in which she delivers an anti-abortion message. She is also the subject of Joshua Prager's 2021 book, The Family Roe: An American Story.

== Personal life with Connie Gonzalez ==
Soon after giving birth a third time, as Roe v. Wade made its way through the courts, McCorvey met and began a long-term relationship with Connie Gonzalez. They lived together in Dallas for 35 years.

After converting to Catholicism, McCorvey continued to live with Gonzalez, though she described their relationship as platonic. Later in life, McCorvey stated that she was no longer a lesbian, although she subsequently said that her religious conversion to Evangelical Christianity, and renunciation of her sexuality, were financially motivated. McCorvey moved out of the house she shared with Gonzalez in 2006, shortly after Gonzalez suffered a stroke.

== Death ==
Norma McCorvey died of cardiac arrest in Katy, Texas, on February 18, 2017, at the age of 69.

== AKA Jane Roe documentary ==
On May 22, 2020, FX aired a documentary titled AKA Jane Roe. It chronicled McCorvey's life and the financial incentives to change her views on abortion. In an interview conducted for the film shortly before her death, in what she referred to as her "deathbed confession", McCorvey said her anti-abortion activism had been "all an act", which she did because she was paid, saying she did not care whether a woman got an abortion: "I was the big fish. I think it was a mutual thing. I took their money and they'd put me out in front of the cameras and tell me what to say. That's what I'd say." McCorvey added: "If a young woman wants to have an abortion, that's no skin off my ass. That's why they call it choice."

Robert Schenck, a formerly anti-abortion evangelical pastor who worked with McCorvey, verified the claim made in the documentary of her receiving financial compensation. He admitted his group paid her to speak against abortion: "Her name and photo would command some of the largest windfalls of dollars for my group and many others, but the money we gave her was modest. More than once, I tried to make up for it with an added check, but it was never fair." According to tax documents, McCorvey received at least $450,000 from anti-abortion groups during her years as an activist. Schenck said he was surprised that McCorvey later stated she favored abortion rights, although he said he knew she "harboured doubts about the pro-life message she was telegraphing".

Pavone, who had a decades-long association with McCorvey, said she was not on the payroll of his organization, Priests for Life, and he did not believe her activism was disingenuous: "I can even see her being emotionally cornered to get those words out of her mouth, but the things that I saw in 22 years with her—the thousands and thousands of conversations that we had—that was real." He later wrote, "So abortion supporters are claiming Norma McCorvey, the Jane Roe of Roe v. Wade, wasn't sincere in her conversion. She was. I was her spiritual guide for 22 years, received her into the Catholic Church, kept regular contact, spoke with her the day she died, and conducted her funeral."

Abby Johnson, who worked for Planned Parenthood before joining the anti-abortion movement, said that McCorvey telephoned her days before her death to express remorse for abortion. Johnson said she believed McCorvey was a damaged woman who should not have been thrust into the spotlight so quickly after turning against abortion: "I don't have any problem believing that in the last year of her life that she tried to convince herself abortion was OK. But I know at the end of her life, she did not believe that."

== Posthumous tribute ==
In 2019, Time created 89 new covers to celebrate women of the year starting from 1920; it chose “JANE ROE” for 1973.

== Books ==
- McCorvey, Norma & Meisler, Andy (1994). I Am Roe. New York: Harper Collins. ISBN 0060170107.
- McCorvey, Norma & Thomas, Gary (1997). Won by Love. Nashville: Thomas Nelson Publishers. ISBN 0785272372.
- Prager, Joshua (2021). The Family Roe: An American Story. W. W. Norton & Company. ISBN 978-0393247725.
