= Kenneth Prager =

American physician (born 1943)

- Born: January 3, 1943 (age 83)
- Education: Columbia College; Harvard Medical School
- Occupation: Physician
- Children: Joshua Prager
- Relatives: Dennis Prager (brother)
- Medical career
- Institutions: Columbia University; Columbia Medical School

Kenneth Prager (born January 3, 1943) is an American physician. He is Professor of Medicine, Division of Pulmonary, Allergy and Critical Care Medicine, Director of Clinical Ethics and Chairman of the Medical Ethics Committee at Columbia University Medical Center.

Prager is a 1964 graduate of Columbia College and a 1968 graduate of Harvard Medical School.

He spent two years in the Indian Health Service practicing general medicine on the Cheyenne River Sioux Indian Reservation in South Dakota after his medical internship. Dr. Prager held clandestine medical clinics in the Soviet Union during a visit to Refuseniks in 1986, and later set up the first U.S. - Soviet medical student exchange program between Columbia's medical school and the Moscow Medical Academy.

Prager is the brother of conservative commentator and co-founder of PragerU, Dennis Prager and the father of the former reporter for The Wall Street Journal, Joshua Prager.

Prager has occasionally written newspaper op-eds on medical ethics.

== See also ==
- Dennis Prager
- PragerU
