= Rebbe (book) =

2014 non-fiction book

- Author: Joseph Telushkin
- Language: English
- Publisher: HarperWave
- Publication date: June 10, 2014
- Pages: 640
- ISBN: 978-0062318985

Rebbe: The Life and Teachings of Menachem M. Schneerson, the Most Influential Rabbi in Modern History is a biography of Rabbi Menachem Mendel Schneerson authored by Joseph Telushkin and published in 2014.

== About the book ==
The biography presents an account of Rabbi Menachem Mendel Schneerson, focusing on his leadership of the Chabad-Lubavitch movement, which expanded significantly during his tenure. Schneerson is noted for his interactions with various political and cultural figures, including Ronald Reagan, Robert F. Kennedy, Yitzhak Rabin, Menachem Begin, Elie Wiesel, and Bob Dylan. He was involved in initiatives related to Jewish outreach and humanitarian efforts, and was regarded by some as a significant figure in matters concerning the global Jewish community.

== Critical reception ==
The book received generally positive reviews from publications such as The Wall Street Journal, NY1, The Forward, and Booklist. It also achieved commercial success, appearing on The New York Times and Reuters bestseller lists for hardcover nonfiction in 2014.
