= Linda Coffee =

American lawyer (born 1942)

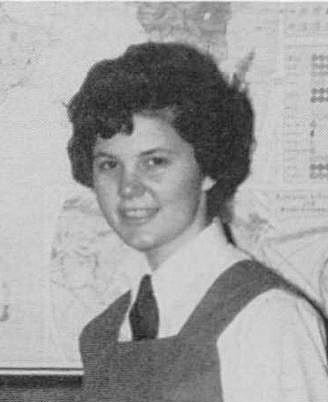
- Coffee as a high school student in 1961
- Born: December 25, 1942 (age 82)
- Education: Rice University (BA); University of Texas (LLB)
- Occupation: Lawyer

Linda Nellene Coffee (born December 25, 1942) is an American lawyer living in Dallas, Texas. Coffee is best known, along with Sarah Weddington, for arguing the precedent-setting United States Supreme Court case Roe v. Wade.

== Early and personal life ==
Coffee was born into a Southern Baptist family. She met her partner in winter 1983 in response to a personal ad.

== Education ==
Coffee earned a Bachelor of Arts in German from Rice University in 1965 followed by a Bachelor of Laws degree from the University of Texas in February 1968. In May 1968, she was licensed to practice law in Texas.

== Career ==
Once she graduated from law school she worked for the Texas Legislative Council. The Texas Legislative Council does research for the Texas legislature. Coffee was also a clerk for Sarah Hughes, who was a federal judge in Texas. Coffee was a member of the Women's Equity Action League, an organization working toward equal employment opportunities for women.

After Roe, Coffee worked on bankruptcy cases.

=== Roe v. Wade ===
Linda Coffee and Sarah Weddington argued in favor of Norma McCorvey, also known as Jane Roe, and her right to have an abortion in the case Roe v Wade. Coffee came up with the name Jane Roe. Although Weddington is more well known for this case, Coffee was the one that came in contact with Norma McCorvey. It was argued that a woman has a constitutional right to have an abortion because of the Fourteenth Amendment. The challenged Texas law only permitted abortion only if it was medically necessary to save the life of the woman. The Court's decision was ultimately handed down in January 1973, overturning Texas’ abortion law by a 7-2 majority and legalizing abortion within the first trimester of pregnancy. This was a landmark decision because it enabled women everywhere in America to have an abortion in their first trimester and struck down many federal and state laws regarding abortion.

Reacting to the leaked draft opinion in Dobbs v. Jackson Women's Health Organization, she lamented the prospect of Roe being overturned. She opined that the leak was unethical and that states will either try to allow abortion or restrict it, advising abortion rights litigators that "They should try to carry on the best they can." Following the decision to overturn Roe, Coffee said the Supreme Court's decision to overturn it "flies in the face of American freedom" and "destroys dignity of all American women".
