= Guilty =

Guilty or The Guilty may refer to:

- Guilt (emotion), an experience that occurs when a person believes they have violated a moral standard

== Law ==
- Culpability, the degree to which an agent can be held responsible for action or inaction
- Guilt (law), a finding of legal culpability
- Guilty plea, a formal admission of legal culpability

== Film ==
- Guilty (1916 film), a silent drama starring Harry Carey
- Guilty (1922 film), a silent Western by Ranger Bill Miller
- Guilty (1928 film), a German silent film
- Guilty? (1930 film), a film directed by George B. Seitz
- The Guilty (1947 film), an American film noir
- Guilty? (1951 film), a French film directed by Yvan Noé
- Guilty (1953 film), an Iranian film
- The Guilty (2000 film), an American crime film starring Bill Pullman
- Guilty (2009 film), a film featuring John Hambrick
- Guilty (2011 film), a French film
- Guilty (2015 film) or Talvar, an Indian film
- The Guilty (2018 film), a Danish film
  - The Guilty (2021 film), an American remake of the Danish film
- Guilty (2020 film), an Indian Netflix feature film

== Publications ==
- The Guilty (Baldacci novel), a 2015 novel by David Baldacci
- The Guilty (novel series), a 2002 Japanese light novel series
- Guilty: Liberal "Victims" and Their Assault on America, a 2009 book by Ann Coulter
- Guilty (Le Coupable), a 1944 book by Georges Bataille
- Guilty (manga), a 2017 Japanese manga series by Ai Okaue

== Music ==
=== Albums ===
- Guilty! (album), by Eric Burdon and Jimmy Witherspoon, 1971
- Guilty (Ayumi Hamasaki album) or the title song, 2008
- Guilty (Barbra Streisand album) or the title song (see below), 1980
  - The Guilty Demos, an album containing the demos made by Barry Gibb for Streisand's album, 2006
- Guilty (Blue album) or the title song (see below), 2003
- Guilty (Glay album), 2013
- Guilty (Hugh Cornwell album), 1997
- Guilty (Straight Faced album) or the title song, 1995
- Guilty: 30 Years of Randy Newman, a box set or its 1974 title song (see below), 1998
- Guilty, by The Vibrators, 1982

=== EPs ===
- Guilty (EP) or the title song, 2023 by Taemin
- Guilty, by Oi Polloi, 1993
- Guilty, by Unsraw, 2010
- Guilty, by Octavia Sperati, 2002

=== Songs ===
- "Guilty" (All song), 1994
- "Guilty" (Barbra Streisand and Barry Gibb song), 1980
- "Guilty" (Blue song), 2003
- "Guilty" (Gravity Kills song), 1996
- "Guilty" (Mike Oldfield instrumental), 1979
- "Guilty" (PJ Harvey song), 2016
- "Guilty" (The Pearls song), 1974
- "Guilty" (The Rasmus song), 2004
- "Guilty" (Richard Whiting, Harry Akst and Gus Kahn song), 1931; popularised by Margaret Whiting (1946) and by Johnny Desmond (1946)
- "Guilty" (Since October song), 2009
- "Guilty" (The Statler Brothers song), 1983
- "Guilty" (Teddy Swims song), 2025
- "Guilty" (The Warren Brothers song), 1998
- "Guilty", by Alice Cooper from Alice Cooper Goes to Hell, 1976
- "Guilty", by Cory Marks from Sorry for Nothing, 2024
- "Guilty", by De Souza feat. Shèna, 2007
- "Guilty", by Jim Reeves, 1963
- "Guilty", by the Kinks from Word of Mouth, 1984
- "Guilty", by Lime, 1983
- "Guilty", by Marina and the Diamonds from The Family Jewels, 2010
- "Guilty", by the Newsboys from Love Riot, 2016
- "Guilty", by Paloma Faith from The Architect, 2017
- "Guilty", by Randy Newman from Good Old Boys, 1974
- "Guilty", by Stone Temple Pilots from Stone Temple Pilots, 2018
- "Guilty", by Usher from Raymond v. Raymond, 2010

== Television ==
=== Series ===
- Guilty! (TV series), a 1990s British mock-court comedy programme
- The Guilty, a 1992 British serial featuring Lee Ross
- The Guilty (TV series), a 2013 British crime drama

=== Episodes ===
- "Guilty" (Arrow)
- "Guilty" (Awake)
- "Guilty" (Desperate Housewives)
- "Guilty" (Hunter)
- "Guilty" (Person of Interest)
- "Guilty" (Spider-Man)
- "Guilty" (Wildfire)

== Video games ==
- Guilty (video game), a 1995 adventure game published by Psygnosis

== See also ==
- Guilt (disambiguation)
