= Roe v. Wade =

1973 US Supreme Court decision on abortion, overruled 2022

- Supreme Court of the United States

Argued December 13, 1971 Reargued October 11, 1972 Decided January 22, 1973
- Full case name: Jane Roe, et al. v. Henry Wade, District Attorney of Dallas County
- Citations: 410 U.S. 113 (more) 93 S. Ct. 705; 35 L. Ed. 2d 147; 1973 U.S. LEXIS 159
- Related cases: Doe v. Bolton
- Argument: Oral argument
- Reargument: Reargument
- Decision: Opinion

Case history
- Prior: Judgment for plaintiffs, injunction denied, 314 F. Supp. 1217 (N.D. Tex. 1970); probable jurisdiction noted, 402 U.S. 941 (1971); set for reargument, 408 U.S. 919 (1972)
- Subsequent: Rehearing denied, 410 U.S. 959 (1973)

Questions presented
- Whether Articles 1191-1194 and 1196 of the Texas Penal Code by limiting the grounds for the performance of abortions deprive women and physicians of their fundamental rights of privacy and liberty are in violation of the Ninth and Fourteenth Amendments to the Constitution.

Holding
- State criminal abortion laws that except from criminality only a life-saving procedure on the mother's behalf without regard to the stage of her pregnancy and other interests involved violate the Due Process Clause of the Fourteenth Amendment, which protects against state action the right to privacy, including a woman's qualified right to terminate her pregnancy. Though the State cannot override that right, it has legitimate interests in protecting both the pregnant woman's health and the potentiality of human life, each of which interests grows and reaches a "compelling" point at various stages of the woman's approach to term. District Court for the Northern District of Texas affirmed in part and reversed in part.

Court membership
- Chief Justice Warren E. Burger Associate Justices William O. Douglas · William J. Brennan Jr. Potter Stewart · Byron White; Thurgood Marshall · Harry Blackmun; Lewis F. Powell Jr. · William Rehnquist

Case opinions
- Majority: Blackmun, joined by Burger, Douglas, Brennan, Stewart, Marshall, Powell
- Concurrence: Burger
- Concurrence: Douglas
- Concurrence: Stewart
- Dissent: White, joined by Rehnquist
- Dissent: Rehnquist

Laws applied
- U.S. Const. Amend. XIV; Tex. Code Crim. Proc. arts. 1191–94, 1196
- Overruled by
- Planned Parenthood v. Casey (1992, in part); Dobbs v. Jackson Women's Health Organization (2022, in full)

Roe v. Wade, 410 U.S. 113 (1973), was a landmark decision of the U.S. Supreme Court in which the Court ruled that the Constitution of the United States protected the right of pregnant women to choose to have an abortion before the point of fetal viability. The decision struck down many state abortion laws, and it sparked an ongoing abortion debate in the United States about whether, or to what extent, abortion should be legal, who should decide the legality of abortion, and what the role of moral and religious views in the political sphere should be. The decision also shaped debate concerning which methods the Supreme Court should use in constitutional adjudication.

The Supreme Court overruled Roe in 2022 in Dobbs v. Jackson Women's Health Organization after years of sustained opposition from the anti-abortion movement and many legal conservatives.

The case was brought by Norma McCorvey—under the legal pseudonym "Jane Roe"—who, in 1969, became pregnant with her third child. McCorvey wanted an abortion but lived in Texas, where abortion was legal only when necessary to save the mother's life. Her lawyers, Sarah Weddington and Linda Coffee, filed a lawsuit on her behalf in U.S. federal court against her local district attorney, Henry Wade, alleging that Texas's abortion laws were unconstitutional. A special three-judge court of the U.S. District Court for the Northern District of Texas ruled in her favor. The parties appealed this ruling to the Supreme Court. In January 1973, the Supreme Court issued a 7–2 decision in McCorvey's favor holding that the Due Process Clause of the Fourteenth Amendment to the United States Constitution provides a fundamental "right to privacy", which protects a pregnant woman's right to an abortion. However, it also held that the right to abortion is not absolute and must be balanced against the government's interest in protecting both women's health and prenatal life. It resolved these competing interests by announcing a pregnancy trimester timetable to govern all abortion regulations in the United States. The Court also classified the right to abortion as "fundamental", which required courts to evaluate challenged abortion laws under the "strict scrutiny" standard, the most stringent level of judicial review in the United States.

The Supreme Court's decision in Roe is among the most controversial in U.S. history. Roe was criticized by many in the legal community, including some who thought that Roe reached the correct result but went about it the wrong way, and some called the decision a form of judicial activism. Others argued that Roe did not go far enough, as it was placed within the framework of civil rights rather than human rights.

The decision radically reconfigured the voting coalitions of the Republican and Democratic parties in the following decades. Anti-abortion politicians and activists sought for decades to restrict abortion or overrule the decision; polls into the 21st century showed that a plurality and a majority, especially into the late 2010s to early 2020s, opposed overruling Roe. Despite criticism of the decision, the Supreme Court reaffirmed Roe's central holding in Planned Parenthood v. Casey (1992), although it overruled Roe's trimester framework and abandoned its "strict scrutiny" standard in favor of an "undue burden" test.

== Background ==
=== History of abortion laws in the United States ===
State abortion laws at the time of Roe v. Wade were predominately loosest in the Southern United States. Since, demographic support for legality has radically shifted. Fully illegal (1 state). Legal in cases of risk to woman's life (29 states). Legal in cases of rape (1 state). Legal in cases of risk to woman's health (2 states). Legal in cases of risk to woman's health, rape or incest, or likely damaged fetus (13 states). Legal at doctor's discretion (5 states).

Abortion was a fairly common practice in the history of the United States, and was not always a public controversy. At a time when society was more concerned with the serious consequences of women becoming pregnant out of wedlock, family affairs were handled out of public view. The criminality of abortion at common law is a matter of debate by historians and legal scholars.

In 1821, Connecticut passed the first state statute legislating abortion in the United States; it forbade the use of poisons in abortion. After the 1840s, there was an upsurge in abortions. In the 19th century, the medical profession was generally opposed to abortion, which Mohr argues arose due to competition between men with medical degrees and women without one. The practice of abortion was one of the first medical specialties, and was practiced by unlicensed people; well-off people had abortions and paid well. The press played a key role in rallying support for anti-abortion laws. According to James S. Witherspoon, a former briefing attorney for the Court of Appeals for the Third Supreme Judicial District of Texas, abortion was not legal before quickening in 27 out of all 37 states in 1868; by the end of 1883, 30 of the 37 states, six of the ten U.S. territories, and the Kingdom of Hawaiʻi, where abortion had once been common, had codified laws that restricted abortion before quickening. More than 10 states allowed pre-quickening abortions, before the quickening distinction was eliminated, and every state had anti-abortion laws by 1900.

In the United States, before specific statutes were made against it, abortion was sometimes considered a common law offense, such as by William Blackstone and James Wilson. In all states throughout the 19th and early 20th century, pre-quickening abortions were always considered to be actions without a lawful purpose. This meant that if the mother died, the individual performing the abortion was guilty of murder. This aspect of common law regarded pre-quickening abortions as a type of inchoate offense. Negative liberty rights from common law did not apply in situations caused by consensual or voluntary behavior, which allowed for abortions of fetuses conceived in a consensual manner to be common law offenses. The majority opinion for Roe v. Wade authored in Justice Harry Blackmun's name would later state that the criminalization of abortion did not have "roots in the English common-law tradition", and was thought to return to the more permissive state of pre-1820s abortion laws. One purpose for banning abortion was to preserve the life of the fetus, another was to protect the life of the mother, another was to create deterrence against future abortions, and another was to avoid injuring the mother's ability to have children. Judges did not always distinguish between which purpose was more important. Rather than arresting the women having the abortions, legal officials were more likely to interrogate them to obtain evidence against the individual doing the abortions. This law enforcement strategy was a response to juries which refused to convict women prosecuted for abortion in the 19th century. In 1973, Justice Blackmun's opinion stated that "the restrictive criminal abortion laws in effect in a majority of States today are of relatively recent vintage".

During the 1960s and early 1970s, opposition to abortion was concentrated among members of the political left and the Democratic Party, although feminists within predominately supported legalization. Most liberal Catholics and Mainline Protestants (both of which tended to vote for the Democratic Party) opposed liberalizing laws surrounding abortion while most other Protestants, including evangelicals, supported doing so as a matter of religious liberty, what they saw as a lack of biblical condemnation, and belief in non-intrusive government.

By 1971, elective abortion on demand was effectively available in Alaska, California, Hawaii, New York, Washington, and Washington, D.C. Some women traveled to jurisdictions where it was legal, although not all could afford to. In 1971, Shirley Wheeler was charged with manslaughter after Florida hospital staff reported her illegal abortion to the police. Wheeler was one of a few women who were prosecuted by their states for abortion. She received a sentence of two years probation and, as an option under her probation, chose to move back into her parents' house in North Carolina. The Playboy Foundation donated $3,500 to her defense fund and Playboy denounced her prosecution. The Boston Women's Abortion Coalition raised money and held a rally where attendees listened to speakers from the Women's National Abortion Action Coalition (WONAAC). Her conviction was overturned by the Supreme Court of Florida.

=== History of the case ===
Sarah Weddington recruited Linda Coffee to help her with abortion litigation. Their first plaintiffs were a married couple; they joined after the woman heard Coffee give a speech. The intended suit would state that abortions were medically necessary for the woman. The woman had a neurochemical disorder and it was considered medically necessary that she not give birth or raise children, yet they did not want to abstain from sex, and contraception might fail. The attorneys were concerned about standing since the woman was not pregnant. Weddington later wrote that they "needed to find a pregnant Texas woman who wanted an abortion and would be willing to be a plaintiff." They also wanted to increase the likelihood that the panel selection would help them win in court. They wanted to present their case to a three-judge panel which included a judge they thought would be sympathetic, which was a possibility only by filing a case in Dallas. If either of the two cases they filed in Dallas were assigned favorably, they intended to ask for the other one to be consolidated with it.

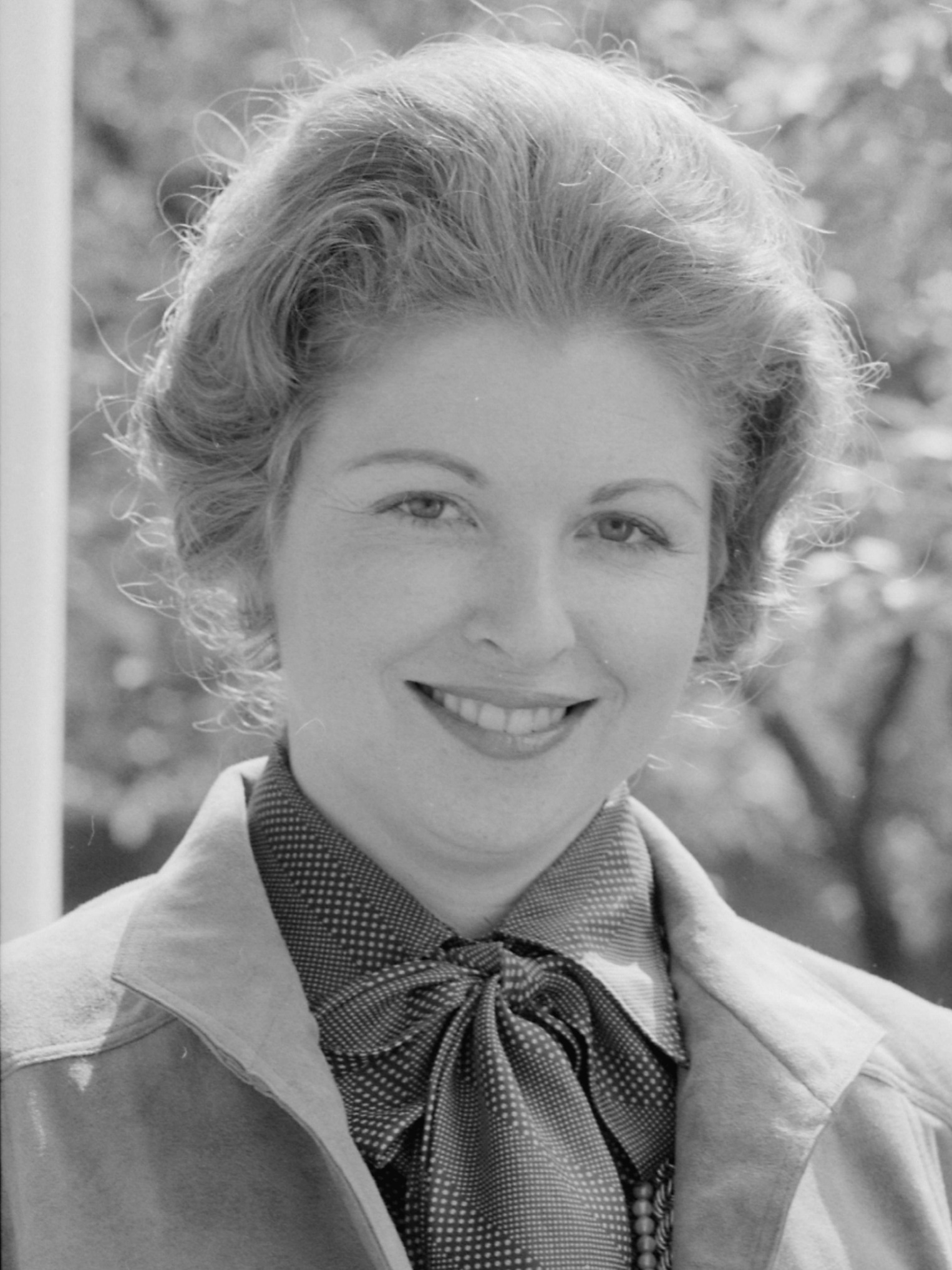
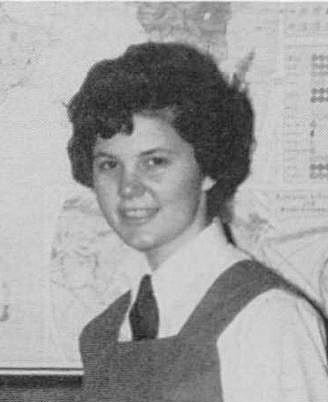
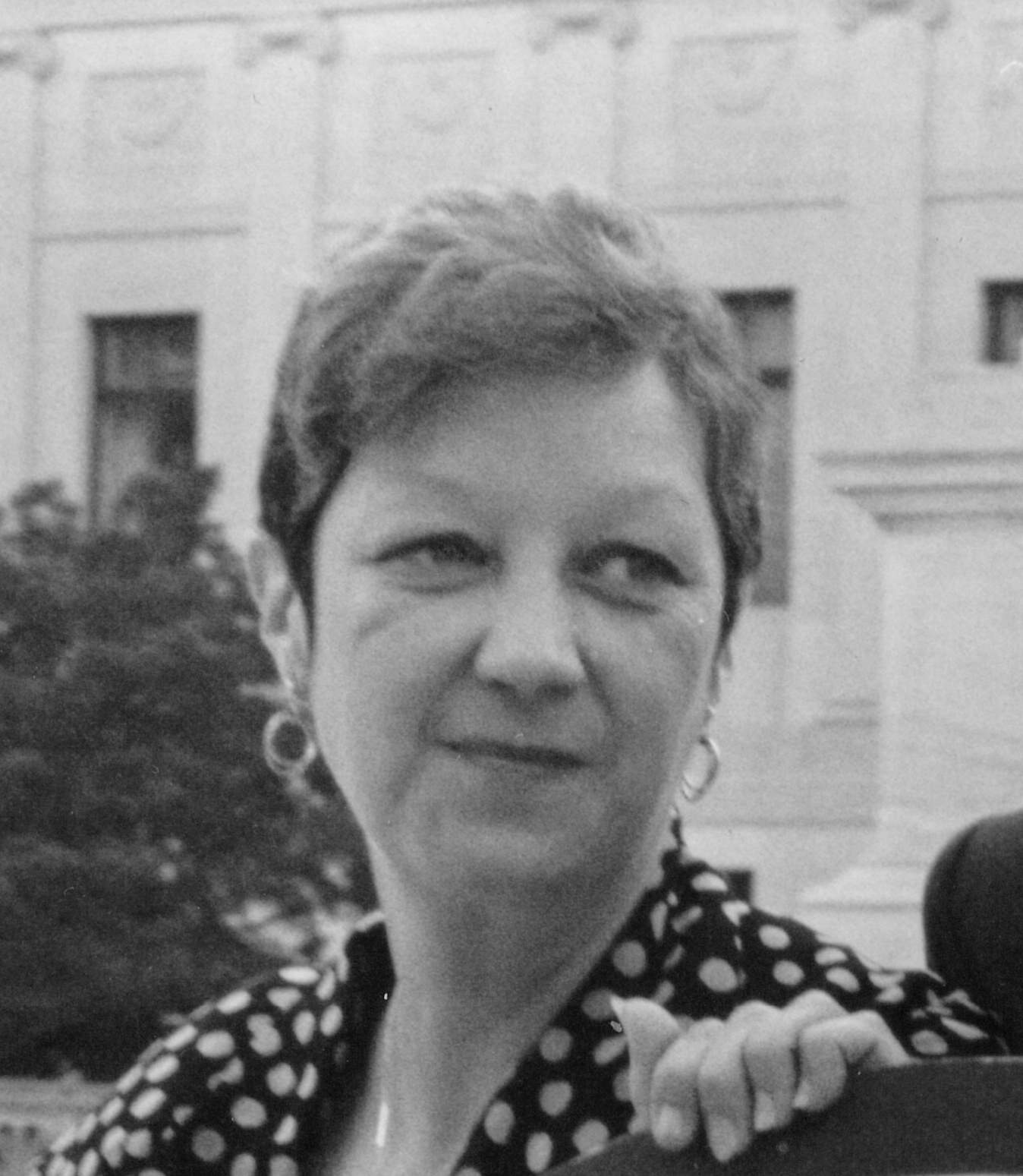
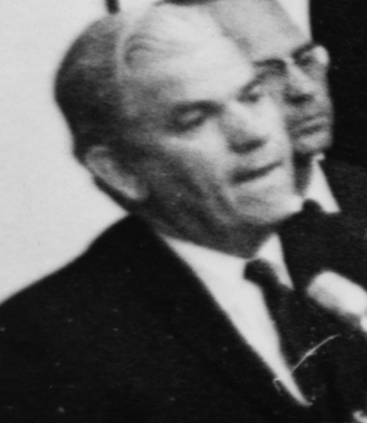
Sarah Weddington (upper left) and Linda Coffee (upper right) were the two attorneys who represented the pseudonymous "Jane Roe" (Norma McCorvey, lower left) against Henry Wade (lower right).

At first, Weddington was unsuccessful in finding a suitable pregnant woman. In June 1969, 21-year-old Norma McCorvey discovered she was pregnant with her third child. Ordinarily, lawyers are not allowed to directly solicit clients without any prior relationship, but McCorvey's situation qualified for an exception in the no solicitation rule which allows lawyers to solicit new clients for public interest cases. According to a sworn statement made in 2003, McCorvey asked if she had what was needed to be part of Weddington and Coffee's lawsuit. She recounted being told, "Yes. You're white. You're young, pregnant, and you want an abortion." Both McCorvey's whiteness and her lower social class were crucial factors in the attorneys' choice to have her as their plaintiff.

In 1970, Coffee and Weddington filed Roe v. Wade as a lawsuit in the U.S. District Court for the Northern District of Texas on behalf of McCorvey under the legal pseudonym "Jane Roe", and they also filed Does v. Wade on behalf of the married couple. The defendant for both cases was Henry Wade, who represented the State of Texas as the Dallas County District Attorney. Weddington later stated that she "saw Roe as part of a much larger effort by many attorneys" whose collective interests she represented. James H. Hallford was a physician who was in the process of being prosecuted for performing two abortions. The Court allowed him to join the suit as a physician-intervenor on behalf of Jane Roe.

On June 2, 1970, three months after the lawsuit was filed, McCorvey gave birth to a daughter at Dallas Osteopathic Hospital; the baby was adopted by a couple in Texas three days after her birth, and was raised as Shelley Lynn Thornton.

One of the cases was assigned to a panel of judges which included Judge Sarah T. Hughes, who they thought would be sympathetic, and the cases were consolidated. In accordance with the Court's rules, two of the judges hearing the consolidated case were assigned on the basis of their judicial district, and the third judge on the panel was a circuit court judge chosen by the Chief Justice of the United States.

The consolidated lawsuit was heard by a three-judge panel consisting of district court judges Sarah T. Hughes and William McLaughlin Taylor Jr. and appellate judge Irving Loeb Goldberg of the U.S. Court of Appeals for the Fifth Circuit. Hughes knew Coffee, who had clerked for her from 1968 to 1969. Additionally, the backgrounds of two other judges also gave Weddington and Coffee hope they would be successful. On June 17, 1970, the three judges unanimously ruled in McCorvey's favor and declared the Texas law unconstitutional, finding that it violated the right to privacy found in the Ninth Amendment. The court relied on Justice Arthur Goldberg's 1965 concurrence in Griswold v. Connecticut. Yet the Court also declined to grant an injunction against enforcing the law, and ruled against the married couple on the basis that they lacked standing. Since Wade said he would continue to prosecute people for performing abortions, the lack of an injunction meant that McCorvey could not get an abortion.

Thornton and her parents did not become aware of their relationship to the case until they were contacted by a reporter from the National Enquirer tabloid newspaper when she was nineteen years old.

== Hearing the case ==
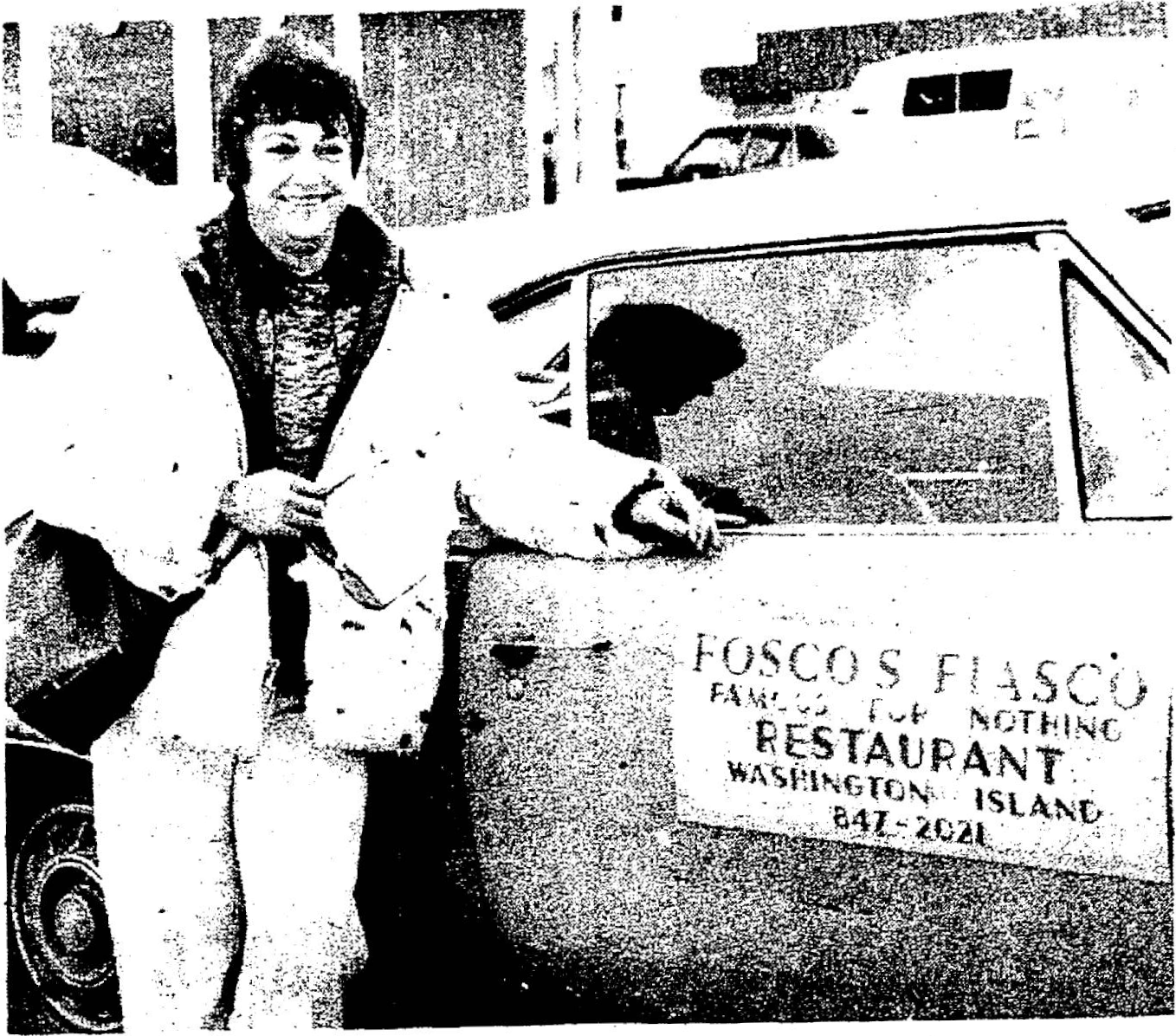
Rose Fosco, who before 1968 posed as a woman seeking an abortion during sting operations for the Chicago Police Department. As an undercover officer, she worked to break up illegal abortion rings.

=== Postponement ===
Roe v. Wade reached the Supreme Court when both sides appealed in 1970. It bypassed the Court of Appeals for the Fifth Circuit because 28 USC § 1253 authorizes a direct appeal to the Supreme Court in cases concerning the granting or denial of a civil injunction decided by a three judge panel. The case continued under the name Roe v. Wade instead of being switched to Wade v. Roe. The justices delayed taking action on Roe and a closely related case, Doe v. Bolton, until they had first decided certain other cases. One case they decided first was Younger v. Harris. The justices felt the appeals raised difficult questions on judicial jurisdiction.

Another case was United States v. Vuitch, in which they considered the constitutionality of a District of Columbia statute which banned abortion except when the mother's life or health was endangered. The Court upheld the statute on the grounds that the word "health" was not unconstitutionally vague and placed the burden of proof concerning dangers to the life or health of the mother on the prosecutor instead of on the person who had performed the abortion.

Justice William O. Douglas wrote a lengthy dissenting opinion to this case. He argued that the right to marital privacy and the limitation of family size from Griswold v. Connecticut also applied here, although he acknowledged that "on the other side is the belief of many that the fetus, once formed, is a member of the human family and that mere personal inconvenience cannot justify the fetus' destruction." He also challenged the majority opinion with a series of hypothetical questions asking whether "health" might also include the stigma of having an illegitimate child, anxiety from the pregnancy being unwanted, the physical work of raising a child, the financial drain from the added expense of another child, and far off health risks that may never actually materialize in a similar fashion to how risks were warded off with prophylactic appendectomy. Douglas' dissent made a similar legal argument to the one used two years later in Roe v. Wade. The following day after their decision was announced, the court voted to hear both Roe and Doe.

According to Blackmun, Stewart felt the cases were a straightforward application of Younger v. Harris, and enough justices agreed to hear the cases to review whether they would be suitable for federal as opposed to only state courts. This sort of review was not about the constitutionality of abortion and would not have required evidence, witnesses, or a record of facts. The oral argument was scheduled by the full Court for December 13, 1971. Before the Court could hear the oral argument, Justices Hugo Black and John Marshall Harlan II retired. Chief Justice Warren Burger asked Justice Potter Stewart and Justice Blackmun to determine whether Roe and Doe, among others, should be heard as scheduled. They recommended that the Court continue on as scheduled.

=== Oral argument ===
As she began speaking for the oral argument, Sarah Weddington was unaware that the Court had decided to hear the case to decide which courts had jurisdiction to hear it rather than as an attempt to overturn abortion laws in a broad ruling. She began by bringing up constitutional reasons why the Court should overturn Texas's abortion law, but Justice Stewart asked questions directed towards the jurisdiction question instead. Weddington replied that she saw no problem with jurisdiction and continued to talk about a constitutional right to abortion. Overall, she spent between 20 and 30 minutes discussing jurisdiction and procedure instead of constitutional issues.

In his opening argument in defense of the abortion restrictions, attorney Jay Floyd made what was later described as the "worst joke in legal history". Appearing against two female lawyers, Floyd began, "Mr. Chief Justice and may it please the Court. It's an old joke, but when a man argues against two beautiful ladies like this, they are going to have the last word." His remark was met with cold silence; abortion rights lawyer Margie Pitts Hames thought that Chief Justice Burger "was going to come right off the bench at him. He glared him down."

McCorvey did not attend either of the oral arguments along with her two lawyers. After dissuading McCorvey from an illegal abortion and getting her name signed on an affidavit for the lawsuit, Weddington did not speak again with McCorvey until four months after Roe was decided.

=== Initial discussions ===
After the first argument session, Burger assigned the task of writing the Court's opinions for both Roe and Doe to Blackmun. Douglas suggested to Blackmun that Burger assigned the opinions to him out of malicious intention, but Blackmun disagreed. He knew that Burger could not write it himself because the subject of abortion was too controversial, and his opinions might get rejected by the majority. He also understood why the other justices could not be assigned to write the opinions: Douglas was too liberal for the public to accept his word. Likewise, he might split the Court's vote by writing something radical. In addition, the quality of his opinions had suffered recently. Brennan was the only Catholic on the Court, and he would have to face Catholic political groups which were against abortion. If Marshall wrote the opinions, the ruling would be perceived as being directed towards African Americans, and he would have to face the displeasure of African American political groups. Stewart would have trouble going far enough in legalizing abortion.

At this point, Black and Harlan had been replaced by William Rehnquist and Lewis F. Powell Jr., but the first argument had already occurred before they became Supreme Court justices. Justice Blackmun worked on a preliminary opinion for Roe which argued that Texas's law was unconstitutionally vague. This approach accommodated the claims of some doctors who were concerned that prosecutors might disagree with them over what constituted "life". Blackmun thought this approach would be a good way to avoid controversy which would come with saying there was a fundamental right to abortion. Brennan and Douglas disagreed with Blackmun and wrote to him that instead he needed to focus on privacy. After communicating with the other justices, Blackmun felt that his opinion did not adequately reflect his liberal colleagues' views. In March 1972, the court issued a ruling in Eisenstadt v. Baird, a landmark case which applied the earlier marital privacy right now also to unmarried individuals.

Douglas wrote to Blackmun in May 1972 that he thought there were four judges who were definitely willing to rule in the majority—himself, Brennan, Stewart, and Marshall. Blackmun at one point thought all seven justices wanted to vote in the majority.

In May 1972, Blackmun proposed that the case be reargued. Justice Douglas threatened to write a dissent from the reargument order because he and the other liberal justices were suspicious that Rehnquist and Powell would vote to uphold the Texas abortion statutes. He was coaxed out of the action by his colleagues, and instead his dissent was merely mentioned in the reargument order without further statement or opinion. The case was reargued on October 11, 1972. Weddington continued to represent the pseudonymous Jane Roe, and Texas Assistant Attorney General Robert C. Flowers replaced Jay Floyd for Texas.

A June 1972 memo written by Douglas to his colleagues discussing the case was leaked to and published in The Washington Post before the decision was published.

=== Drafting the opinion ===
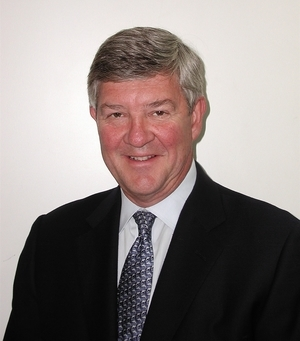
George Frampton, law clerk to Justice Harry Blackmun during the 1971–72 term

Blackmun continued to work on his opinions in both cases over the summer recess, even though there was no guarantee that he would be assigned to write them again. Over the recess, he spent a week researching the history of abortion at the Mayo Clinic in Minnesota, where he had worked in the 1950s. He talked daily on the phone with George Frampton, his 28-year-old law clerk who stayed behind in Washington, D.C. Frampton researched the history of abortion using a book authored by Lawrence Lader, the founding chairman of what is now called NARAL Pro-Choice America. Blackmun's papers made available since his death contain at least seven citations for Lader's 1966 book, Abortion. Chapter 16 of his book, "A Blueprint for Changing U.S. Abortion Laws" predicted that if abortion were to be legalized, "the possibility of community opposition is slight". Lader also predicted that "If such a theoretical case was carried to a high court, perhaps even the U.S. Supreme Court, and the judges confirmed a broad interpretation of the meaning of a threat to life, undoubtedly a landmark in abortion decisions would be reached."

The historical survey for Roe also referenced two articles by Cyril Means, who served as counsel to NARAL. In the articles, Means misrepresented the common law tradition in ways that were helpful to the Roe side. Roy Lucas, the principal attorney assisting Weddington and Coffee, had previously received a memo from his colleague David M. Tundermann about Means's scholarship. The memo stated that the conclusions in Means's articles "sometimes strain credibility." It also stated:

Where the important thing is to win the case no matter how, however, I suppose I agree with Means's technique: begin with a scholarly attempt at historical research; if it doesn't work, fudge it as necessary; write a piece so long that others will read only your introduction and conclusion; then keep citing it until courts begin picking it up. This preserves the guise of impartial scholarship while advancing the proper ideological goals.

After the Court held the second argument session, Powell said he would agree with Blackmun's conclusion but pushed for Roe to be the lead of the two abortion cases being considered. Powell also suggested that the Court strike down the Texas law on privacy grounds. Byron White was unwilling to sign on to Blackmun's opinion, and Justice Rehnquist had already decided to dissent.

During the drafting process, the justices discussed the trimester framework at great length. Powell had suggested that the point where the state could intervene be placed at viability, which Thurgood Marshall supported as well. In an internal memo to the other justices before the majority decision was published, Justice Blackmun wrote: "You will observe that I have concluded that the end of the first trimester is critical. This is arbitrary, but perhaps any other selected point, such as quickening or viability, is equally arbitrary." In the same memo he suggested that the end of the first trimester seemed more likely to get support from other justices and allowed states the ability to adjust their statutes. He was of the impression that doctors were concerned that recovering abortion patients would take up too many hospital beds, and that abortion patients later than the first trimester were more likely to require hospital beds than those whose fetuses were aborted earlier. Contrary to the justices who preferred viability, Douglas preferred the first-trimester line. Stewart said the lines were "legislative" and wanted more flexibility and consideration paid to state legislatures, though he joined Blackmun's decision. William Brennan proposed abandoning frameworks based on the age of the fetus and instead allowing states to regulate the procedure based on its safety for the mother.

== Supreme Court decision ==
On January 22, 1973, the Supreme Court issued a 7–2 decision in favor of "Jane Roe" (Norma McCorvey) holding that women in the United States had a fundamental right to choose to have an abortion without excessive government restriction and striking down Texas's abortion ban as unconstitutional. The decision was issued together with a decision in a companion case, Doe v. Bolton, which involved a similar challenge to Georgia's abortion laws.

Larry Hammond, a law clerk for Powell, gave a Time reporter a copy of the decision "on background", expecting that it would be issued by the court before the next issue of Time was published; however, due to a delay in the decision's release, the text of the decision appeared on newsstands a few hours before it was published by the court. Burger demanded a meeting with Time's editors and punishment for the leaker. Powell refused Hammond's resignation, on the grounds that "Hammond had been double-crossed" by the reporter.

=== Opinion of the Court ===
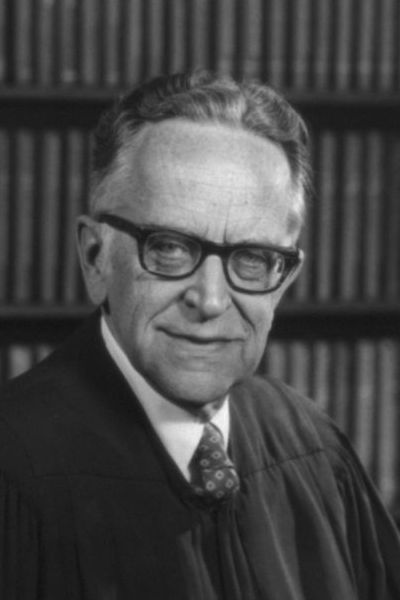
Justice Harry Blackmun, the author of the majority opinion in Roe

Justice Harry Blackmun authored the opinion of the Court—the "majority opinion"—and was joined by six other justices: Chief Justice Warren Burger and Justices Brennan, Powell, Potter Stewart, William O. Douglas, and Thurgood Marshall.

==== Mootness ====
After reciting the facts of the case, the Court's opinion first addressed several legal questions involving procedure and justiciability. These included mootness, a legal doctrine that prevents American federal courts from hearing cases that have ceased to be "live" controversies because of intervening events. Under a normal application of the doctrine, McCorvey's appeal would have been considered moot because she had already given birth to her child and therefore no longer had a pregnancy to abort.

The Court concluded that an established exception to the mootness doctrine allows consideration of cases that are "capable of repetition, yet evading review". Blackmun noted that McCorvey might get pregnant again, and pregnancy would normally conclude more quickly than an appellate process: "If that termination makes a case moot, pregnancy litigation seldom will survive much beyond the trial stage, and appellate review will be effectively denied."

==== Abortion and right to privacy ====
After dealing with mootness and standing, the Court proceeded to the main issue of the case: the constitutionality of Texas abortion law. The Court first surveyed the status of abortion throughout the history of Roman law and the English and early American common law. It also reviewed the developments of medical procedures and technology used in abortions.

Following its historical surveys, the Court introduced the concept of a constitutional "right to privacy" that it said had been intimated in earlier decisions such as Meyer v. Nebraska and Pierce v. Society of Sisters, which involved parental control over childrearing, and Griswold v. Connecticut, which involved the use of contraception. Then, "with virtually no further explanation of the privacy value", the Court ruled that regardless of exactly which provisions were involved, the U.S. Constitution and its guarantees of liberty covered a right to privacy that protected a pregnant woman's decision whether to abort a pregnancy.

This right of privacy, whether it be founded in the Fourteenth Amendment's concept of personal liberty and restrictions upon state action, as we feel it is, or, as the District Court determined, in the Ninth Amendment's reservation of rights to the people, is broad enough to encompass a woman's decision whether to terminate her pregnancy.

— Roe, 410 U.S. at 153.

The Court reasoned that outlawing abortions would infringe a pregnant woman's right to privacy for several reasons: having unwanted children "may force upon the woman a distressful life and future"; it may bring imminent psychological harm; caring for the child may tax the mother's physical and mental health; and because there may be "distress, for all concerned, associated with the unwanted child". The Court, however, rejected the notion that this right to privacy was absolute. It held instead that a woman's right to have an abortion must be balanced against other government interests, such as protecting maternal health and protecting the life of the fetus. The Court held that these government interests were sufficiently compelling to permit states to impose some limits on the right of a pregnant woman to choose to have an abortion.

A State may properly assert important interests in safeguarding health, maintaining medical standards, and in protecting potential life. At some point in pregnancy, these respective interests become sufficiently compelling to sustain regulation of the factors that govern the abortion decision. ... We, therefore, conclude that the right of personal privacy includes the abortion decision, but that this right is not unqualified and must be considered against important state interests in regulation.

— Roe, 410 U.S. at 154.

Texas's lawyers had argued that limiting abortion to situations where the mother's life was in danger was justified because life began at the moment of conception, and therefore the state's governmental interest in protecting prenatal life applied to all pregnancies regardless of their stage. The Court, however, said there was no indication that the uses of the word "person" in the Constitution were meant to include fetuses, and it rejected Texas's argument that a fetus should be considered a "person" with a legal and constitutional right to life. The Court observed that there was still great disagreement over when an unborn fetus becomes a living being.

We need not resolve the difficult question of when life begins. When those trained in the respective disciplines of medicine, philosophy, and theology are unable to arrive at any consensus, the judiciary, in this point in the development of man's knowledge, is not in a position to speculate as to the answer.

— Roe, 410 U.S. at 159.

To balance women's rights to privacy and state governments' interests in protecting mothers' health and prenatal life, the Court created the trimester framework. During the first trimester, when it was believed that the procedure was safer than childbirth, the Court ruled that a state government could place no restrictions on women's ability to choose to abort pregnancies other than imposing minimal medical safeguards, such as requiring abortions to be performed by licensed physicians. From the second trimester on, the Court ruled that evidence of increasing risks to the mother's health gave states a compelling interest that allowed them to enact medical regulations on abortion procedures so long as they were reasonable and "narrowly tailored" to protecting mothers' health. From the beginning of the third trimester on—the point at which a fetus became viable under the medical technology available in the early 1970s—the Court ruled that a state's interest in protecting prenatal life became so compelling that it could legally prohibit all abortions except where necessary to protect the mother's life or health.

Having completed its analysis, the Court concluded that Texas's abortion statutes were unconstitutional and struck them down.

A state criminal abortion statute of the current Texas type, that excepts from criminality only a life-saving procedure on behalf of the mother, without regard to pregnancy stage and without recognition of the other interests involved, is violative of the Due Process Clause of the Fourteenth Amendment.

— Roe, 410 U.S. at 164.

==== Concurrences ====
Three justices from the majority filed concurring opinions in the case. Justice Potter Stewart wrote a concurring opinion in which he said that even though the Constitution makes no mention of the right to choose to have an abortion without interference, he thought the Court's decision was a permissible interpretation of the doctrine of substantive due process, which says that the Due Process Clause's protection of liberty extends beyond simple procedures and protects certain fundamental rights. Justice William O. Douglas's concurring opinion described his view that although the Court was correct to find that the right to choose to have an abortion was a fundamental right, he thought it would have been better to derive it from the Ninth Amendment—which states that the fact that a right is not specifically enumerated in the Constitution shall not be construed to mean that American people do not possess it—rather than through the Fourteenth Amendment's Due Process Clause.

Chief Justice Warren Burger wrote a concurrence in which he wrote that he thought it would be permissible to allow a state to require two physicians to certify an abortion before it could be performed. His concurrence also states:

I do not read the Court's holdings today as having the sweeping consequences attributed to them by the dissenting Justices; the dissenting views discount the reality that the vast majority of physicians observe the standards of their profession, and act only on the basis of carefully deliberated medical judgments relating to life and health. Plainly, the Court today rejects any claim that the Constitution requires abortions on demand.

This has been interpreted as Chief Justice Burger thinking that medical standards and judgment would restrict the number of abortions. Instead of the law restricting abortions to limited circumstances as pre-Roe, now doctors would get to do the restricting.

This understanding of Roe appears to be related to several statements in the majority opinion. Justice Blackmun's majority opinion states, "the attending physician, in consultation with his patient, is free to determine, without regulation by the state, that, in his medical judgment, the patient's pregnancy should be terminated." It also states, "For the stage, prior to approximately the end of the first trimester, the abortion decision and its effectuation must be left to the medical judgment of the pregnant woman's attending physician." Six days prior to January 22, Justice Blackmun prepared "a transcript of what I shall say, and there should be at least some reason for the press not going all the way off the deep end." The unissued news release stated:

... the Court does not today hold that the Constitution compels abortion on demand. It does not today pronounce that a pregnant woman has an absolute right to abortion. It does, for the first trimester of pregnancy, cast the abortion decision and the responsibility for it upon the attending physician.

These statements appear to indicate that the justices voting in the majority thought that patients had personal physicians. Earlier in American history it was once common for people to have individual doctors, but the nature of doctor-patient relationship had already changed prior to Roe.

==== Dissents ====
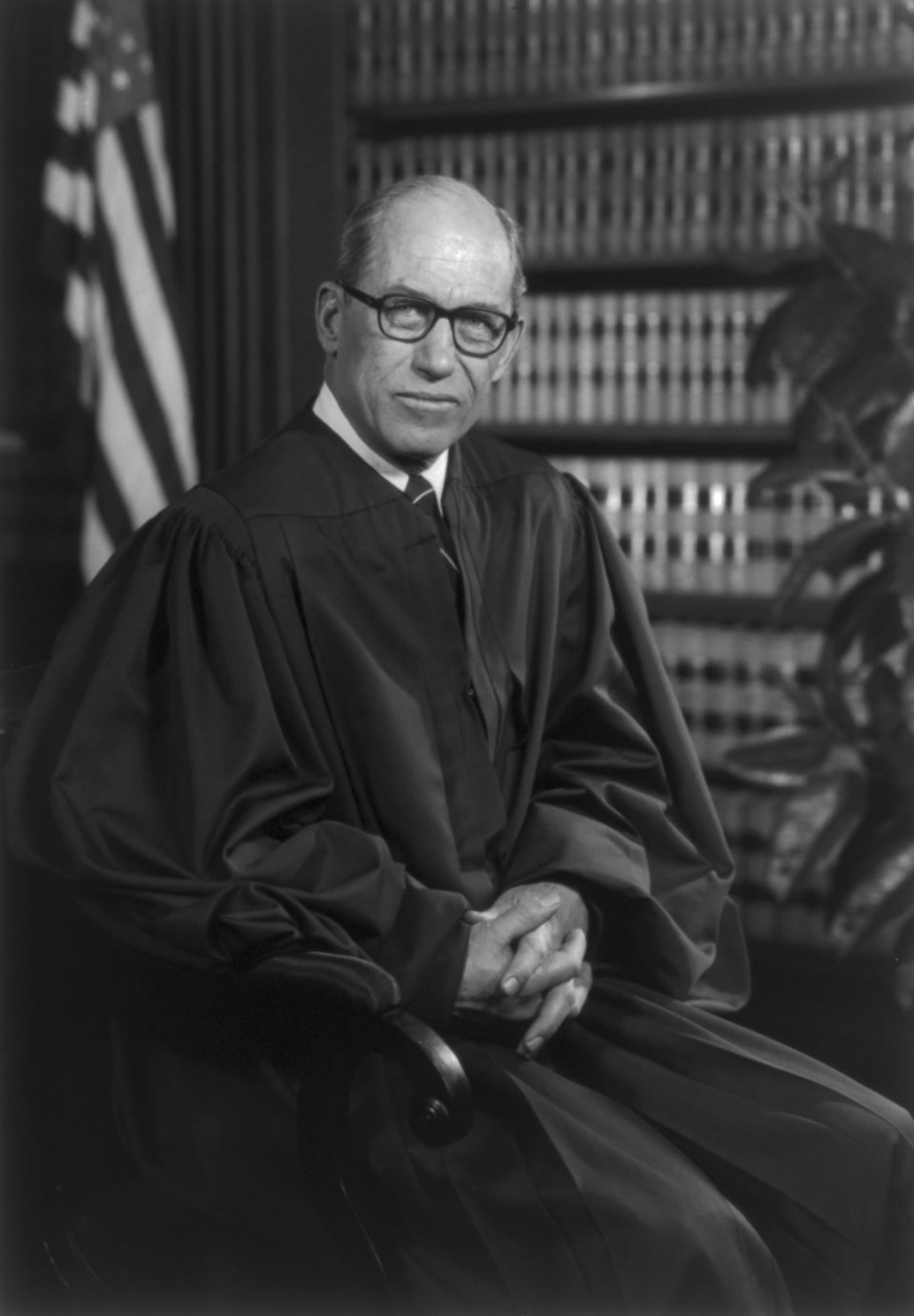
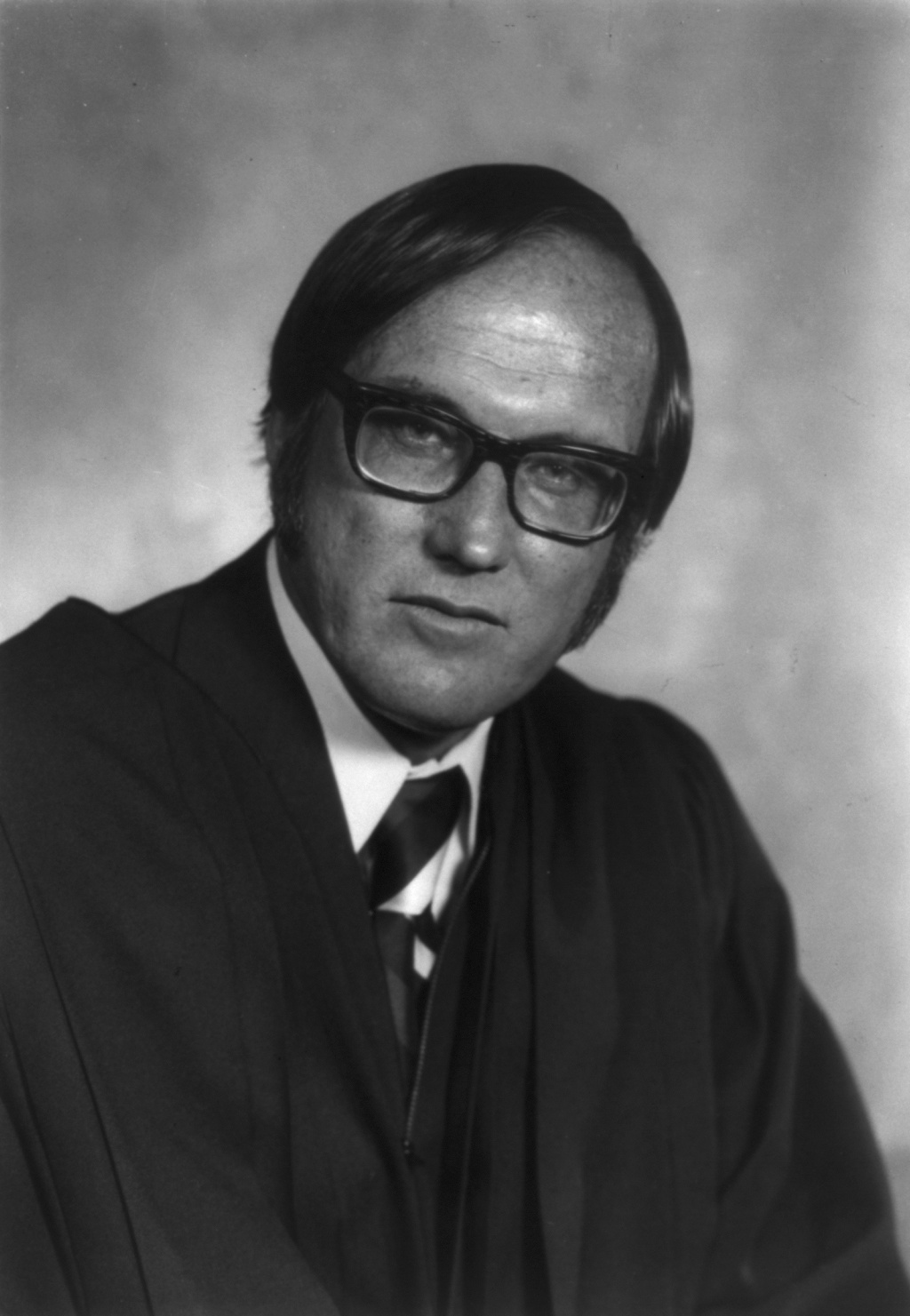
Justices Byron White (left) and William Rehnquist (right), the two dissenters from Roe v. Wade

Two justices, Byron White and William Rehnquist, dissented from the Court's decision. White's dissent, which was issued with Roe's companion case, Doe v. Bolton, argued that:

I find nothing in the language or history of the Constitution to support the Court's judgment. The Court simply fashions and announces a new constitutional right for pregnant women and, with scarcely any reason or authority for its action, invests that right with sufficient substance to override most existing state abortion statutes. The upshot is that the people and the legislatures of the 50 States are constitutionally disentitled to weigh the relative importance of the continued existence and development of the fetus, on the one hand, against a spectrum of possible impacts on the woman, on the other hand. As an exercise of raw judicial power, the Court perhaps has authority to do what it does today; but, in my view, its judgment is an improvident and extravagant exercise of the power of judicial review that the Constitution extends to this Court.

— Doe, 410 U.S. at 221–22 (White, J., dissenting).

White also argued that the legality of abortion, "for the most part, should be left with the people and the political processes the people have devised to govern their affairs."

Rehnquist's dissent compared the majority's use of substantive due process to the Court's repudiated use of the doctrine in the 1905 case Lochner v. New York. He elaborated on several of White's points and asserted that the Court's historical analysis was flawed.

To reach its result, the Court necessarily has had to find within the scope of the Fourteenth Amendment a right that was apparently completely unknown to the drafters of the Amendment. As early as 1821, the first state law dealing directly with abortion was enacted by the Connecticut Legislature. By the time of the adoption of the Fourteenth Amendment in 1868, there were at least 36 laws enacted by state or territorial legislatures limiting abortion. While many States have amended or updated their laws, 21 of the laws on the books in 1868 remain in effect today.

— Roe, 410 U.S. at 174–76 (Rehnquist, J., dissenting).

From this historical record, Rehnquist wrote, "There apparently was no question concerning the validity of this provision or of any of the other state statutes when the Fourteenth Amendment was adopted." He concluded "the drafters did not intend to have the Fourteenth Amendment withdraw from the States the power to legislate with respect to this matter."

== Reception ==
There was a strong response to the decision shortly after it was issued. The Catholic Church condemned the ruling. Prominent organized groups that responded to Roe include the National Association for the Repeal of Abortion Laws, which became the National Abortion Rights Action League in late 1973 to reflect the Court's repeal of restrictive laws, and the National Right to Life Committee.

The legal scholar Ronald Dworkin described it as "undoubtedly the best-known case the United States Supreme Court has ever decided."

=== Support for Roe and abortion rights ===
==== 1960s–1970s ====
In the 1960s, there was an alliance between the population control movement and the abortion-rights movement in the United States. Abortion rights were especially supported by younger women within the population control movement. The cooperation was mostly due to feminists who wanted some of the popularity already enjoyed by the population control movement. In addition, population control advocates thought that legalizing abortion would help solve the coming population crisis that demographers had projected.

In 1973, Hugh Moore's Population Crisis Committee and John D. Rockefeller III's Population Council both publicly supported abortion rights following Roe. Prior, public support for abortion rights within the population control movement instead came from less established organizations such as Zero Population Growth; an exception was Planned Parenthood-World Population, which supported repealing all laws against abortion in 1969. Together, population control and abortion rights advocates voiced the benefits of legalized abortion such as smaller welfare costs, fewer illegitimate births, and slower population growth. At the same time, the use of these arguments put them at odds with civil-rights movement leaders and Black Power activists who were concerned that abortion would be used to eliminate non-whites. H. Rap Brown denounced abortion as "black genocide", and Dick Gregory said that his "answer to genocide, quite simply, is eight Black kids and another one on the way."

Soon after Roe, the population control movement suffered setbacks, which caused the movement to lose political support and instead appear divisive. On June 27, 1973, a lawsuit was filed concerning the Relf sisters, 14-year-old Minnie Lee and her 12-year-old sister Alice Lee. A worker at a federally-funded family planning clinic lied to their illiterate mother, saying they would get birth control shots. Instead, the Relf sisters were sterilized without their knowledge or consent. During the next fifteen months, 80 additional women came forward about their forced sterilizations, all belonging to minority races. Concerns rose that abortions would also become compulsory. During the 1974 World Population Conference in Bucharest, Romania, most developing nations argued that the developed nations' focus on population growth was an attempt to avoid solving the deeper causes of underdevelopment, such as the unequal structure of international relations. Instead, they wanted more favorable terms under the New International Economic Order. A draft plan with fertility targets was strongly opposed by the developing countries, which surprised the delegations from the United States, Canada, and Great Britain. The final plan omitted fertility targets and instead stated, "A population policy may have a certain success if it constitutes an integral part of socio-economic development."

As members questioned the political benefits of population control rhetoric, the abortion-rights movement distanced itself from the population control movement. In October 1973, Robin Elliott circulated a memo to other Planned Parenthood members concerning opposition to "Planned Parenthood's credibility in its reference to the population problem". Instead, she thought they should use Roe inspired rhetoric about "the reaffirmation of commitment to freedom of choice in parenthood." By 1978, a NARAL handbook denounced population control.

==== 21st century ====
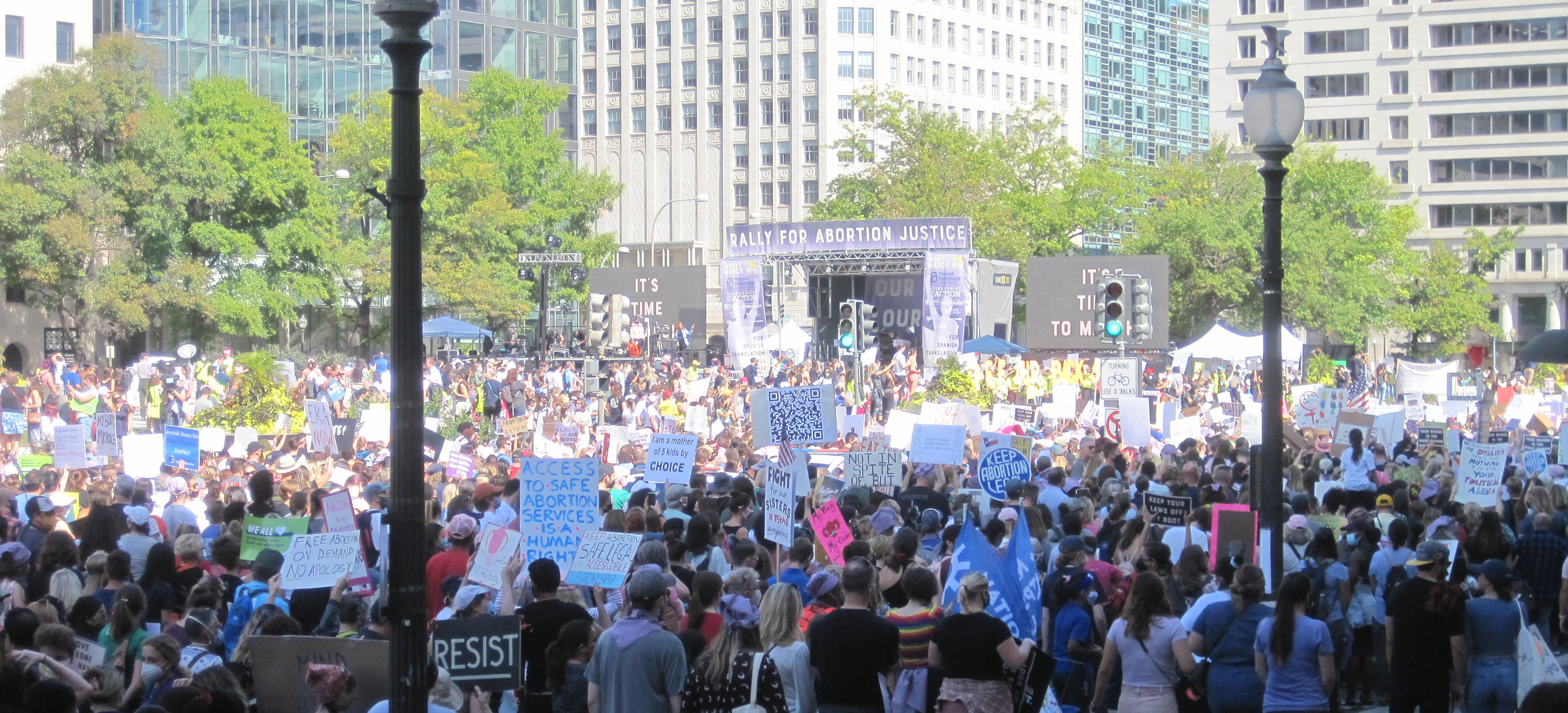
2021 Women's March, where many speakers bemoaned a looming threat to Roe

Into the 21st century, advocates of Roe describe it as vital to the preservation of women's rights, personal freedom, bodily integrity, and privacy. Advocates have also reasoned that access to safe abortion and reproductive freedom generally are fundamental rights. Supporters of Roe contend that even if abortion rights are supported by another portion of the constitution, the decision in 1973 accurately founds the right in the Fourteenth Amendment. Others support Roe despite concern that the fundamental right to abortion is found elsewhere in the Constitution but not in the portions referenced in the 1973 decision. They also tend to believe that the power balance between men and women is unequal, and that issues like access to birth control and political representation affect women's equality.

Opinion polls in late 2021 indicated that while a majority of Americans oppose overturning Roe, a sizable minority opposed overturning Roe but also desired to make abortion illegal in ways that Roe would not permit. This was attributed to poll respondents misunderstanding Roe v. Wade or misinterpreting the poll question. 2018–2019 polls showed that while 60 percent of Americans generally support abortion in the first trimester, this drops to 20 percent for the second trimester, even though Roe protects the right to abortion until the last weeks of the second trimester, and at the same time 69 percent said they would not like to see Roe overturned, compared to 29 percent who said they would like to see Roe overturned. Another poll showed that 43 percent of those who said abortion should be illegal in most or all cases opposed overturning Roe, while 26 percent of those who said abortion should be legal in most or all cases supported overturning Roe. Polls also found that men and women have similar views on abortion, which are linked to how people think about motherhood, sex, and women's social roles; supporters of Roe and abortion rights tend to see women's ability to make decisions about their bodies as fundamental to gender equality.

Most polls in the late 2010s and early 2020s showed overwhelming support, at between 85 and 90 percent, among Americans that abortion should be legal in at least some circumstances, which varies or drops depending on the specifics. A January 2022 CNN poll found a 59% majority of Americans want their state to have laws that are "more permissive than restrictive" on abortion if Roe is overturned, 20% want their state to ban abortion entirely, and another 20% want it to be restricted but not banned. In two March 2022 polls, between 61 and 64 percent of Americans said abortion should be legal in most or all cases, while between 35 and 37 percent said abortion should be illegal in most or all cases. A May 2022 Gallup poll indicated that 50% of Americans thought abortions should be legal under certain circumstances, with 35% saying it should be legal under any circumstances, and 15% saying it should be illegal in all circumstances, as well as a record number of Americans who identify as pro-choice.

Before Roe was overturned in Dobbs v. Jackson Women's Health Organization, a majority of Americans thought that Roe was safe and would not be overturned. Since the draft's leaks showed Roe to be overturned in Dobbs, as happened in June 2022, abortion became a concern and a very important issue for Democrats, who previously lagged behind Republicans on this; some Americans, in particular liberals but also a few conservatives, may have become more aware of the popular support for Roe, which they had previously understated. In June 2022, Gallup reported that a 61% majority of Americans say abortion should be legal in all or most cases, while 37% say abortion should be illegal in all or most cases. It also recorded the highest partisan divide since 1995, compared to the mid-1970s and throughout the 1980s when both Democrats and Republicans were closer on the issue. That same month, the Congregation L'Dor Va-Dor filed a lawsuit against a new law in Florida that would outlaw abortion after 15 weeks of pregnancy, including in cases of rape or incest. Unlike other legal challenges to abortion restrictions in the United States that generally rely on the right to privacy established by Roe, the synagogue argued that Florida's abortion law violates religious freedom, as "Jewish law says that life begins at birth, not at conception."

=== Opposition to Roe ===
==== Condemnation by Catholic Bishops ====
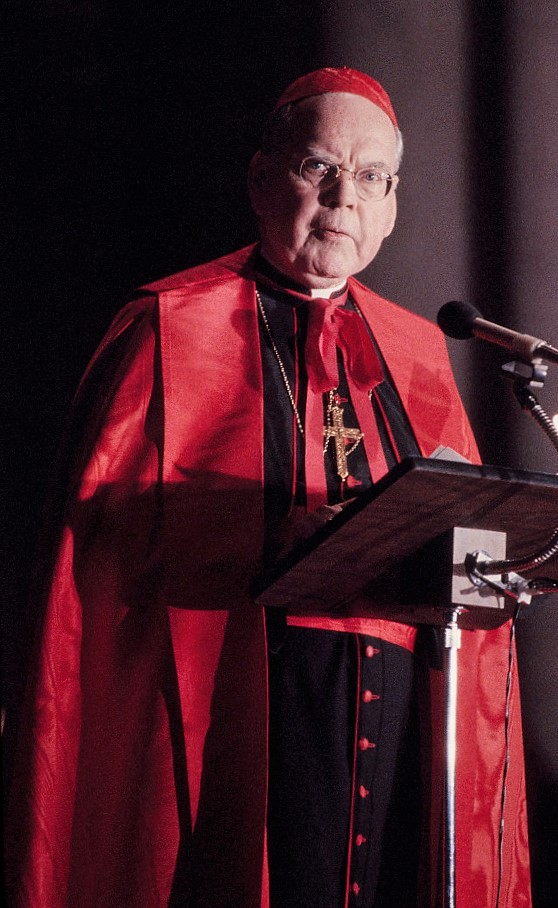
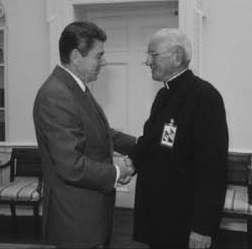
Terence Cardinal Cooke, archbishop of New York (left), along with his Philadelphia counterpart, John Cardinal Krol, pictured with Ronald Reagan (right), issued statements that the Catholic Church condemned Roe v. Wade.

The Catholic Church condemned the ruling by the Supreme Court. Blackmun wrote in his diary, "Abortion flak—3 Cardinals—Vatican—Rochester wires!"

John Cardinal Krol, the archbishop of Philadelphia who was also the president of the United States Conference of Catholic Bishops and Terence Cardinal Cooke, the archbishop of New York, both issued statements condemning the ruling. Krol called the ruling "an unspeakable tragedy for this nation" that "sets in motion developments which are terrifying to contemplate." Cooke called the decision a "horrifying action" and added:

How many millions of children prior to their birth will never live to see the light of today because of the shocking action of the majority of the United States Supreme Court today?

==== Opposition to Roe but support for abortion rights ====
Some supporters of abortion rights oppose Roe v. Wade on the grounds that it laid a foundation for abortion in civil rights rather than in human rights, which are broader and would require government entities to take active measures to ensure every woman has access to abortion. This particular position is indicated by the use of rhetoric concerning "reproductive justice", which replaces earlier rhetoric centered around "choice", such as the "pro-choice" label. Reproductive justice proponents contend that factors permitting choice are unequal, thus perpetuating oppression and serving to divide women. Reproductive justice advocates instead want abortion to be considered an affirmative right that the government would be obligated to guarantee equal access to, even if the women seeking abortions are nonwhite, poor, or live outside major metropolitan areas. With a broader interpretation of the right to an abortion, it would be possible to require all new obstetricians to be in favor of abortion rights, lest as professionals they employ conscience clauses and refuse to perform abortions. In the 1989 decision of Webster v. Reproductive Health Services, the Supreme Court ruled against an affirmative right to nontherapeutic abortions and noted that states would not be required to pay for them.

Some in academia have equated the denial of abortion rights to compulsory motherhood, and reason that because of this abortion bans violate the Thirteenth Amendment: "When women are compelled to carry and bear children, they are subjected to 'involuntary servitude' in violation of the Thirteenth Amendment. Even if the woman has stipulated to have consented to the risk of pregnancy, that does not permit the state to force her to remain pregnant." In 1993, a district court rejected an attempt to justify abortion rights apart from Roe and instead upon the basis that pregnancy and childrearing constituted involuntary servitude.

==== Opposition to both Roe and abortion rights ====
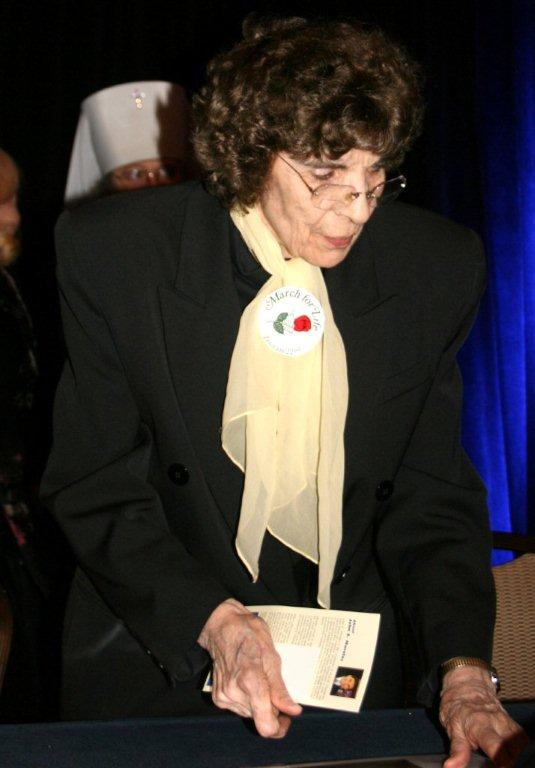
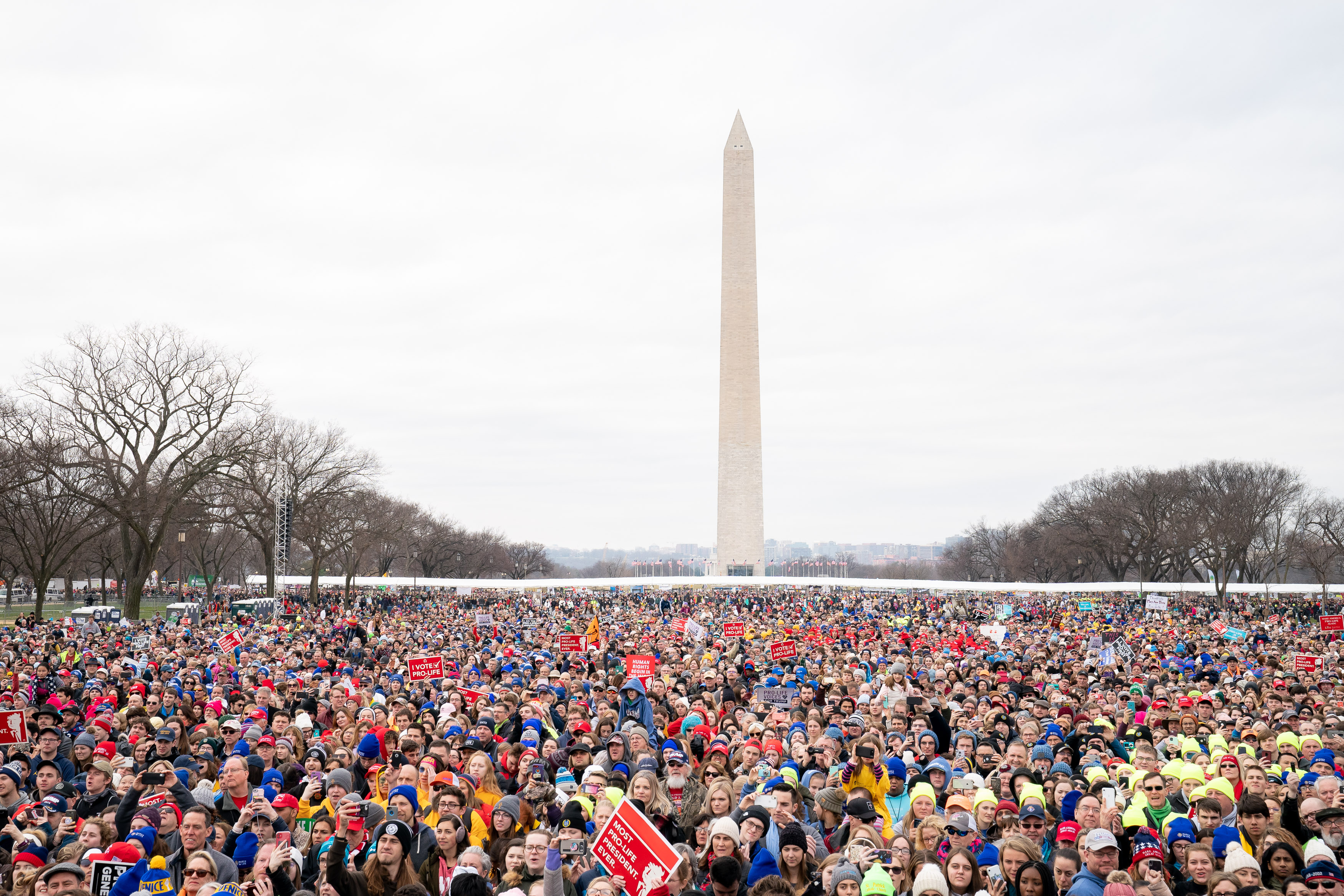
Nellie Gray (left) started March for Life to overturn Roe v. Wade. On right, the rally in 2020.

Every year, on the anniversary of the decision, opponents of abortion march up Constitution Avenue to the Supreme Court Building in Washington, D.C., in the March for Life. About 250,000 people attended the march until 2010. Estimates put the 2011 and 2012 attendances at 400,000 each, and the 2013 March for Life drew an estimated 650,000 people. The march was started in October 1973 by Nellie Gray and the first march took place on January 22, 1974, to mark the first anniversary of Roe v. Wade.

Opponents of Roe say that the decision lacks a valid constitutional foundation. Like the dissenters in Roe, they maintain that the Constitution is silent on the issue, and that proper solutions to the question would best be found via state legislatures and the legislative process, rather than through an all-encompassing ruling from the Supreme Court. Another argument against the Roe decision, as articulated by former president Ronald Reagan, is that, in the absence of consensus about when meaningful life begins, it is best to avoid the risk of doing harm.

In response to Roe v. Wade, most states enacted or attempted to enact laws limiting or regulating abortion, such as laws requiring parental consent or parental notification for minors to obtain abortions; spousal mutual consent laws; spousal notification laws; laws requiring abortions to be performed in hospitals, not clinics; laws barring state funding for abortions; laws banning intact dilation and extraction, also known as partial-birth abortion; laws requiring waiting periods before abortions; and laws mandating that women read certain types of literature and watch a fetal ultrasound before undergoing an abortion. In 1976, Congress passed the Hyde Amendment, barring the federal government from using Medicaid to fund abortions except in cases of rape, incest, or a threat to the life of the mother. The Supreme Court struck down some state restrictions in a long series of cases stretching from the mid-1970s to the late 1980s, but upheld restrictions on funding, including the Hyde Amendment, in the case of Harris v. McRae (1980). Some opponents of abortion maintain that personhood begins at fertilization or conception, and should therefore be protected by the Constitution; the dissenting justices in Roe instead wrote that decisions about abortion "should be left with the people and to the political processes the people have devised to govern their affairs."

=== Responses within the legal profession ===
Liberal and feminist legal scholars have had various reactions to Roe, not always giving the decision unqualified support. One argument is that Justice Blackmun reached the correct result but went about it the wrong way. Another is that the end achieved by Roe does not justify its means of judicial fiat.

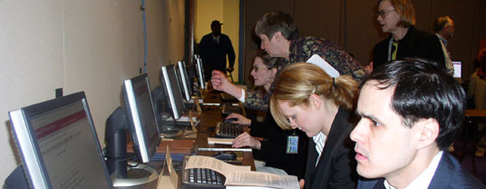
In 1997, Justice Blackmun (grave, left) gave his papers to the Library of Congress under terms concerning when his papers, including notes tracing the development of the Roe opinion, would be released. To accommodate demand on the day of the final release to the general public five years after his death, the library set up a temporary media center with 18 workstations. The two employees in the foreground are from CNN.

David Garrow said that the decision in Roe and also Doe v. Bolton "owed a great amount of their substance and language" to Justice Blackmun's law clerks, George Frampton and Randall Bezanson. He thought the extent of their contributions were remarkable, and that the clerks exhibited an "unusually assertive and forceful manner" in voicing their views to Justice Blackmun. In his research, it was the earliest significant example he found of this behavior pattern, which grew more consistent later on. In Garrow's evaluation, the clerks' contributions were "historically significant and perhaps decisive" in shaping the two decisions.

In response to Garrow, Edward Lazarus said that Justice Blackmun's later clerks like himself did not need as much direction on reproductive rights since they had Justice Blackmun's prior opinions to draw from. Lazarus thought that on at least some occasions when legal formulations were created for opinions to be published in Justice Blackmun's name, the justice himself was not engaged in originating every significant thought pattern that they employed. Lazarus agreed that Garrow's depiction of how the trimester framework came about was an example of one of these occasions. He concluded: "The problem of excessive clerk delegation was less serious in Blackmun's chambers than Garrow suggests but is also more commonplace among the justices. The modern Supreme Court has deep problems in its decisional culture and the overuse of law clerks is an aspect of this."

Justice John Paul Stevens, while agreeing with the decision, suggested that it should have been more narrowly focused on the issue of privacy. According to Stevens, if the decision had avoided the trimester framework and simply stated that the right to privacy included a right to choose abortion, "it might have been much more acceptable" from a legal standpoint. Before joining the Court, Justice Ruth Bader Ginsburg criticized the decision for venturing "too far in the change it ordered". Had the decision been limited in scope to only permit abortion during certain circumstances, "physicians might have been less pleased with the decision, but the legislative trend might have continued in the direction in which it was headed". After becoming a Supreme Court justice, Ginsburg faulted the Court's approach for being "about a doctor's freedom to practice his profession as he thinks best ... It wasn't woman-centered. It was physician-centered." Justice Ginsburg thought that Roe was originally intended to complement Medicaid funding for abortions, but this did not happen. About Harris v. McRae, which upheld restrictions on Medicaid abortion funding, she said:

Yes, the ruling about that surprised me. Frankly I had thought that at the time Roe was decided, there was concern about population growth and particularly growth in populations that we don't want to have too many of. So that Roe was going to be then set up for Medicaid funding for abortion. Which some people felt would risk coercing women into having abortions when they didn't really want them. But when the court decided McRae, the case came out the other way. And then I realized that my perception of it had been altogether wrong.

Watergate prosecutor Archibald Cox thought the "failure to confront the issue in principled terms leaves the opinion to read like a set of hospital rules and regulations whose validity is good enough this week but will be destroyed with new statistics upon the medical risks of child birth and abortion or new advances in providing for the separate existence of a fetus. Neither historian, nor layman, nor lawyer will be persuaded that all the prescriptions of Justice Blackmun are part of the Constitution."

In a highly cited Yale Law Journal article published in the months after the decision, the American legal scholar John Hart Ely criticized Roe as a decision that was disconnected from American constitutional law.

What is frightening about Roe is that this super-protected right is not inferable from the language of the Constitution, the framers' thinking respecting the specific problem in issue, any general value derivable from the provisions they included, or the nation's governmental structure. ... The problem with Roe is not so much that it bungles the question it sets itself, but rather that it sets itself a question the Constitution has not made the Court's business. ... [Roe] is bad because it is bad constitutional law, or rather because it is not constitutional law and gives almost no sense of an obligation to try to be.

American constitutional law scholar Laurence Tribe said: "One of the most curious things about Roe is that, behind its own verbal smokescreen, the substantive judgment on which it rests is nowhere to be found." Centrist-liberal law professors Alan Dershowitz, Cass Sunstein, and Kermit Roosevelt III have also expressed disappointment with Roe v. Wade.

Jeffrey Rosen, as well as Michael Kinsley, echo Ginsburg, arguing that a legislative movement would have been the correct way to build a more durable consensus in support of abortion rights. William Saletan wrote, "Blackmun's papers vindicate every indictment of Roe: invention, overreach, arbitrariness, textual indifference." Benjamin Wittes argued that Roe "disenfranchised millions of conservatives on an issue about which they care deeply." Edward Lazarus, a former Blackmun clerk who "loved Roe's author like a grandfather", wrote: "As a matter of constitutional interpretation and judicial method, Roe borders on the indefensible. ... Justice Blackmun's opinion provides essentially no reasoning in support of its holding. And in the almost 30 years since Roe's announcement, no one has produced a convincing defense of Roe on its own terms."

Richard Epstein thought that the majority opinion relied on a book written by William Lloyd Prosser about tort law when it stated that it "is said" recovery of damages was allowed "only if the fetus was viable, or at least quick, when the injuries were sustained". He compared this to what was in fact written in the book, which was that "when actually faced with the issue for decision, almost all of the jurisdictions have allowed recovery even though the injury occurred during the early weeks of pregnancy, when the child was neither viable nor quick."

Matt Bruenig, lawyer and founder of the People's Policy Project, criticized Roe as being "weaker than normal" and observed that similarly broad interpretations of the Constitution could be used to argue the opposite outcome, saying "right now we have a constitutional right to an abortion—you could also constitutionally ban abortion. If you wanted to, someone could bring a case, file it in a district court, hit the appeal button twice, and then if you get five judges together, the opinion would be the easiest thing in the world to write. You would say, 'the Fourteenth Amendment protects the right to life, liberty, and property without due process and all that shit. So we're looking at that, and we think that abortion takes a life and so we think that in fact states may not permit abortion'. So you could constitutionally ban it and say that no state or federal government is allowed to legalize abortion".

The assertion that the Supreme Court was making a legislative decision is often repeated by opponents of the ruling. The "viability" criterion was still in effect, although the point of viability changed as medical science found ways to help premature babies survive.

=== Later responses by those involved ===
==== Harry Blackmun ====
Justice Blackmun, who authored the Roe decision, subsequently had mixed feelings about his role in the case. During a 1974 television interview, he stated that Roe "will be regarded as one of the worst mistakes in the court's history or one of its great decisions, a turning point."

In a 1983 interview for a newspaper journalist, he responded that he was "mildly annoyed at those, law professors included, who personalize it" because "it was a decision of the court, not my decision. There were seven votes." As a Methodist, he felt hurt that Methodist pastors wrote condemning letters to him, but as time passed, the letters did not hurt "as much anymore". In defense he responded, "People misunderstand. I am not for abortion. I hope my family never has to face such a decision", noting that "I still think it was a correct decision" because "we were deciding a constitutional issue, not a moral one." He described Roe as "a no-win case" and predicted that, "fifty years from now, depending on the fate of the proposed constitutional amendment, abortion probably will not be as great a legal issue. I think it will continue to be a moral issue, however." He reflected that his role in the decision meant he was most known as the "author of the abortion decision". His response was that "we all pick up tags. I'll carry this one to my grave" and "so be it".

In 1987, Justice Blackmun explained in a letter to Chief Justice Rehnquist:

I remember that the old Chief appointed a screening committee, chaired by Potter, to select those cases that could (it was assumed) be adequately heard by a Court of seven. I was on that little committee. We did not do a good job. Potter pressed for Roe v. Wade and Doe v. Bolton to be heard and did so in the misapprehension that they involved nothing more than an application of Younger v. Harris. How wrong we were.

In a 1991 televised interview, he regretted the Court's decision to hear Roe and Doe: "It was a serious mistake ... We did a poor job. I think the committee should have deferred them until we had a full Court."

In 1992, he stood by the analytical framework he established in Roe during the subsequent Casey case. He often gave speeches and lectures promoting Roe v. Wade and criticizing Roe's critics.

==== Norma McCorvey ====
A few years after the Supreme Court decided Roe, Norma McCorvey made a claim—which she recanted many years later—that she had a nightmare about "little babies lying around with daggers in their hearts". She said this was the first of recurring nightmares that kept her awake at night. She became worried and wondered, "What really, had I done?" and "Well, how do they kill a baby inside a mother's stomach anyway?" McCorvey later claimed:

I couldn't get the thought out of my mind. I realize it sounds very naïve, especially for a woman who had already conceived and delivered three children. Though I had seen and experienced more than my share of the world, there were some things about which I still didn't have a clue—and this was one of them. Ironically enough, Jane Roe may have known less about abortion than anyone else.

McCorvey joined and accompanied others in the anti-abortion movement. During this time, McCorvey said that she had publicly lied about being raped and apologized for making the false claim. Norma McCorvey became part of the movement against abortion from 1995 until shortly before her death in 2017. In 1998, she testified to Congress:

It was my pseudonym, Jane Roe, which had been used to create the "right" to abortion out of legal thin air. But Sarah Weddington and Linda Coffee never told me that what I was signing would allow women to come up to me 15, 20 years later and say, "Thank you for allowing me to have my five or six abortions. Without you, it wouldn't have been possible." Sarah never mentioned women using abortions as a form of birth control. We talked about truly desperate and needy women, not women already wearing maternity clothes.

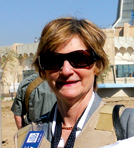
Judge Edith Jones

In 2002, along with Sandra Cano (Mary Doe) from Doe v. Bolton and Bernard Nathanson, a co-founder of NARAL Pro-Choice America, McCorvey appeared in a television advertisement intended to persuade the Bush administration to nominate Supreme Court Justices who would oppose abortion.

As a party to the original litigation, she sought to reopen the case in U.S. District Court in Texas to have Roe v. Wade overturned. However, the Fifth Circuit decided that her case was moot, in McCorvey v. Hill. In a concurring opinion, Judge Edith Jones agreed that McCorvey was raising legitimate questions about emotional and other harm suffered by women who have had abortions, about increased resources available for the care of unwanted children, and about new scientific understanding of fetal development. However, Jones said she was compelled to agree that the case was moot. On February 22, 2005, the Supreme Court refused to grant a writ of certiorari, and McCorvey's appeal ended.

In an interview shortly before her death, McCorvey stated that she had taken an anti-abortion position because she had been paid to do so and that her campaign against abortion had been an act. She also stated that it did not matter to her if women wanted to have an abortion and they should be free to choose. Rob Schenck, a Methodist pastor and activist who once had anti-abortion views stated that he and others helped entice McCorvey to claim she changed sides and also stated that what they had done with her was "highly unethical" and he had "profound regret" over the matter.

Frank Pavone, a priest with whom McCorvey talked after the interview, reflected after her death that "There was no indication whatsoever, at the end of her life," that she had given up her pro-life positions. Pavone stated that following the interview, McCorvey talked positively with him about a message she wanted him to convey at the next March for Life. The message concerned encouraging young people to oppose abortion.

==== Sarah Weddington ====
After arguing in Roe v. Wade at the age of 26, Sarah Weddington was elected to the Texas House of Representatives for three terms. Weddington also was general counsel for the U.S. Department of Agriculture, an assistant to President Jimmy Carter, lecturer at the Texas Wesleyan University School of Law, and speaker and adjunct professor at the University of Texas at Austin.

In a 1993 speech for the Institute for Educational Ethics in Oklahoma, Weddington discussed her conduct during Roe and stated, "My conduct may not have been totally ethical. But I did it for what I thought were good reasons."

In 1998, she said that the lack of doctors to abort fetuses could undermine Roe: "When I look back on the decision, I thought these words had been written in granite. But I've learned it was not granite. It was more like sandstone. The immediate problem is, where will the doctors come from?" Weddington died on December 26, 2021.

== Subsequent judicial developments ==
Roe was embedded in a long line of cases concerning personal liberty in the realm of privacy, since Roe was based on individual liberty cases concerning privacy like Meyer v. Nebraska (1923), Griswold v. Connecticut (1965), Loving v. Virginia (1967) and Eisenstadt v. Baird (1972) and became a foundation for individual liberty cases concerning privacy like Lawrence v. Texas (2003) and Obergefell v. Hodges (2015).

Two of the cases Justice Marshall discussed in his Rodriguez dissent

Two months after the decision in Roe, the Court issued a ruling about school funding in San Antonio Independent School District v. Rodriguez. The majority opinion cited Roe v. Wade to assert that privacy itself was a fundamental right, while procreation implicitly counted as "among the rights of personal privacy protected under the Constitution." In his dissenting opinion, Justice Thurgood Marshall stated that Roe v. Wade "reaffirmed its initial decision in Buck v. Bell", and noted where Buck was cited in Roe. He found Roe to be a continuation of the Court's practice of granting only a limited stature to the right to procreate, since the Court's decision treated procreation as less important than the right to privacy. He observed that although past decisions showed strong concern against the state discriminating against certain groups concerning procreation and certain other rights, the "Court has never said or indicated that these are interests which independently enjoy full-blown constitutional protection." Instead, in Roe, "the importance of procreation has indeed been explained on the basis of its intimate relationship with the constitutional right of privacy ..." Justice Marshall thought that the method used in Rodriguez for determining which rights were more fundamental was wrong, and proposed a different method which would result in procreation receiving greater legal protection.

The legal interaction between Roe v Wade, the Fourteenth Amendment as understood post-Roe, and changing medical technology and standards caused the development of civil suits for wrongful birth and wrongful life claims. Not all states permit a parent to sue for wrongful birth or a child to sue for wrongful life. The constitutionality of wrongful life claims is controversial within the legal profession, even for states which currently allow them. Pre-Roe, a state court dismissed a lawsuit making both a wrongful birth and life claim, which was unsuccessfully appealed to the Supreme Court of New Jersey.

Prior to Roe, the Chancery Division of the Superior Court of New Jersey found that a pregnant Jehovah's Witness woman could be ordered to submit to lifesaving blood transfusions due to the state's compelling interest "to save her life and the life of her unborn child." The Court appointed a legal guardian to represent the unborn child, and ordered the guardian to consent to blood transfusions and to "seek such other relief as may be necessary to preserve the lives of the mother and the child". After Roe, the Fifth District Appellate Court in Illinois ruled that medical professionals had wrongly transfused blood into a pregnant Jehovah's Witness woman on the basis from Roe that the "state's important and legitimate interest becomes compelling at viability" and her fetus was not yet viable.

President Reagan, who supported legislative restrictions on abortion, began making federal judicial appointments in 1981. Reagan denied that there was any litmus test: "I have never given a litmus test to anyone that I have appointed to the bench ... . I feel very strongly about those social issues, but I also place my confidence in the fact that the one thing that I do seek are judges that will interpret the law and not write the law. We've had too many examples in recent years of courts and judges legislating."

In addition to Justices White and Rehnquist, Reagan-appointed Justice Sandra Day O'Connor began dissenting from the Court's abortion cases, arguing in 1983 that the trimester-based analysis devised by the Roe Court was "unworkable." Shortly before his retirement, Chief Justice Warren Burger suggested in 1986 that Roe be "reexamined"; the associate justice who filled Burger's place on the Court—Justice Antonin Scalia—vigorously opposed Roe. Concern about overturning Roe played a major role in the defeat of Robert Bork's nomination to the Court in 1987; the man eventually appointed to replace Roe-supporter Justice Lewis Powell was Justice Anthony Kennedy.

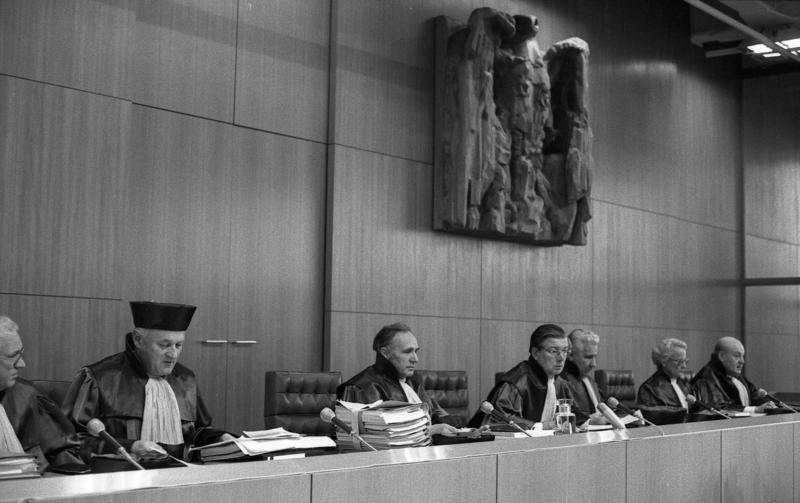
Oral hearing for the German Constitutional Court's abortion decision, November 18, 1974

The justices voting in the majority on the Federal Constitutional Court in pre-unification West Germany rejected the trimester framework in the German Constitutional Court abortion decision, 1975 on the basis that development during pregnancy is a continuous whole rather than made up of three trimesters. The Court found that the right to life extends also to the unborn and that life begins on the fourteenth day after conception. It also found that the liberties of pregnant mothers were qualified by the existence of another life inside them. The Court found that "A compromise which guarantees the protection of the life of the one about to be born and permits the pregnant woman the freedom of abortion is not possible since the interruption of pregnancy always means the destruction of the unborn life." It ruled that the fetus must be protected, and the first responsibility for this lies with the mother, with a second responsibility in the hands of the legislature. The Court allowed for a balancing of rights between the mother and unborn child, but required that the rights of each be considered within a framework which acknowledged the supreme, fundamental value of human life. Legislation allowing abortion could be constitutional if the rights of the unborn persons were acknowledged in this manner.

Two minority justices in the ruling for the German Constitutional Court abortion decision in 1975 remarked that "the Supreme Court of the United States has even regarded punishment for the interruption of pregnancy, performed by a physician with the consent of the pregnant woman in the first third of pregnancy, as a violation of fundamental rights. This would, according to German constitutional law, go too far indeed."

In 1988, the Supreme Court of Canada used the rulings in both Roe and Doe v. Bolton as grounds to find Canada's federal law limiting abortions to certified hospitals unconstitutional in R. v. Morgentaler.

=== Planned Parenthood v. Danforth ===
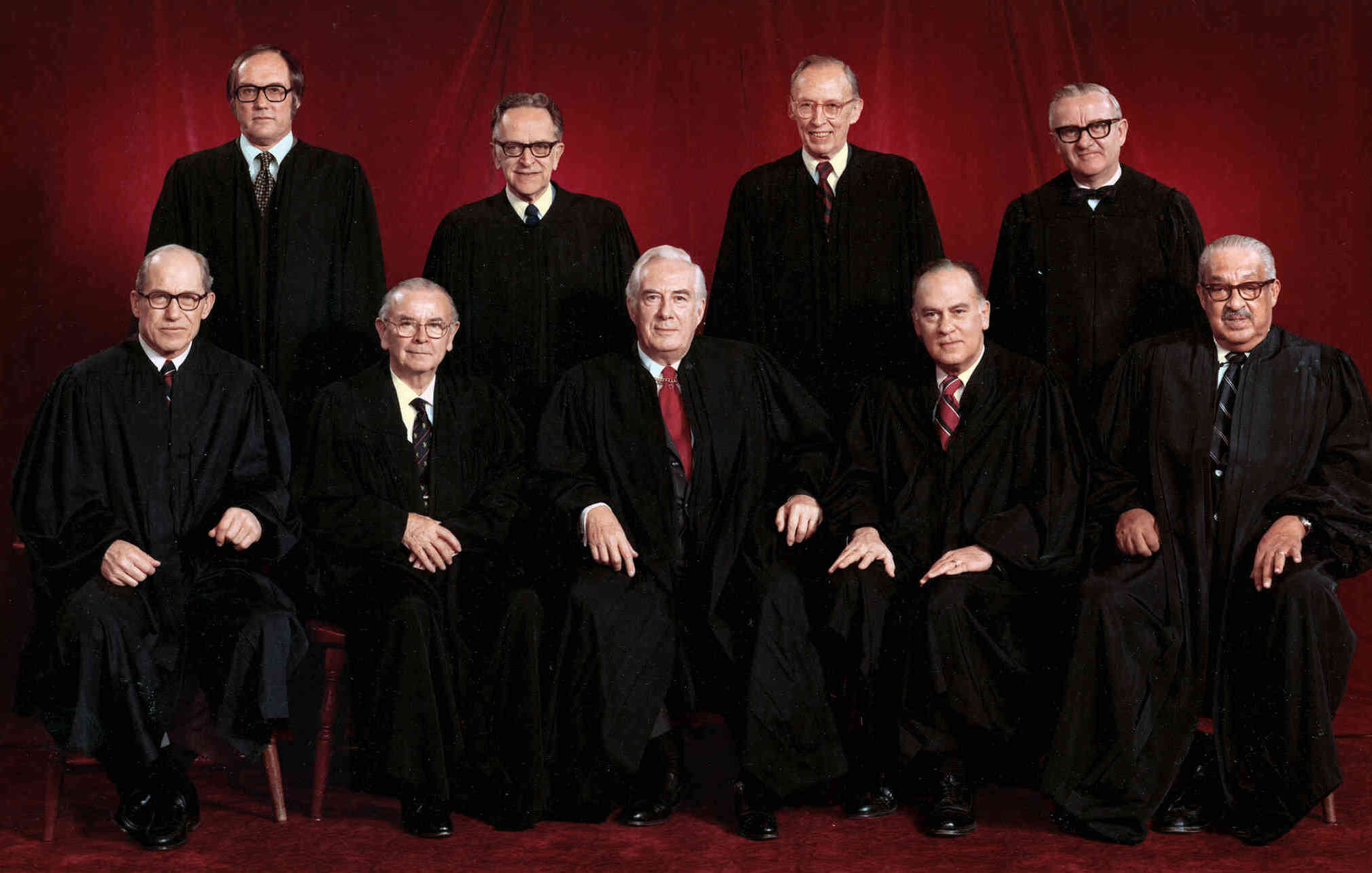
Burger Court in 1976

In Planned Parenthood v. Danforth, 428 U.S. 52 (1976), the plaintiffs challenged a Missouri statute which regulated abortion. In the regulations for abortions on demand, the state required prior written consent from a parent if the patient was a minor or a spouse if the patient was married. For pregnancies at 12 weeks and later, the statute also banned saline abortions, in which chemicals are injected into the amniotic sac to burn the fetus. The portions of the statute involving parental or spousal consent and prohibiting saline abortions were struck down.

=== Floyd v. Anders ===
In Floyd v. Anders, 440 F. Supp. 535 (D.S.C. 1977), South Carolina attempted to prosecute a doctor for illegal abortion and murder after he attempted to abort an African American boy at 25 weeks. During the abortion, the boy was born alive and survived for 20 days before dying. His prosecution was blocked by Judge Clement Haynsworth, and shortly afterwards by a unanimous three judge panel for the U.S. District Court for the District of South Carolina. Judge Haynsworth, writing for the panel, stated "Indeed, the Supreme Court declared the fetus in the womb is neither alive nor a person within the meaning of the Fourteenth Amendment." John T. Noonan criticized this from an anti-abortion perspective, stating that "Judge Haynsworth had replaced the Supreme Court's test of potential ability to live with a new test of actual ability to live indefinitely. He also had spelled out what was implied in Roe v. Wade but never actually stated there. For the American legal systems the fetus in the womb was not alive." The standard in Roe for viability outside the womb required a "capability of meaningful life". Without this capability, the state had no compelling "important and legitimate interest in potential life".

=== Webster v. Reproductive Health Services ===
In a 5–4 decision in 1989's Webster v. Reproductive Health Services, Chief Justice Rehnquist, writing for the Court, declined to explicitly overrule Roe, because "none of the challenged provisions of the Missouri Act properly before us conflict with the Constitution." In particular, the Court found that the ability to have a nontherapeutic abortion was not an affirmative right of the sort that required the state to pay for it. In this case, the Court upheld several abortion restrictions, and modified the Roe trimester framework.

In concurring opinions, Justice O'Connor refused to reconsider Roe, and Justice Antonin Scalia criticized the Court and Justice O'Connor for not overruling Roe. Justice Blackmun stated in his dissent that Justices White, Kennedy and Rehnquist were "callous" and "deceptive", that they deserved to be charged with "cowardice and illegitimacy", and that their plurality opinion "foments disregard for the law." White had recently opined that the majority reasoning in Roe v. Wade was "warped."

=== Planned Parenthood v. Casey ===
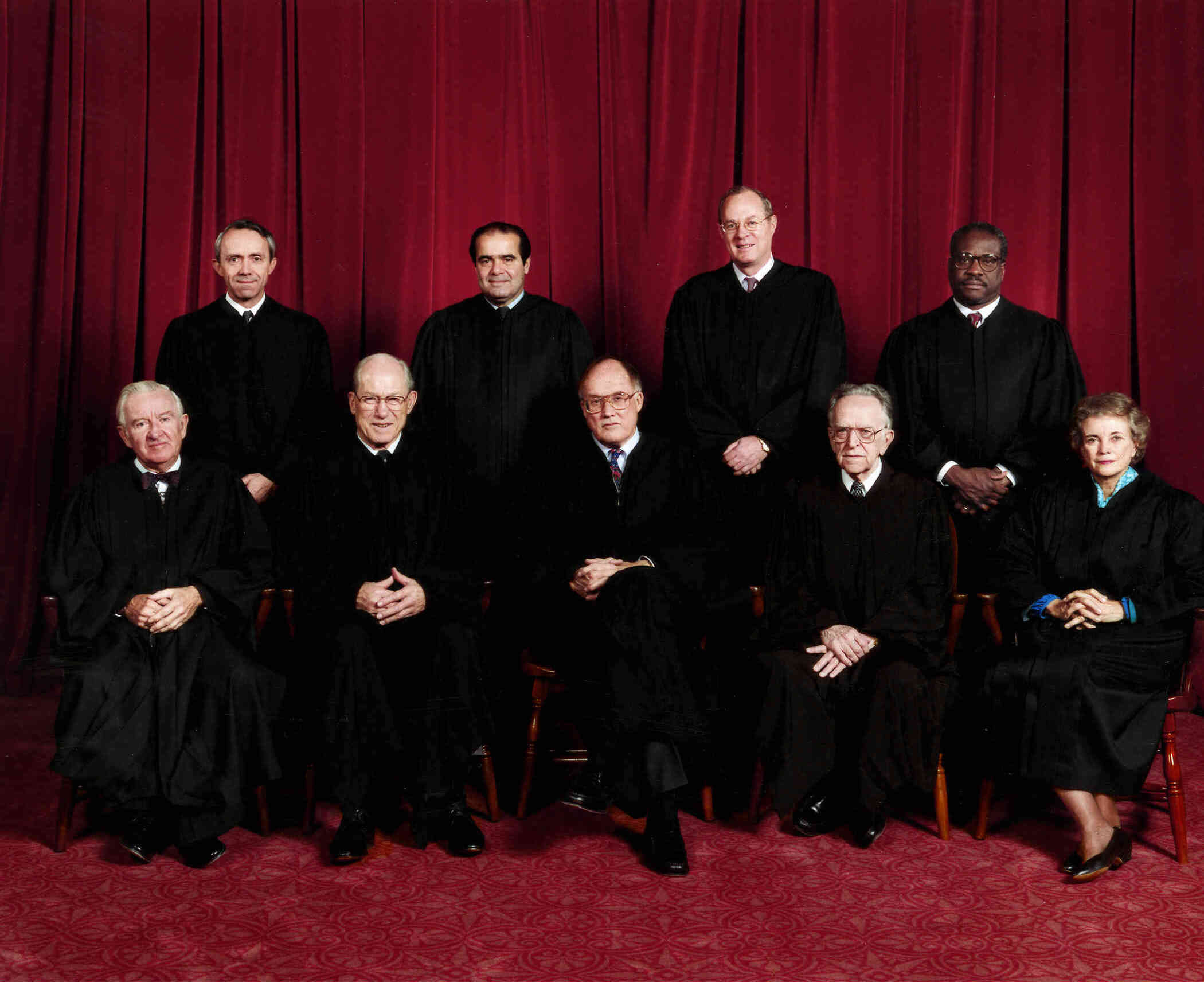
1991–1993 Rehnquist Court

During initial deliberations for Planned Parenthood v. Casey (1992), an initial majority of five justices (Rehnquist, White, Scalia, Kennedy, and Thomas) were willing to effectively overturn Roe. Justice Kennedy changed his mind after the initial conference, and Justices O'Connor, Kennedy, and Souter joined Justices Blackmun and Stevens to reaffirm the central holding of Roe, but instead of justifying the liberty to abort as being based on privacy as in Roe, it justified the liberty in a broader manner. The opinion asserted an individual's liberty to choose concerning family life and also protection from legal enforcement intended to maintain traditional sex roles, writing, "Our law affords constitutional protection to personal decisions relating to marriage, procreation, contraception, family relationships, child rearing, and education. ..." and against the state insisting "upon its own vision of the woman's role, however dominant that vision has been in the course of our history and our culture. The destiny of the woman must be shaped to a large extent on her own conception of her spiritual imperatives and her place in society."

The plurality of justices stated that abortion-related legislation should be reviewed based on the undue burden standard instead of the strict scrutiny standard from Roe.

The plurality also found that a fetus was now viable at 23 or 24 weeks rather than at the 28-week line from 1973. They also felt that fetal viability was "more workable" than the trimester framework. They abandoned the trimester framework due to two basic flaws: "in its formulation it misconceives the nature of the pregnant woman's interest; and in practice it undervalues the State's interest in potential life, as recognized in Roe." Only Justice Blackmun wanted to retain Roe entirely and issue a decision completely in favor of Planned Parenthood. Prior to this, he had considered a Pennsylvania viability-based law to be unconstitutionally vague in his majority opinion for Colautti v. Franklin.

Justice Scalia's dissent asserted that abortion is not a liberty protected by the Constitution for the same reason bigamy was not protected either: because the Constitution does not mention it, and because longstanding traditions have permitted it to be legally proscribed. He also asked:

Precisely why is it that, at the magical second when machines currently in use (though not necessarily available to the particular woman) are able to keep an unborn child alive apart from its mother, the creature is suddenly able (under our Constitution) to be protected by law, whereas before that magical second it was not? That makes no more sense than according infants legal protection only after the point when they can feed themselves.

=== Stenberg v. Carhart ===
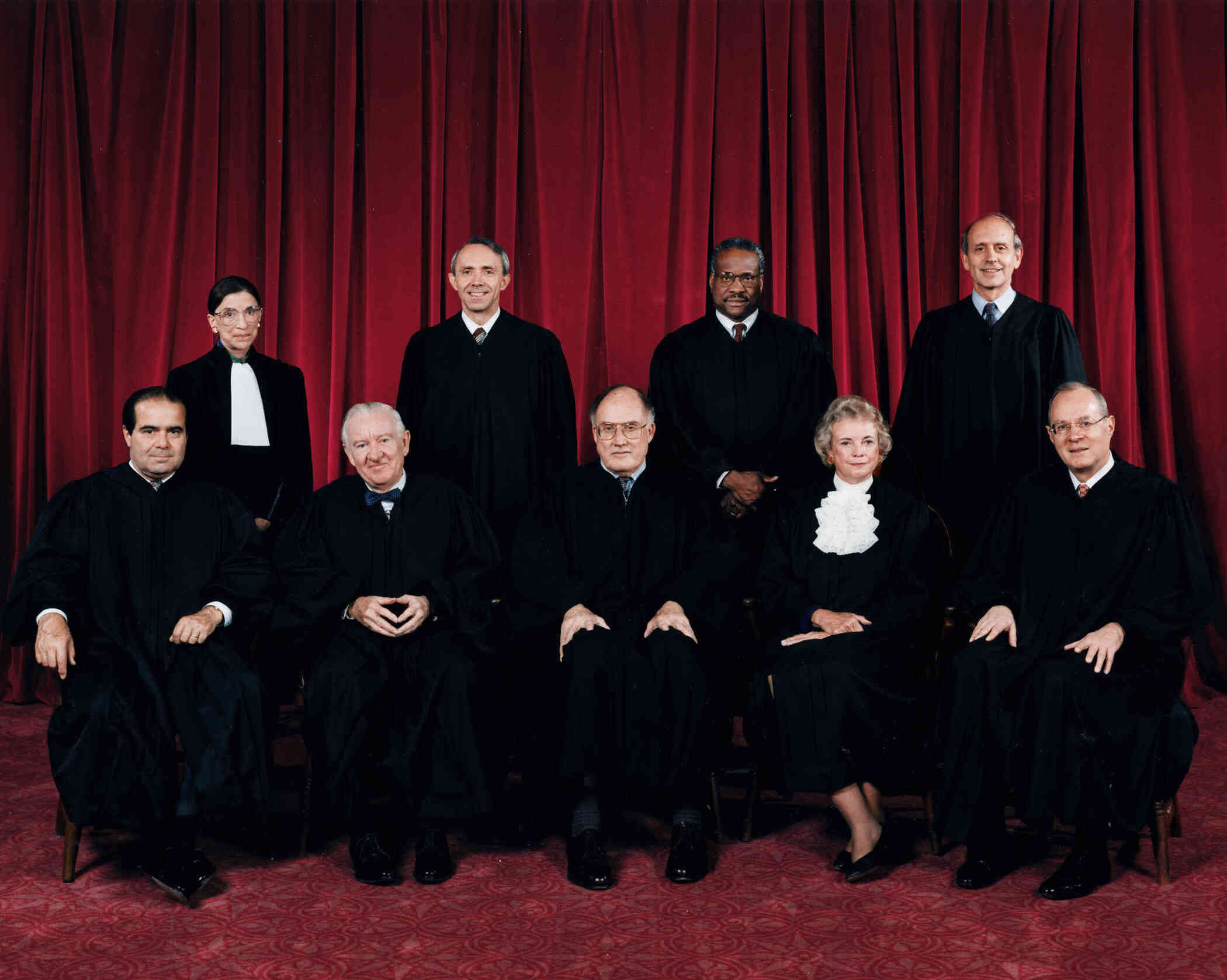
The Rehnquist Court in 1994; the members pictured are the ones who decided Stenberg v. Carhart. Justice Ginsburg replaced Justice White.

During the 1990s, Nebraska enacted a law banning partial-birth abortion. The law allowed another second-trimester abortion procedure known as dilation and evacuation. In 2000, the Supreme Court struck down the law by a 5–4 vote in Stenberg v. Carhart, with Justice Stephen Breyer writing for the majority that sometimes partial-birth abortion "would be the safest procedure". Justice O'Connor wrote a concurrence stating Nebraska was actually banning both abortion methods. Justices Ginsburg and Stevens joined each other's concurrences. Justice Stevens stated that "the notion that either of these two equally gruesome procedures performed at this late stage of gestation is more akin to infanticide than the other ... is simply irrational." Justice Ginsburg stated that the "law does not save any fetus from destruction, for it targets only 'a method of performing abortion'."

Justice Thomas's dissent stated, "The 'partial birth' gives the fetus an autonomy which separates it from the right of the woman to choose treatments for her own body." Justice Scalia joined Justice Thomas's dissent and also wrote his own, stating that partial-birth abortion is "so horrible that the most clinical description of it evokes a shudder of revulsion" and that this case proved Casey was "unworkable". Chief Justice Rehnquist joined the two dissents by Justices Scalia and Thomas.

Justice Kennedy, who had co-authored Casey, dissented in Stenberg. He described in graphic detail exactly how a fetus dies while being dismembered during a dilation and evacuation procedure. He reasoned that since Nebraska was not seeking to prohibit it, the state was free to ban partial-birth abortion.

=== Gonzales v. Carhart ===
In 2003, Congress passed the Partial-Birth Abortion Ban Act, which led to a lawsuit in the case of Gonzales v. Carhart. The Court previously ruled in Stenberg v. Carhart that a state's ban on partial-birth abortion was unconstitutional because such a ban did not have an exception for the health of the woman. The membership of the Court changed after Stenberg, with Chief Justice John Roberts and Justice Samuel Alito replacing Chief Justice Rehnquist and Justice O'Connor. The ban at issue in Gonzales v. Carhart was similar to the one in Stenberg, but had been adjusted to comply with the Court's ruling.

On April 18, 2007, a 5 to 4 decision upheld the constitutionality of the Partial-Birth Abortion Ban Act. Justice Kennedy wrote the majority opinion that Congress was within its power to ban partial-birth abortion. The Court left the door open for as-applied challenges. The opinion did not address whether Casey remained valid. Instead it only assumed Casey was valid "for the purposes of this opinion".

Chief Justice John Roberts and Justices Scalia, Thomas, and Alito joined the majority. Justice Thomas filed a concurring opinion, joined by Justice Scalia, contending that the Court's prior decisions in Roe v. Wade and Planned Parenthood v. Casey should be reversed. They also noted that the Partial-Birth Abortion Ban Act may have exceeded the powers of Congress under the Commerce Clause but that the question was not raised.

Justice Ginsburg, joined by Justices Stevens, Souter, and Breyer, dissented, contending that the ruling ignored precedent and that abortion rights should instead be justified by equality.

=== Dubay v. Wells ===
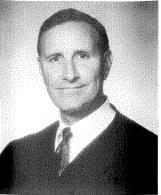
Judge David Lawson

Dubay v. Wells was a 2006 paternity case where a man argued he should not have to pay child support for a child he did not want to parent. The case was billed as "Roe v. Wade for men".

On March 9, 2006, Dubay filed a lawsuit before the United States District Court for the Eastern District of Michigan. Michigan's Attorney General, Joel D. McGormley, made a motion to have the case dismissed. On July 17, 2006, District Court Judge David Lawson agreed and dismissed Dubay's lawsuit. He appealed it once, to the United States Court of Appeals for the Sixth Circuit, which also dismissed it, and stated:

Dubay's claim that a man's right to disclaim fatherhood would be analogous to a woman's right to abortion rests upon a false analogy. In the case of a father seeking to opt out of fatherhood and thereby avoid child support obligations, the child is already in existence and the state therefore has an important interest in providing for his or her support.

=== Whole Woman's Health v. Hellerstedt ===
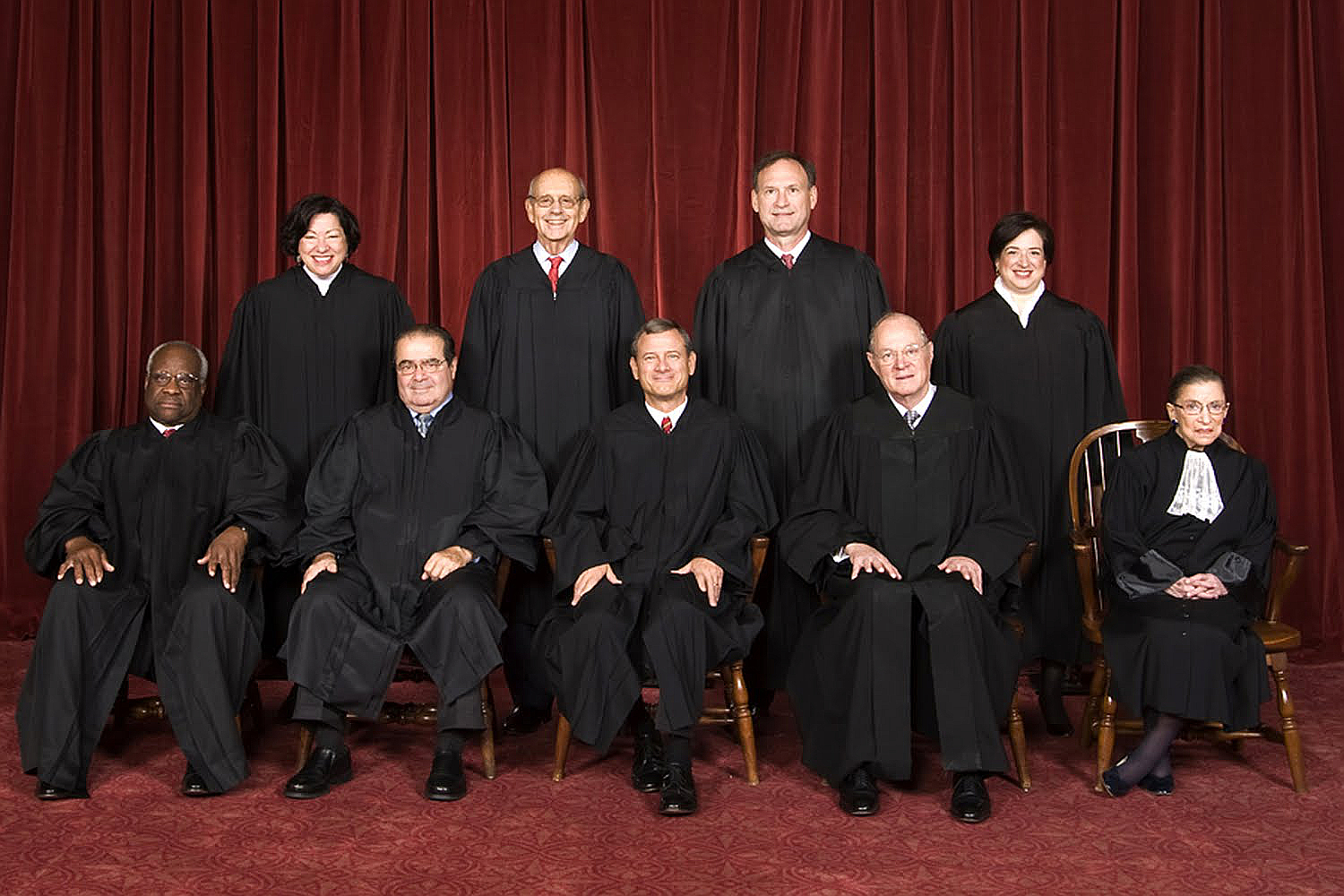
The Roberts Court in 2010; eight of the nine members pictured are the ones who decided Whole Woman's Health v. Hellerstedt. Justice Scalia (front row, second left) died before the oral argument.

In 2013, the Texas legislature enacted restrictions which required abortion doctors to have admitting privileges at a local hospital and required abortion clinics to have facilities equivalent to others which conducted outpatient surgery. On June 27, 2016, the Supreme Court in a 5–3 decision for Whole Woman's Health v. Hellerstedt struck down these restrictions.

The majority opinion by Justice Breyer struck down these two provisions of Texas law in a facial manner—that is, the very words of the provisions were invalid, no matter how they might be applied in any practical situation. The ruling also stated that the task of judging whether a law puts an undue burden on a woman's right to abortion belongs with the courts and not the legislatures.

=== Box v. Planned Parenthood ===
In 2016, Indiana passed House Bill 1337, enacting a law which regulated what is done with fetal remains and banning abortion for sexist, racist, or ableist purposes. In its unsigned 2019 ruling for Box v. Planned Parenthood of Indiana and Kentucky, Inc., the U.S. Supreme Court upheld the regulations about fetal remains, but declined to hear the remainder of the law, which had been blocked by lower courts. Justice Ginsburg dissented from the part of the ruling about fetal remains on the basis that the regulations violated Casey. She also criticized Justice Thomas over his use of the word "mother" in his concurrence.

Justice Sotomayor stated that she wished the Court would not have heard the case at all. Justice Thomas wrote a concurring opinion which expressed concern that the theory presented in Freakonomics echoed the views of the eugenics movement. He warned that "a constitutional right to an abortion based solely on the race, sex, or disability of an unborn child, as Planned Parenthood advocates, would constitutionalize the views of the 20th-century eugenics movement". He predicted, "Although the Court declines to wade into these issues today, we cannot avoid them forever."

=== Whole Woman's Health v. Jackson ===
In 2021, the state of Texas devised a legal workaround to Roe that allowed it to successfully outlaw abortion at six weeks of pregnancy despite the continued existence of Roe and Casey. In the Texas Heartbeat Act, the legislature created a novel enforcement mechanism that bars state officials from enforcing the statute and authorizes private individuals to sue anyone who performs or assists an illegal abortion. Because the Act is enforced by private citizens rather than government officials, there are no state officials that abortion providers can sue to stop the enforcement of the law, and they cannot obtain judicial relief that will stop private lawsuits from being initiated against them. This has produced an end-run around Roe because the threat of private civil-enforcement lawsuits has forced abortion providers to comply with the Act despite its incompatibility with the Supreme Court's abortion pronouncements. Other states have copied this enforcement mechanism to sidestep Roe and immunize their anti-abortion statutes from judicial review. This maneuver has weakened Roe and undercut the federal judiciary's ability to protect abortion rights from state legislation.

=== Dobbs v. Jackson Women's Health Organization ===
Dobbs v. Jackson Women's Health Organization is a case that was a legal challenge to Mississippi's 2018 Gestational Age Act, which had banned abortions after 15 weeks with exceptions only for medical emergencies or fetal abnormalities. Federal courts had enjoined the state from enforcing the law after the state's only abortion clinic, Jackson Women's Health Organization, filed suit immediately after passage; the federal courts stated that the law violated the previously established 24-week point of viability. Mississippi asked the Supreme Court to hear the case on June 15, 2020, and the Court certified the petition on May 17, 2021, limited to the question, "Whether all pre-viability prohibitions on elective abortions are unconstitutional." The Court chose not to take up two other questions that Mississippi wanted to bring before the Court.

On May 2, 2022, Politico released a leaked first draft of a majority opinion written by Justice Samuel Alito, which had been circulated among the court in February 2022. Alito's draft wrote, "We hold that Roe and Casey must be overruled. It is time to heed the Constitution and return the issue of abortion to the people's elected representatives." The release of a draft opinion for a pending case was unprecedented in recent Supreme Court history. The document was not a final decision, and the justices were still able to change their votes. The document was thought to reflect both the justices' preliminary voting and the outcome of the internal Court procedure for deciding who is assigned to write the majority opinion. A press release from the Supreme Court confirmed the leaked document's authenticity, and Chief Justice John Roberts in a statement described its release as a "betrayal of the confidences of the Court". The leaked draft regarding the decision sparked protests.

On June 24, 2022, the Supreme Court ruled 6–3 to uphold Mississippi's Gestational Age Act, and 5–4 to overrule Roe and Casey. Similar to the leaked draft opinion, the opinion of the court written by Justice Alito stated that Roe was "egregiously wrong from the start" and its reasoning "exceptionally weak". It also stated that Roe has "enflamed debate and deepened division" and that overruling it would "return the issue of abortion to the people's elected representatives". The majority opinion relied on a constitutional historical view of abortion rights, saying, "The Constitution makes no reference to abortion, and no such right is implicitly protected by any constitutional provision." The reasoning was that "abortion couldn't be constitutionally protected. Until the latter part of the 20th century, such a right was entirely unknown in American law. Indeed, when the Fourteenth Amendment was adopted, three quarters of the States made abortion a crime at all stages of pregnancy." Some historians argued that this view is incomplete, with Leslie J. Reagan saying that Alito "speciously claims" the truth of his assertions. In their dissent, Justices Stephen Breyer, Elena Kagan, and Sonia Sotomayor jointly wrote, "The right Roe and Casey recognized does not stand alone. To the contrary, the Court has linked it for decades to other settled freedoms involving bodily integrity, familial relationships, and procreation. Most obviously, the right to terminate a pregnancy arose straight out of the right to purchase and use contraception. In turn, those rights led, more recently, to rights of same-sex intimacy and marriage. Either the mass of the majority's opinion is hypocrisy, or additional constitutional rights are under threat. It is one or the other."

== Role in politics ==
=== Presidential positions ===
Generally, presidential opinions following Roe have been split along major party lines. The decision has been opposed by presidents Gerald Ford, Ronald Reagan, George W. Bush, and Donald Trump. President George H. W. Bush also opposed Roe, though he had supported abortion rights earlier in his career.

President Richard Nixon appointed Justices Burger, Blackmun, and Powell who voted with the majority, and Justice Rehnquist who dissented. President Nixon did not publicly comment about Roe v. Wade.

During his early career, President Jimmy Carter supported legalizing abortion in order to save the life of a woman or in the event of birth defects, or in other extreme circumstances. As president, he thought abortion was wrong, but stated that he "accepted my obligation to enforce the Roe v. Wade Supreme Court ruling, and at the same time attempted in every way possible to minimize the number of abortions." In 2012 he reflected, "I never have believed that Jesus Christ would approve of abortions and that was one of the problems I had when I was president having to uphold Roe v. Wade ..." He urged the Democratic Party to take a position supporting pregnant mothers to minimize economic and social factors driving women to get abortions. He also wanted the party to take stand in favor of banning abortion except for those whose lives "are in danger or who are pregnant as a result of rape or incest."

Roe has received support from presidents Bill Clinton and Barack Obama. In 1981, then-Senator Joe Biden voted for a constitutional amendment allowing states to overturn Roe v. Wade, which he voted against the following year. In a 2007 memoir, Biden expressed an opinion that although he was "personally opposed to abortion" he did not have the "right to impose" his personal opposition onto others. In 2021, he described himself to reporters as "a strong supporter of Roe v. Wade", and added, "And I under—I respect people who think that—who don't support Roe v. Wade; I respect their views. I respect them—they—those who believe life begins at the moment of conception and all. I respect that. Don't agree, but I respect that. I'm not going to impose that on people."

=== Federal bills or laws regarding Roe ===
Federal bills, amendments, or laws regarding Roe include the Women's Health Protection Act, Freedom of Choice Act, Partial-Birth Abortion Ban Act, Born-Alive Infants Protection Act, Unborn Victims of Violence Act, Interstate Abortion Bill, No Taxpayer Funding for Abortion Act, Pain-Capable Unborn Child Protection Act, Partial-Birth Abortion Ban Act of 1995, Sanctity of Human Life Act, Sanctity of Life Act, Hyde Amendment, Freedom of Access to Clinic Entrances Act, and the Baby Doe Law.

Following the passage of the Texas Heartbeat Act and the Supreme Court's acceptance of the Dobbs v. Jackson Women's Health Organization case, and the threat the case poses to Roe in the eyes of Roe supporters, Neal Kumar Katyal, a law professor and former acting solicitor general of the United States, said that instead of abortion regulation by the judicial branch, Congress could "codify the rights two generations have taken as part of American life", and "nullify the threat to reproductive health posed by the Mississippi case." Thomas Jipping of the Heritage Foundation wrote that the Women's Health Protection Act is unconstitutional because it regulates how state legislatures regulate abortion and abortion services rather than directly regulating abortion at the federal level. Views that the WHPA is unconstitutional or should otherwise be opposed were expressed during Senate Judiciary Committee hearings in 2014.

=== State laws regarding Roe ===
At the state level, there have been many laws about abortion. In the decade after Roe, most states passed laws protecting medical workers with a conscientious objection to abortion. Nine states which had legalized abortion or loosened abortion restrictions prior to Roe already had statutory protection for those who did not want to participate in or perform an abortion. As of 2011, forty-seven states and the District of Columbia had laws allowing certain people to decline to perform certain actions or provide information related to abortion or reproductive health. At the federal level, the Church Amendment of 1973 was proposed to protect private hospitals objecting to abortion from being deprived of funding. It first passed the Senate, 92–1, then a slightly modified version passed the House, 372–1, and the final bill which contained it passed the Senate 94–0. Justice Blackmun supported this and other regulations protecting individual physicians and entire hospitals operated by religious denominations.

Some states have passed laws to maintain the legality of abortion if Roe v. Wade is overturned. Those states include California, Connecticut, Hawaii, Maine, Maryland, Nevada, and Washington. Other states have enacted so-called trigger laws that would take effect in the event that Roe v. Wade is overturned, with the effect of outlawing abortions on the state level. Those states include Arkansas, Kentucky, Louisiana, Mississippi, North Dakota, and South Dakota. Additionally, many states did not repeal pre-1973 statutes against abortion, and some of those statutes could again be in force if Roe were reversed.

On April 16, 2012, Mississippi House Bill 1390 was signed into law. The law attempted to make abortion unfeasible without having to overturn Roe v. Wade. Judge Daniel Porter Jordan III of the United States District Court for the Southern District of Mississippi granted an injunction against the law on July 13, 2012. On April 15, 2013, he issued another injunction which only applied to a part of the law which required the individual performing the abortions to have hospital admitting privileges. On July 29, 2014, a three-judge panel from the U.S. Court of Appeals for the Fifth Circuit upheld the injunction against part of the law, with Judge Emilio M. Garza dissenting. The ruling especially relied on a case unrelated to Roe which was decided "nearly fifty years before the right to an abortion was found in the penumbras of the Constitution". On February 18, 2015, Mississippi asked the Supreme Court to hear the case, but they declined to hear it on June 28, 2016.

The Human Life Protection Act was signed by Alabama governor Kay Ivey on May 14, 2019, in hopes of challenging Roe v. Wade in the Supreme Court. It includes exceptions for a serious health risk to the mother or a lethal fetal anomaly, but otherwise it will make abortion a felony for the abortion doctor if it goes into effect. Women subjected to an abortion will not be criminally culpable or civilly liable under the law. On October 29, 2019, Judge Myron Thompson for the U.S. District Court for the Northern District of Alabama issued a preliminary injunction against the law.

In May 2021, Texas lawmakers passed Senate Bill 8, creating the Texas Heartbeat Act, banning abortions except in cases of medical emergency as soon as a fetal heartbeat can be detected. This is typically as early as six weeks into pregnancy and often before women know they are pregnant. The law established that any Texas resident who is not a state or local government employee or official can sue abortion clinics and doctors who are known to be "aiding and abetting" abortion procedures after six weeks. A clause forbids anyone who impregnated an abortion patient through rape, sexual assault, or incest to sue concerning the patient. The enactment date was September 1, 2021, and the U.S. Supreme Court, in a 5–4 decision, declined a request to block enforcement of the law that day. On October 22, 2021, the Court again did not block the law's enforcement, and agreed to hear arguments for United States v. Texas on November 1, 2021. They limited the question to a review of standing. On December 10, 2021, the Court dismissed the lawsuit on the basis that lower courts should not have accepted it. This decision allows lawsuits against the executive directors of Texas's medical, nursing, and pharmacy licensing boards and also against the executive commissioner of the Texas Health and Human Services Commission, but not certain other lawsuits seeking to overturn the law.

== Legacy ==
=== Effects of legalization ===
Roe v. Wade caused a 4.5% decline in births in states that had not previously legalized abortion. Although the legalization of abortion in the United States increased the labor supply of fertile-aged women in the workforce, it decreased the labor supply of older women. This is thought to be due to the fact they now had fewer opportunities to financially support grandchildren. Older women whose labors became less necessary for the family's financial wellbeing either left or stayed out of the workforce. Since Roe, the risk of death due to legal abortion fell considerably due to increased physician skills, improved medical technology, and earlier termination of pregnancy. Various studies have shown that overturning Roe could have adverse socio-economic conditions, higher maternal mortality, and other negative impacts.

The Donohue–Levitt hypothesis about the legalized abortion and crime effect proposed that legalized abortion was responsible for reductions in the crime rate. If there is a relationship between abortion and crime, there are several possibilities that could explain how abortion lowers crime. One possibility is that crime is disproportionally committed by young males, and legalizing abortion reduced the number of young males. Another possibility is that children born in the post-legalization era are less likely to commit crimes. If this is the case, it might be explained in two ways. One way is that the sort of women who have abortions are not representative of pregnant women as a whole; rather they are the sort who are most likely to give birth to children who grow up to be criminals. In this way, abortion serves to shape American family structure. Studies linking demographics to crime have found that children born to American teenagers, unmarried mothers, and mothers with lower incomes are more likely to engage in criminal activity as adolescents. Abortion rates are higher for these demographics. A second possible way to explain it is that women use abortion to prevent births until they are most able to provide a stable home environment. Factors involved in stability include the age, education, income, of the mother, her use of drugs and alcohol, the presence of a father, and wanted as opposed to unwanted pregnancies. Another hypothesis is the Roe effect, which tries to explain why the practice of abortion would eventually lead to abortion being restricted or outlawed. The hypothesis is that people in favor of abortion rights would not parent as many children when abortion is legal, and since children tend to have similar views to their parents eventually voters would not support abortion rights. Critics have argued that Donohue and Levitt's methodologies are flawed and that no statistically significant relationship between abortion and later crime rates can be proven.

=== Opinion polls ===
Into the 21st century, polls of Americans' opinions about abortion indicated they are about equally divided. Several organizations, among them Gallup, Pew Research Center, and Harris Insights & Analytics, conduct abortion or Roe v. Wade-related polls. Regarding the Roe decision as a whole, more Americans supported it than supported overturning it. In the 2000s, when pollsters describe various regulations that Roe prevented legislatures from enacting, support for Roe dropped.

Into the 2010s, poll results relating to abortion indicated nuance and frequently do not directly match up with respondents' self-identified political affiliations. In 2021, an ABC News/Washington Post poll found that 58% of those with children living at home wanted to see Roe v. Wade upheld, compared to 62% of those without children at home. An All in Together poll found that only 36% with children living in their house opposed the Texas Heartbeat Act, compared to 54.9% without children. After the Supreme Court's decision in June 2022 to overturn Roe v. Wade, a new CBC News/YouGov poll showed 59% disapprove of the decision, and of women polled, 67% disapprove. According to the same poll, 52% of the participants called the court's decision a "step backward" for America, 31% said it is a "step forward", and 17% say it was neither. A January 2023 Gallup poll found that nearly 7 in 10 Americans disapprove of the country's abortion policies, the highest rate in 23 years.

== See also ==
- Abortion law in the United States
- Abortion law in the United States by state
- Feticide § Laws in the United States
- Justifiable homicide § Common excusing conditions, sixth item listed
- List of United States Supreme Court cases by the Burger Court
- List of United States Supreme Court cases, volume 410
- List of United States Supreme Court leaks
- Roe vs. Wade (film), released in 1989
- Roe v. Wade (film), released in 2020
- Shelley Lynn Thornton, the "Roe baby"
