= Texas abortion statute =

Texas abortion statute (or statutes) may refer to one of these laws enacted by the Texas Legislature in the U.S. state of Texas:

- Texas abortion statutes (1961), portions of the 1961 Texas Penal Code which were held to be unconstitutional in the U.S. Supreme Court case Roe v. Wade (decided 1973)
- Texas Heartbeat Act, effective September 1, 2021, banning abortions after six weeks of pregnancy
