= Guilt =

Guilt often refers to:

- Guilt (emotion), emotions experienced when an individual regrets their preceding conduct
- Culpability, a legal term
- Guilt (law), a legal term

== Music ==
- Guilt (album), a 2009 album by Mims
- "Guilt" (The Long Blondes song), 2008
- "Guilt" (Nero song), 2011

== Film, television and games ==
- Guilt (1931 film), a 1931 film featuring James Carew
- Guilt (2005 film), a 2005 film featuring Margaret Travolta
- Guilt (2009 film), a 2009 Greek-Cypriot film
- Guilt (American TV series), a 2016 American television series
- Guilt (British TV series), a 2019 British television series
- "Guilt" (Revenge), an episode of the TV series Revenge
- GUILT, or Gangliated Utrophin Immuno Latency Toxin, antagonistic parasites in the Trauma Center series

== See also ==
- Guilty (disambiguation)
- Gilt (disambiguation)
- Guilt trip (disambiguation)
