= Culpa =

Culpa or La Culpa may refer to:

- Culpa (film), a 1993 Cuban film
- La culpa (TV series), a Mexican telenovela
- "La culpa" (song), by Joel Deleōn, 2021

== See also ==
- Culpability
- Criminal negligence
- Mea culpa, Latin phrase for 'it is my fault'
