= Gilt =

Gilt may refer to:

- Gilt, a young female domestic pig
- Gilding, the application of a thin layer of precious metal
- Gilt-edged securities, UK government bonds
- Gilt (album), an album by Machines of Loving Grace
- Gilt Groupe, a shopping website
- Gilt darter, Percina evides, a small freshwater fish
- Internationalization and localization, a computing process sometimes referred to as GILT (for "globalization, internationalization, localization and translation")

== See also ==
- Guilt (disambiguation)
