= Guilt trip (disambiguation) =

A guilt trip is a form of psychological manipulation.

Guilt trip may also refer to:

- The Guilt Trip (album), a 1992 double album by Kramer
- The Guilt Trip (film), a 2012 comedy film starring Seth Rogen and Barbra Streisand
- "Guilt Trip", a fifth-season episode of the television series Numb3rs
- "Guilt Trip" (song), a song by Kanye West from the album Yeezus (2013)
- "The Guilt Trip", an episode of Derren Brown's television series Derren Brown: The Experiments
- "Guilt Trip", a season 2 episode of The Casagrandes
- Guilt Trip (band), a hardcore punk band from Manchester, UK
