= Interstate Abortion Bill =

Series of unsuccessful bills

The Interstate Abortion Bills have been a series of unsuccessful bills regularly nominated in the United States Congress. Several versions of the bill were passed between February 2005 and September 2006, but did not become law. If enacted, these bills would make it a federal crime for non-parents/guardians to take a pregnant minor from a state where abortion is illegal to a state where it is legal, for the purposes of an abortion, without the consent of the minor's parents, punishable by up to a year in prison.

In 1998, the Child Custody Protection Act (H.R. 3682) passed the House by a vote of 276–150, but was not voted on by the Senate. In 2005, the House again passed the Child Custody Protection Act, with the Senate passing an amended version, the Child Interstate Abortion Notification Act (S. 403), in July 2006 by a vote of 65–34. In September 2006, the House passed a compromise version by a vote of 264–153, but when the bill returned again to the Senate, it was filibustered.

Additional versions of the bill, either named Child Custody Protection Act or Child Interstate Abortion Notification Act, have been introduced in both the House and the Senate in 2011, 2013, 2015, 2017, 2019, and 2021.

The 2006 version of the bill received the support of then-president George W. Bush.

In June 2022, the Supreme Court of the United States ruled in Dobbs v. Jackson Women's Health Organization that abortion is not a constitutionally-protected right. Justice Brett Kavanaugh concurred with the court in ruling that abortion was not constitutionally protected, Kavanaugh found that laws prohibiting women from traveling from a state where abortion care is illegal to a different state to obtain an abortion would infringe on constitutionally-protected freedom of movement between states, making Interstate Abortion Bills unconstitutional unless a federal act of Congress prohibited abortions.
