= Guilty (1953 film) =

1953 film by Mehdi Garami

- Directed by: Mehdi Garami
- Written by: Mehdi Garami; Hosseingholi Mosta'an
- Produced by: Simik Constantin; Vahan Terpanchian
- Starring: Ali Tabesh
- Cinematography: Abolghasem Rezaie
- Production company: Alborz
- Release date: 18 June 1953
- Running time: 110 minutes
- Country: Iran
- Language: Persian

Guilty (Persian: Gonahkar) is a 1953 Iranian film directed by Mehdi Garami.

== Cast ==
- Shahla Riahi
- Zia AlAbsari
- Ali Tabesh
- Shahin
- Ahmad Ghadakchian

== Bibliography ==
- Mohammad Ali Issari. Cinema in Iran, 1900-1979. Scarecrow Press, 1989.
