= Texas abortion statutes (1961) =

Portions of the 1961 Texas Penal Code

Articles 1191-1194 and 1196 of the Texas Penal Code were the portions of the 1961 Texas Penal Code that were challenged and held to be unconstitutional in the landmark U.S. Supreme Court case of Roe v. Wade (1973).

== Provisions ==
=== Punishment for procuring an abortion ===
Article 1191 set forth a punishment of two to five years' imprisonment for "any person" who would "procure an abortion" for a pregnant woman by:

1. "designedly administer[ing] ... any drug or medicine"
2. "knowingly procur[ing] to be administered ... any drug or medicine"
3. using "towards her any violence or means whatever externally or internally applied"

The penalty would double "if it be done without her consent".

=== Accomplice liability ===
Article 1192 set forth accomplice liability for any person who "furnishes the means for procuring an abortion knowing the purpose intended".

=== Punishment for attempting to procure an abortion ===
Article 1193 set forth a fine of $100-$1,000 for a person who engages in means "calculated to produce" an abortion but that fail to do so.

=== Death of mother is murder ===
Article 1194 set forth that, "if the death of the mother is occasioned" by an abortion or attempted abortion, "it is murder."

=== Exception: Medical advice intended to save the mother's life ===
Article 1196 carved out an exception for an abortion "procured or attempted by medical advice for the purpose of saving the life of the mother."

== History ==
Texas first enacted a criminal abortion statute in 1854. This was soon modified into language that remained substantially unchanged into the final text. The final article in each of these compilations provided the same exception for an abortion by "medical advice for the purpose of saving the life of the mother."

In 1908, a suggestion was made that the Texas statutes were unconstitutionally vague because of definitional deficiencies. The Texas Court of Criminal Appeals disposed of that suggestion peremptorily, saying only,

It is also insisted in the motion in arrest of judgment that the statute is unconstitutional and void in that it does not sufficiently define or describe the offense of abortion. We do not concur in respect to this question.

In 1971, the same court, in affirming a physician's abortion conviction, again held that the State's abortion statutes were not unconstitutionally vague or overbroad. The court held that "the State of Texas has a compelling interest to protect fetal life"; that Art. 1191 "is designed to protect fetal life"; that the Texas homicide statutes, particularly Art. 1205 of the Penal Code, are intended to protect a person "in existence by actual birth," and thereby implicitly recognize other human life that is not "in existence by actual birth"; that the definition of human life is for the legislature and not the courts; that Art. 1196 "is more definite than the District of Columbia statute upheld in Vuitch" (402 U.S. 62); and that the Texas statute "is not vague and indefinite or overbroad." The court observed that any issue as to the burden of proof under the exemption of Art. 1196 "is not before us."

The Court in Roe v. Wade, after reciting this history, noted, "But see Veevers v. State, 172 Tex.Cr.R. 162, 168-169 ... (1962), Cf. United States v. Vuitch 402 U.S. 62, 69 (1971)."

== See also ==
- Whole Woman's Health v. Hellerstedt
