= Culpability =

Degree to which one is morally or legally responsible for a crime

In criminal law, culpability, or being culpable, is a measure of the degree to which an agent, such as a person, can be held morally or legally responsible for action and inaction. It has been noted that the word culpability "ordinarily has normative force, for in nonlegal English, a person is culpable only if he is justly to blame for his conduct". The guilt principle requires that in order to convict a person it is necessary to ascertain his voluntary or reckless behaviour, Strict Liability being prohibited.

== Etymology ==
Culpability descends from the Latin concept of fault (culpa), which is also the origin of the phrase, mea culpa.

== Concept ==
The concept of culpability is intimately tied up with notions of agency, freedom, and free will. All are commonly held to be necessary, but not sufficient, conditions for culpability.

A person is culpable if they cause a negative event and
(1) the act was intentional;
(2) the act and its consequences could have been controlled (i.e., the agent knew the likely consequences, the agent was not coerced, and the agent overcame hurdles to make the event happen); and
(3) the person provided no excuse or justification for the actions.

== In law ==
From a legal perspective, culpability describes the degree of one's blameworthiness in the commission of a crime or offense. Except for strict liability crimes, the type and severity of punishment often follow the degree of culpability. "Culpability means, first and foremost, direct involvement in the wrongdoing, such as through participation or instruction", as compared with responsibility merely arising from "failure to supervise or to maintain adequate controls or ethical culture".

=== United States law ===
Modern criminal codes in the United States usually make distinct four degrees of culpability.

Legal definitions of culpability, verbatim from the Pennsylvania Crimes Code, are:

1. A person acts purposely (criminally) with respect to a material element of an offense when:
  1. if the element involves the nature of his conduct or a result thereof, it is his conscious object to engage in conduct of that nature or to cause such a result; and
  2. if the element involves the attendant circumstances, he is aware of the existence of such circumstances or he believes or hopes that they exist.
2. A person acts knowingly with respect to a material element of an offense when:
  1. if the element involves the nature of his conduct or the attendant circumstances, he is aware that his conduct is of that nature or that such circumstances exist; and
  2. if the element involves a result of his conduct, he is aware that it is practically certain that his conduct will cause such a result.
3. A person acts recklessly with respect to a material element of an offense when he consciously disregards a substantial and unjustifiable risk that the material element exists or will result from his conduct. The risk must be of such a nature and degree that, considering the nature and intent of the actor's conduct and the circumstances known to him, its disregard involves a gross deviation from the standard of conduct that a reasonable person would observe in the actor's situation.
4. A person acts negligently with respect to a material element of an offense when he should be aware of a substantial and unjustifiable risk that the material element exists or will result from his conduct. The risk must be of such a nature and degree that the actor's failure to perceive it, considering the nature and intent of his conduct and the circumstances known to him, involves a gross deviation from the standard of care that a reasonable person would observe in the actor's situation.

In short:

- A person causes a result purposely if the result is his/her goal in doing the action that causes it,
- A person causes a result knowingly if he/she knows that the result is virtually certain to occur from the action he/she undertakes,
- A person causes a result recklessly if he/she is aware of and disregards a substantial and unjustifiable risk of the result occurring from the action, and
- A person causes a result negligently if there is a substantial and unjustifiable risk he/she is unaware of but should be aware of.

The first two types of culpability are each a subset of the following. Thus if someone acts purposely, they also act knowingly. If someone acts knowingly, they also act recklessly.

The definitions of specific crimes refer to these degrees to establish the mens rea (mental state) necessary for a person to be guilty of a crime. The stricter the culpability requirements, the harder it is for the prosecution to prove its case.

For instance, the definition of first degree murder (again in Pennsylvania) is "A criminal homicide constitutes murder of the first degree when it is committed by an intentional killing." Thus to be guilty of murder in the first degree, one must have an explicit goal in one's mind to cause the death of another. On the other hand, reckless endangerment has a much broader requirement: "A person commits a misdemeanor of the second degree if he recklessly engages in conduct which places or may place another person in danger of death or serious bodily injury." Thus to be guilty of this one only needs to be aware of a substantial risk he is putting others in danger of; it does not have to be one's explicit goal to put people in risk. (But, if one's goal is to put others in substantial risk of death or serious bodily injury, this is, of course, sufficient.)

There is one more type of culpability, and that is strict liability. In strict liability crimes, the actor is responsible no matter what his mental state; if the result occurs, the actor is liable. An example is the felony murder rule: if the prosecution proves beyond reasonable doubt that one commits a qualifying felony (see the article) during which death results, one is held strictly liable for murder and the prosecution does not have to prove any of the normal culpability requirements for murder.

== See also ==
- Blame
- Guilt (disambiguation)
- Scapegoating
- Mens rea
- Non compos mentis
