= Abortion in the District of Columbia =

Abortion in the District of Columbia is legal at all stages of pregnancy. In 1971, in United States v. Vuitch, the U.S. Supreme Court upheld a law saying abortion was allowed for health reasons, which include "psychological and physical well-being". Consequently, the District of Columbia became a destination for women seeking abortions starting that year.

The number of abortion clinics in the District has been declining in recent years, going from fourteen in 1982 to fifteen in 1992 to five in 2014. In 2017, there was only one Planned Parenthood clinic in the district offering abortion services. There were 2,790 legal abortions in the District in 2014 and 1,424 in 2015. The District is home to both abortion-rights and anti-abortion activism. On the abortion-rights side, Catholics for Choice and EMILY's List are based there. On the anti-abortion side, March for Life takes place annually protesting both the practice and legality of abortion on or around the anniversary of Roe v. Wade.

== History ==
Because of the nature of their abortion laws, New York City and the District of Columbia became destination centers for women in 1971 who were seeking legal abortions. In 1980, the District of Columbia provided local funding for poor women who sought abortions. These funds covered around 85% of all women in the district seeking abortions. Federal funding was no longer available as a result of the Hyde Amendment. Local funding meant that despite decreases in legal abortions in 39 other states without local funding, the District of Columbia saw an increase in the number of legal abortions.

=== Legislative history ===
A law in Washington, D.C., which allowed abortion to protect the life or health of the woman, was challenged in the Supreme Court in 1971 in United States v. Vuitch. The court upheld the law, deeming that "health" meant "psychological and physical well-being", essentially allowing abortion in Washington, D.C.

=== Judicial history ===
The 1971 case United States v. Vuitch involving a woman from the District of Columbia ruled that abortion can be legally justifiable for the mental health of the pregnant woman.

=== Clinic history ===
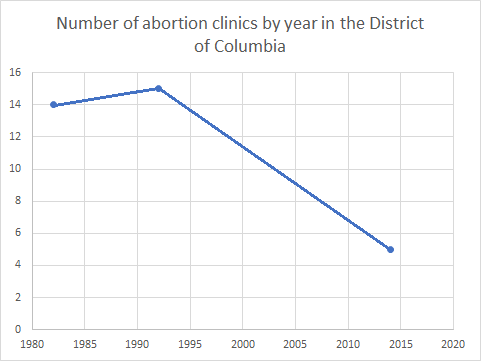
Number of abortion clinics in the District of Columbia by year

Between 1982 and 1992, the number of abortion clinics in the state increased by one, going from fourteen in 1982 to fifteen in 1992. In 1996, the District had 18 abortion clinics and was one of only three to gain clinics in the period between 1992 and 1996. In 2014, there were five abortion clinics in the District. In 2017, there was one Planned Parenthood clinic, which offered abortion services, in an area with a population of 200,588 women aged 15–49.

== Statistics ==
In the period between 1972 and 1974, Texas and the District of Columbia had the highest illegal abortion deaths ratio and rates in the United States with rates of 62 and 21 deaths per million live births respectively. The deaths in the District of Columbia and New York in this period demonstrated that even where abortion is legal, women face circumstances that drive them to have irregular, non-physician assisted abortions. There are a variety of factors for this including lack of education, poverty and distrust of the medical establishment. In 1990, 93,000 women in the District faced the risk of an unintended pregnancy. Based on the ratio of the number of women aged 15–44 years, in 2001, Idaho had the lowest rate of induced abortions at 3 per 1,000 women while the District of Columbia had the highest at 37 per 1,000. In 2014, 70% of adults said in a poll by the Pew Research Center that abortion should be legal in all or most cases.

Number of reported abortions, abortion rate and percentage change in rate by geographic region and state in 1992, 1995 and 1996
Census division and state	Number			Rate			% change 1992–1996
Census division and state	1992	1995	1996	1992	1995	1996	% change 1992–1996
South Atlantic	269,200	261,990	263,600	25.9	24.6	24.7	–5
Delaware	5,730	5,790	4,090	35.2	34.4	24.1	–32
District of Columbia	21,320	21,090	20,790	138.4	151.7	154.5	12
Florida	84,680	87,500	94,050	30	30	32	7
Georgia	39,680	36,940	37,320	24	21.2	21.1	–12
Maryland	31,260	30,520	31,310	26.4	25.6	26.3	0
North Carolina	36,180	34,600	33,550	22.4	21	20.2	–10
South Carolina	12,190	11,020	9,940	14.2	12.9	11.6	–19
Virginia	35,020	31,480	29,940	22.7	20	18.9	–16
West Virginia	3,140	3,050	2,610	7.7	7.6	6.6	–14

Number, rate, and ratio of reported abortions, by reporting area of residence and occurrence and by percentage of abortions obtained by out-of-state residents, US CDC estimates
Location	Residence			Occurrence			% obtained by out-of-state residents	Year	Ref
Location	No.	Rate^	Ratio^^	No.	Rate^	Ratio^^	% obtained by out-of-state residents	Year	Ref
District of Columbia	1,407	7.9	148	2,790	15.7	293	55.6	2014	
District of Columbia	1,424	7.9	149	1,267	7	132	—	2015	
District of Columbia	—	—	—	—	—	—	—	2016	
^number of abortions per 1,000 women aged 15–44; ^^number of abortions per 1,000 live births

== Abortion-rights views and activities ==
=== Organizations ===
An advocacy organization called Catholics for Choice (CFC) was founded in 1973 to support the availability of abortion, stating that this position is compatible with Catholic teachings particularly with primacy of conscience and the importance of the laity in shaping church law.

EMILY's List was founded in the District of Columbia in 1985. One of its goals was to try to support more female candidates that supported abortion-rights positions.

=== Activities ===
In October 1984, CFC (then Catholics for a Free Choice) placed an advertisement, signed by over one hundred prominent Catholics, including nuns, in the New York Times. The advertisement, called A Catholic Statement on Pluralism and Abortion contested claims by the Church hierarchy that all Catholics opposed abortion-rights, and said that "direct abortion ... can sometimes be a moral choice." The Holy See initiated disciplinary measures against some of the nuns who signed the statement, sparking controversy among American Catholics, and intra-Catholic conflict on the abortion issue remained news for at least two years in the United States.

=== Protests ===
Since 2017 there has been an annual Women's March in Washington DC in January, the weekend of the anniversary of Roe v. Wade.

#StopTheBans was created in response to 6 states passing legislation in early 2019 that would almost completely outlaw abortion. Women wanted to protest this activity as other state legislatures started to consider similar bans as part of a move to try to overturn Roe v. Wade. Women from the District participated in marches supporting abortion-rights as part of a #StoptheBans movement in May 2019. The largest protest as part of #StopTheBans took place at the U.S. Supreme Court in Washington, D.C., on May 21. People in attendance included NARAL President Ilyse Hogue and Planned Parenthood President Dr. Leana Wen. Many women wore red, referencing women in Margaret Atwood's The Handmaid's Tale.

Following the overturn of Roe v. Wade on June 24, 2022, anti-abortion and abortion-rights activists demonstrated outside the Supreme Court building. By noon, there was a major police presence around the Supreme Court building and the Capitol building, including police with riot gear, and police squad cars and SUVs. Multiple streets were barricaded by police.

On June 30, 2022, more than 180 abortion-rights protesters were arrested in Washington, D.C. after sitting and blocking an intersection near the Supreme Court.

On July 4, 2022, abortion-rights protests were held across the country, including Washington, D.C., New York City, Philadelphia, Boston, Los Angeles, Sacramento, San Francisco, San Diego, Portland, Seattle, Chicago, Minneapolis, Kansas City, Springfield, Madison, Milwaukee, Lansing, Detroit, Bloomington, Columbus, Cleveland, Cincinnati, Denver, Charlotte, Asheville, Atlanta, Roanoke, Birmingham, Tampa, Miami, Las Vegas, Albuquerque, Salt Lake City, San Antonio, Austin, and Houston.

On July 9, 2022, another day of abortion-rights protests occurred in cities across the country, with over 10,000 people marching in Washington, D.C.

On July 19, 2022, 35 abortion-rights protesters including 17 members of Congress were arrested in Washington, D.C. after blocking an intersection near the Supreme Court.

On October 8, 2022, thousands of people marched and rallied in abortion-rights protests in cities across the country, in conjunction with the Women's March in Washington, D.C.

On November 2, 2022, three abortion-rights protesters were arrested in Washington, D.C. after interrupting arguments during a Supreme Court session.

On January 20, 2023, abortion-rights protesters disrupted an anti-abortion service in Washington, D.C.

On January 20, 2024, thousands of abortion-rights protesters rallied and marched at more than 100 Women's March events nationwide, with the main events held in Phoenix, Arizona and Washington, DC.

On March 26, 2024, hundreds of abortion-rights protesters rallied and marched in Washington, DC as the Supreme Court heard oral arguments on whether or not to limit access to mifepristone. 13 abortion-rights protesters were arrested for blocking an intersection near the Supreme Court.

On September 14, 2024, about 2,000 people participated in the first Gender Liberation March in Washington, DC, which united abortion-rights protesters and transgender rights protesters.

On November 2, 2024, thousands of abortion-rights protesters rallied and marched at Women's March events nationwide, with the main event held in Washington, DC, where over 15,000 people marched.

On November 9, 2024, hundreds of abortion-rights protesters rallied at a Women's March protest outside of the Heritage Foundation headquarters in Washington, DC.

On December 10, 2024, several people were arrested during a protest to ratify the Equal Rights Amendment in Washington, DC.

== Anti-abortion activities and views ==
=== Activities ===
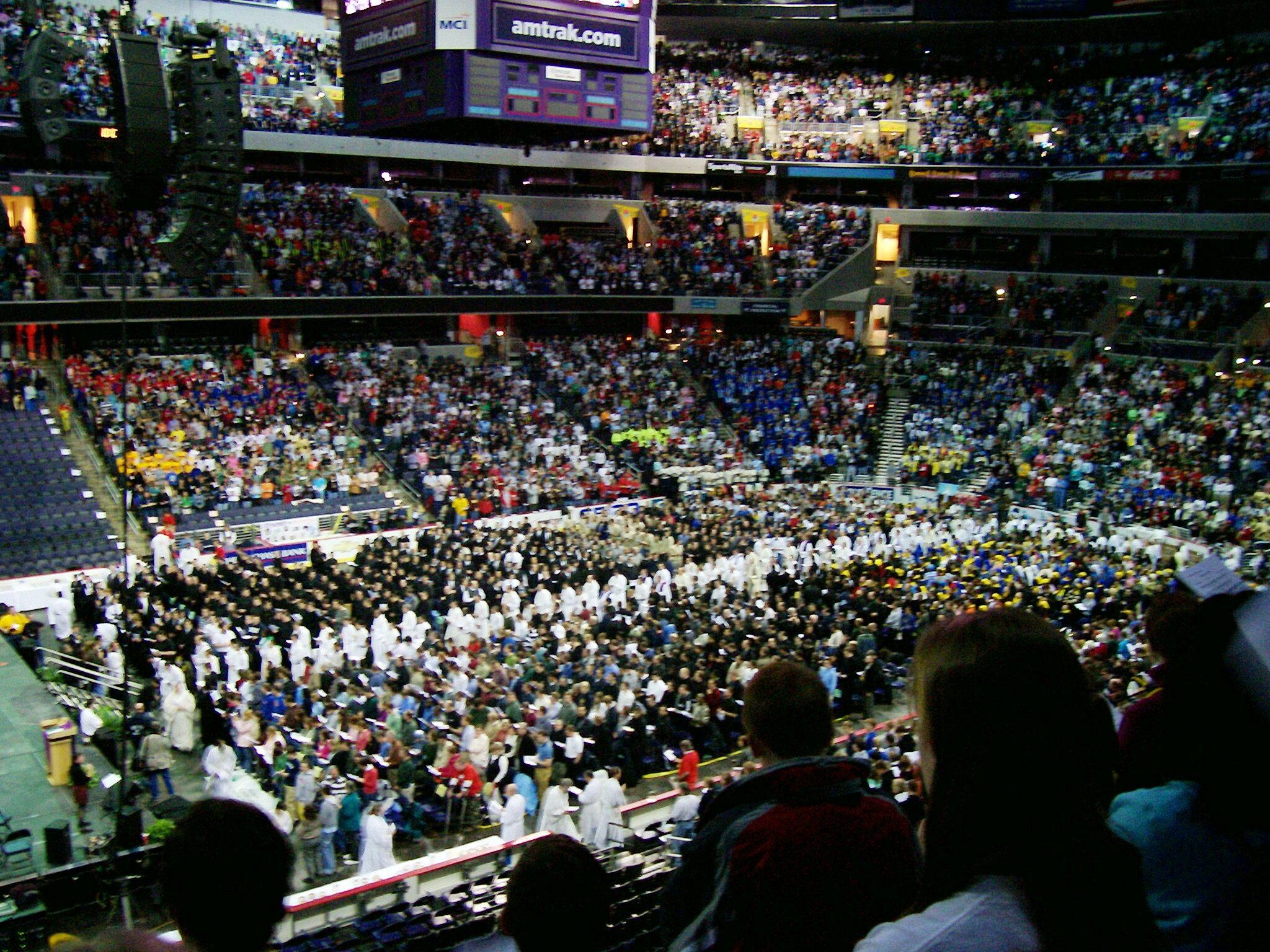
Youth Rally and Mass at Verizon Center (2006)

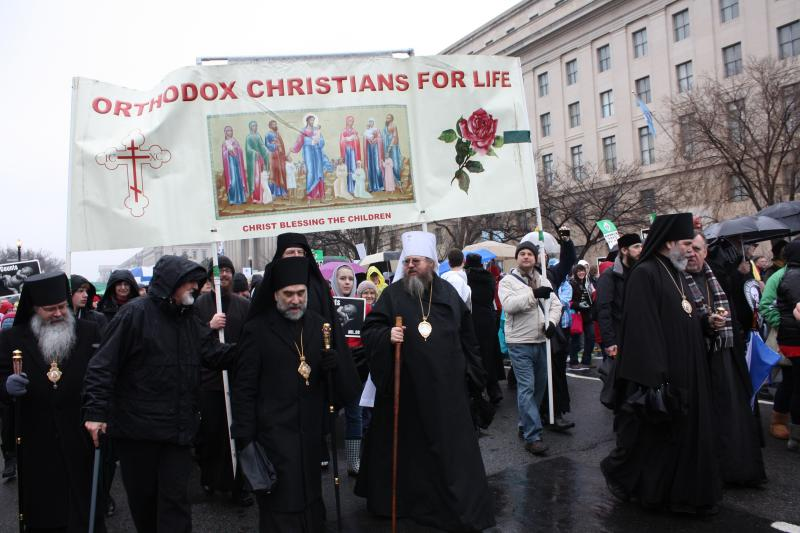
Orthodox clergy and laity at the March for Life in 2012

The March for Life is an annual rally protesting both the practice and legality of abortion, held in Washington, D.C., on or around the anniversary of Roe v. Wade on January 22, a landmark decision issued in 1973 by the United States Supreme Court decriminalizing abortion. The march, whose stated mission is to "End abortion by uniting, educating, and mobilizing pro-life people in the public square", advocates for overturning Roe v. Wade. The event typically draws tens of thousands of attendees. The March for Life proceedings begin around noon. They typically consist of a rally at the National Mall near Fourth Street (in 2018, this will be near 12th St. NW). It is followed by a march which travels down Constitution Avenue NW, turns right at First Street NE, and then ends on the steps of the Supreme Court, where another rally is held. Many protesters start the day by delivering roses and lobbying members of Congress. The first March for Life, which was founded by Nellie Gray, was held on January 22, 1974, on the West Steps of the Capitol, with an estimated 20,000 supporters in attendance. The march was originally intended to be a one-time event, in hopes that the Supreme Court would reverse Roe v. Wade immediately a year after its ruling. However, after the first march in 1974, Gray took steps to institute the rally as a yearly event until Roe v. Wade was overturned by incorporating more grassroots anti-abortion activists into the march, which would later be officially recognized as a nonprofit organization the same year. During the 33rd annual March for Life in 2006, the nomination of Judge Samuel Alito to the Supreme Court caused a major shift for the movement, because of the expectation that Alito would "win Senate approval and join a majority in overturning Roe."

On October 22, 2020, five anti-abortion protesters were arrested after forcing their way into a clinic in Washington, DC and blocking people from entering. They were convicted of violating federal law and face up to 11 years in prison.

=== Violence ===
1984 saw a surge in attacks on abortion clinics in the United States with 6 arson attacks and 23 bomb attacks. These attacks caused over US$4.3 million in damages in nine states and the District of Columbia. An incident of anti-abortion violence occurred at an abortion clinic in Washington, D.C., on July 4, 1984.

1985 saw a renewed high levels of attacks on abortion clinics in the United States with seventeen arson attacks and eleven bomb attacks. These attacks caused over US$3.8 million in damages in nine states and the District of Columbia.
