= Richardson v. Perales =

- Supreme Court of the United States

Argued January 13, 1971 Decided May 3, 1971
- Full case name: Richardson, Secretary of Health, Education, and Welfare v. Perales
- Citations: 402 U.S. 389 (more) 91 S. Ct. 1420; 28 L. Ed. 2d 842; 1971 U.S. LEXIS 103

Case history
- Prior: Perales v. Sec'y of Health, Ed. & Welfare, 288 F. Supp. 313 (W.D. Tex. 1968); affirmed and remanded sub nom. Cohen v. Perales, 412 F.2d 44 (5th Cir. 1969); rehearing en banc denied, 416 F.2d 1250 (5th Cir. 1969); cert. granted sub nom., Finch v. Perales, 397 U.S. 1035 (1970).

Holding
- Dr. Leavitt's interpretation of the medical data was acceptable evidence in an agency hearing, even if it would have been inadmissible under rules of evidence applicable to court procedure.

Court membership
- Chief Justice Warren E. Burger Associate Justices Hugo Black · William O. Douglas; John M. Harlan II · William J. Brennan Jr. Potter Stewart · Byron White; Thurgood Marshall · Harry Blackmun

Case opinions
- Majority: Blackmun, joined by Burger, Harlan, Stewart, White, Marshall
- Dissent: Douglas, joined by Black, Brennan

Laws applied
- Administrative Procedure Act, 5 U.S.C. Sec. 556(d), Social Security Act

Richardson v. Perales, 402 U.S. 389 (1971), was a case heard by the United States Supreme Court to determine and delineate several questions concerning administrative procedure in Social Security disability cases. Among the questions considered was the propriety of using physicians' written reports generated from medical examinations of a disability claimant, and whether these could constitute "substantial evidence" supportive of finding nondisability under the Social Security Act.

== Issues ==
1.) Do written reports by physicians who have examined a claimant for disability benefits under the Social Security Act constitute “substantial evidence”?

2.) Are such reports allowable to support a finding of non-disability?

3.) Are such reports hearsay under the rules of evidence in administrative law hearings?

4.) Is cross-examination of the authors of such reports allowable under the subpoena rules of administrative law?

5.) Does the failure of the claimant to exercise subpoena power, and call hostile witnesses for cross examination at a hearing constitute a violation of due process requirements?

6.) Are federal administrative law judges allowed to seek opinion evidence, or case advisement from neutral observers whom they hire, without the permission of the claimant?

7.) What is the status of “stacked hearsay,” where opinion reports are created based on other opinions about the claimant, but without examining the claimant?

8.) Is the Social Security Act to be interpreted liberally in matters of disability determination?

9.) Are Social Security disability benefits an entitlement subject to the due process protections of the Fourteenth Amendment of the United States Constitution, as delineated in Goldberg v. Kelly?

== Holdings ==
1.) Written reports submitted by physicians in the treatment and evaluation of patients are admissible, and should be considered substantial evidence in disability hearings under the Social Security Act, even though by their nature, they are ‘hearsay.”

2.) Hearsay evidence is admissible up to the point of relevancy in such hearings.

3.) Subpoena of witnesses is within the jurisdiction and allowable under the rules of procedure in Social Security disability hearings.

4.) Reliance on “stacked hearsay” - where written records are reviewed by others who have not examined the patient, but issue reports based on their review, which then are followed by more generation of reports by individuals who have reviewed the record should be discouraged.

5.) It is within the jurisdiction of administrative law judges to hire outside case consultants or advisors to review the issues of the case and offer reports and testimony in the furtherance of resolution. This is a practice that is advisable, in particular in those cases where the medical records and testimony are conflicting, or the medical issues are not clear.

6.) The Social Security Act is to be interpreted liberally in favor of the claimant.

7.) Social Security disability is different from welfare entitlements and does not require the same level of due process protections under the Fourteenth Amendment of the United States Constitution as the court delineated in Goldberg v. Kelly

== Facts and background ==
In 1966 Pedro Perales, a San Antonio truck driver, then aged 34, height 5' 11", weight about 220 pounds, filed a claim for disability insurance benefits under the Social Security Act. Judicial review, as noted in the statute relates, "The findings of the Secretary as to any fact, if supported by substantial evidence, shall be conclusive . . . ."

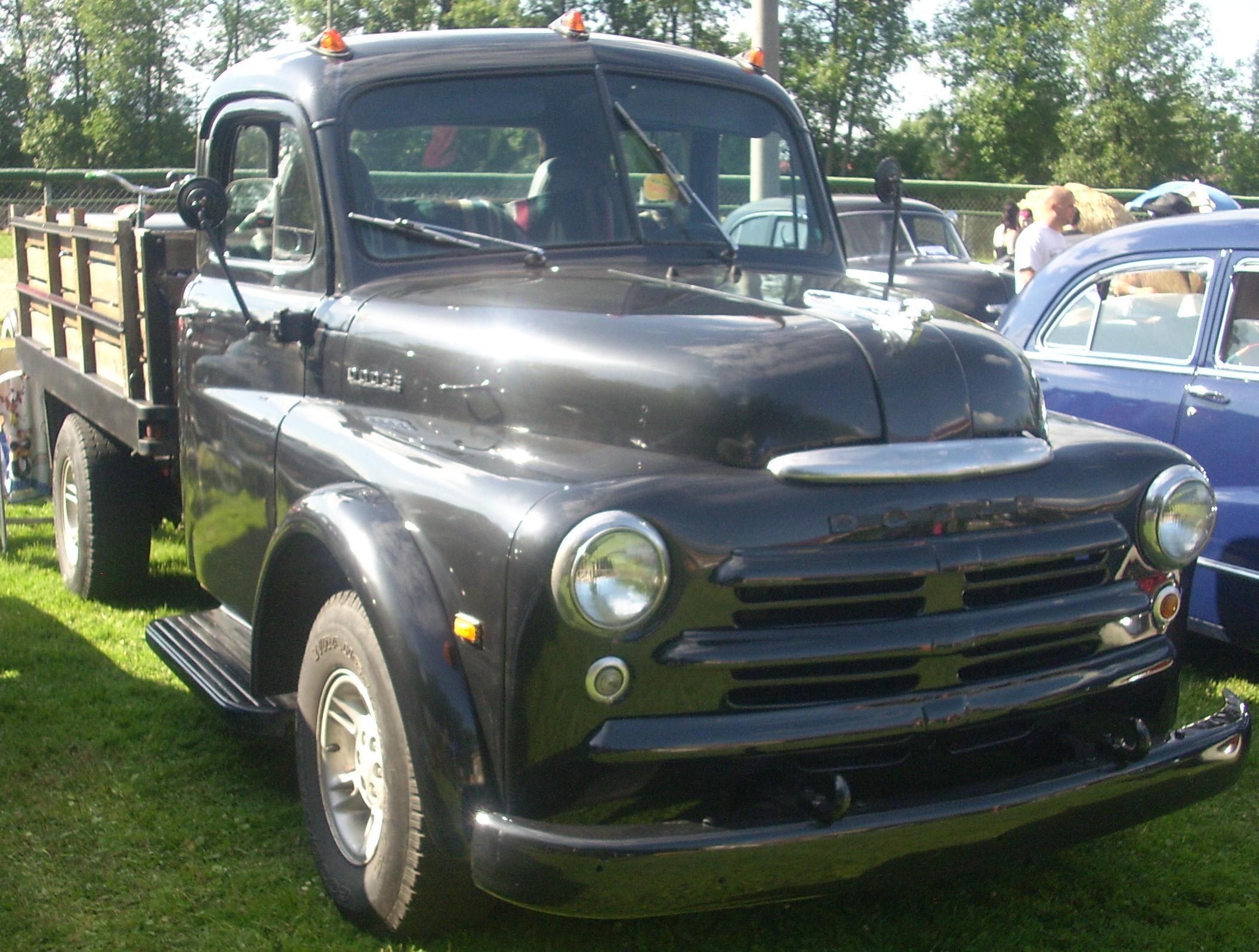
Perales was a truck driver who was injured on the job.

Pedro Perales had claimed he had received a back injury by lifting an object at work. Some of his doctors were unable to find an objective neurological explanation for his continuing pain. His doctors' medical reports were submitted to the state Division of Disability Determination, which ordered a consultative examination, which was unfavorable to him. At an agency hearing, the division had called an independent "medical advisor", Dr. Leavitt to assess the medical reports from Mr. Perales' doctors. Dr. Leavitt did not examine Perales but stated that the consensus of the medical reports was that Perales had suffered an impairment of only mild severity. The division denied Perales' claim for disability benefits.

The issue here is whether physicians' written reports of medical examinations they have made of a disability claimant may constitute "substantial evidence" supportive of a finding of nondisability, within the 205 (g) standard, when the claimant objects to the admissibility of those reports and when the only live testimony is presented by his side and is contrary to the reports. Perales injured his back and subsequently had lumbar spinal surgery. He was deemed to have had a successful result by his physician and others who reviewed his case. Perales contended the surgery had been unsuccessful, in that he was unable to return to work. He presented an opinion from a physician confirming the belief that he was unemployable. Despite this, the administrative hearing found that he was not eligible for Social Security Disability. Perales did not subpoena the doctors who had written unfavorable reports and cross examine them in the course of his hearing, despite having the opportunity to do so. Later, he claimed this failure, on his part had denied him of a fair hearing, and hence claimed a violation of his constitutional right to due process.

== Majority Opinion by Mr. Justice Blackmun ==
BLACKMUN, J., delivered the opinion of the Court, in which BURGER, C. J., and HARLAN, STEWART, WHITE, and MARSHALL, JJ., joined. DOUGLAS, J., filed a dissenting opinion, in which BLACK and BRENNAN, JJ., joined.

=== Part I ===
In his claim Perales asserted that on September 29, 1965, he became disabled as a result of an injury to his back sustained in lifting an object at work. He was seen by a neurosurgeon, Dr. Ralph A. Munslow, who first recommended conservative treatment. Surgery to the lumbar spine was performed, but without relief. The patient was dismissed from the practice of Dr. Munslow on January 25, 1966, with a final diagnosis of "Neuritis, lumbar, mild."

Mr. Perales continued to complain, but examining physicians were unable to find any objective neurologic explanations for his complaints. He was advised to return to work. Perales then filed his claim. As required by 221 of the Act the claim was referred to the state agency for determination. The agency obtained the hospital records and a report from Dr. Morales. The report set forth no physical findings or laboratory studies, but the doctor again gave as his diagnosis: "Back sprain - lumbo-sacral spine," this time "moderately severe," with "Ruptured disk not ruled out." The agency arranged for a medical examination, at no cost to the patient, by Dr. John H. Langston, an orthopedic surgeon. This was done May 25.

Dr. Langston's ensuing report to the Division of Disability Determination was devastating from the claimant's standpoint. There was little evidence of any pathology which would render the claimant disabled.

The state agency denied the claim. Perales requested reconsideration. Other physicians were unable to establish a diagnosis consistent with disability. A psychological assessment opined he had a hostile personality

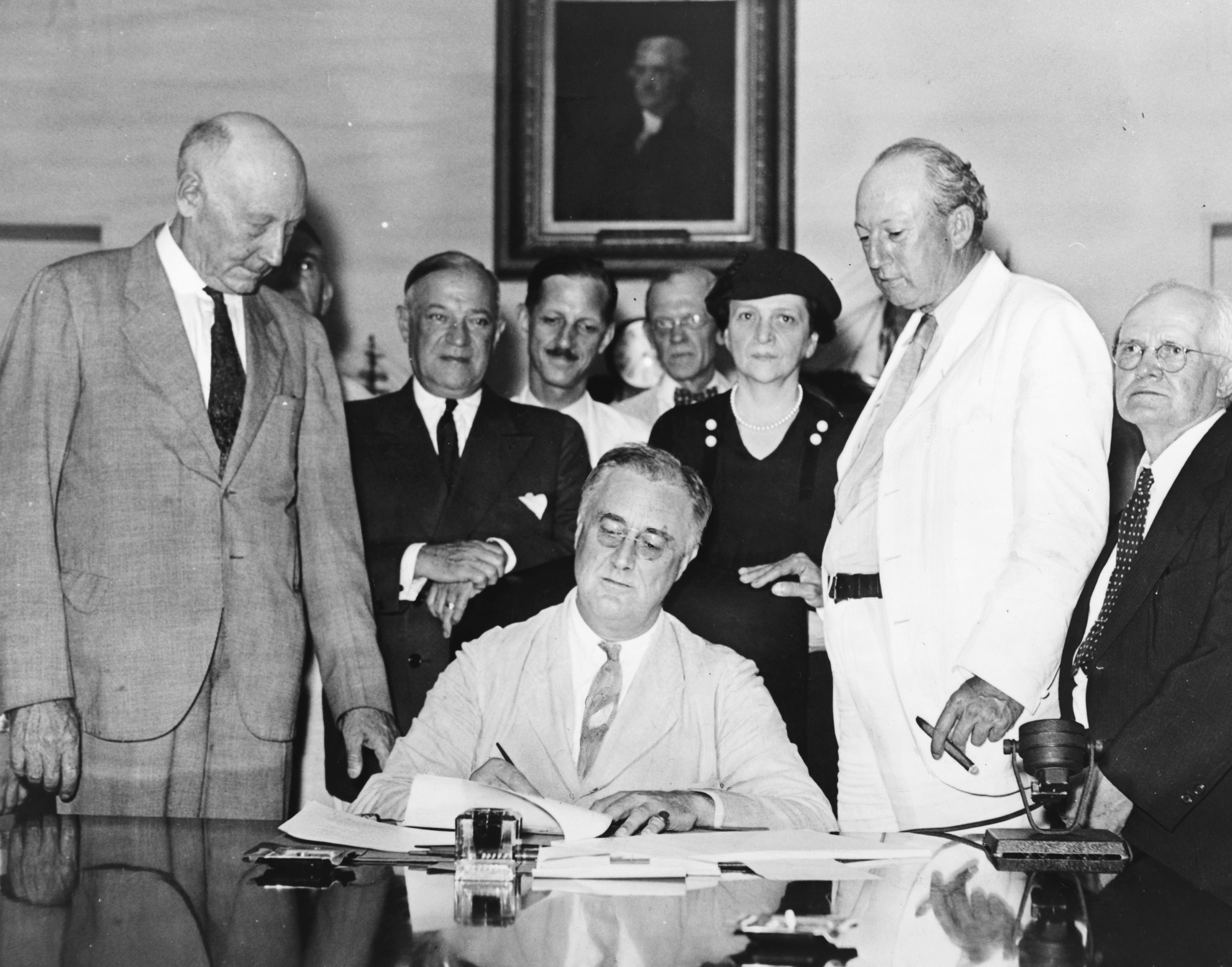
The Social Security Act, signed by Franklin D. Roosevelt in 1935 has a provision for disability

The agency again reviewed the file. The Bureau of Disability Insurance of the Social Security Administration made its independent review. The report and opinion of Dr. Morales, as the claimant's attending physician, were considered, as were those of the other examining physicians. The claim was again denied.

Perales requested a hearing before a hearing examiner. The requested hearing was set for January 12, 1967, in San Antonio. Written notice thereof was given to the claimant with a copy to his attorney. The notice contained a definition of disability, advised the claimant that he should bring all medical and other evidence not already presented, afforded him an opportunity to examine all documentary evidence on file prior to the hearing, and told him that he might bring his own physician or other witnesses and be represented at the hearing by a lawyer.

Two hearings were held on January 12 and March 31, 1967. The claimant appeared at the first hearing with his attorney and with Dr. Morales. The attorney formally objected to the introduction of the several unfriendly reports of examining physicians. Counsel asserted, among other things, the reports were hearsay.

At the two hearings oral testimony was submitted by claimant Perales, by Dr. Morales, by a former fellow employee of the claimant, by a vocational expert, and by Dr. Lewis A. Leavitt, a physician board-certified in physical medicine and rehabilitation, and chief of, and professor in, the Department of Physical Medicine at Baylor College of Medicine. Dr. Leavitt was called by the hearing examiner as an independent "medical adviser," that is, as an expert who does not examine the claimant but who hears and reviews the medical evidence and who may offer an opinion. The adviser is paid a fee by the Government. The claimant, through his counsel, objected to any testimony by Dr. Leavitt not based upon examination or upon a hypothetical. Dr. Leavitt testified over this objection and was cross-examined by the claimant's attorney. He stated that the consensus of the various medical reports was that Perales had a mild low-back syndrome of musculo-ligamentous origin.

The claimant then made a request for review by the Appeals Council and submitted as supplemental evidence a judgment dated June 2, 1967, in Perales' favor against an insurance company for workmen's compensation benefits. The Appeals Council ruled that the decision of the hearing examiner was correct.

Upon this adverse ruling the claimant instituted the present action for review pursuant to 205 (g). The case was remanded for a new hearing before a different examiner. Perales v. Secretary On appeal the Fifth Circuit noted the absence of any request by the claimant for subpoenas and held that, having this right and not exercising it, he was not in a position to complain that he had been denied the rights of confrontation and of cross-examination. It held that the hearsay evidence in the case was admissible under the Act; that, specifically, the written reports of the physicians were admissible in the administrative hearing; that Dr. Leavitt's testimony also was admissible; but that all this evidence together did not constitute substantial evidence when it was objected to and when it was contradicted by evidence from the only live witnesses.

On rehearing, the Court of Appeals observed that it did not mean by its opinion that uncorroborated hearsay could never be substantial evidence supportive of a hearing examiner's decision adverse to a claimant. It emphasized that its ruling that uncorroborated hearsay could not constitute substantial evidence was applicable only when the claimant had objected and when the hearsay was directly contradicted by the testimony of live medical witnesses and by the claimant in person. Certiorari was granted in order to review and resolve this important procedural due process issue.

=== Part II ===
This is a case in which there is conflicting medical evidence. This is a commonly encountered situation. The trier of fact has the duty to resolve that conflict. We have, on the one hand, an absence of objective findings, an expressed suspicion of only functional complaints, of malingering, and of the patient's unwillingness to do anything about remedying an unprovable situation. We have, on the other hand, the claimant's and his personal physician's earnest pleas that significant and disabling residuals from the mishap of September 1965 are indeed present.

The issue revolves, however, around a system which produces a mass of medical evidence in report form. May material of that kind ever be "substantial evidence" when it stands alone and is opposed by live medical evidence and the client's own contrary personal testimony? The courts below have held that it may not.

=== Part III ===
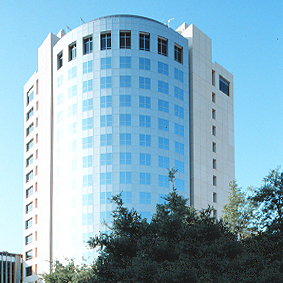
The case revolved around testimony given by the Chief of Physical Medicine at Baylor College of Medicine

The Social Security Act has been with us since 1935. The system's administrative structure and procedures, with essential determinations numbering into the millions, are of a size and extent difficult to comprehend. But, as the Government's brief here accurately pronounces, "Such a system must be fair - and it must work."

Congress has provided that the Secretary "shall have full power and authority to make rules and regulations and to establish procedures . . . necessary or appropriate to carry out such provisions, and shall adopt reasonable and proper rules and regulations to regulate and provide for the nature and extent of the proofs and evidence and the method of taking and furnishing the same in order to establish the right to benefits hereunder."

Section 205 (b) directs the Secretary to make findings and decisions; on request to give reasonable notice and opportunity for a hearing; and in the course of any hearing to receive evidence. It then provides: "Evidence may be received at any hearing before the Secretary even though inadmissible under rules of evidence applicable to court procedure." In carrying out these statutory duties the Secretary has adopted regulations that state, among other things: "The hearing examiner shall inquire fully into the matters at issue and shall receive in evidence the testimony of witnesses and any documents which are relevant and material to such matters. . . . The . . . procedure at the hearing generally . . . shall be in the discretion of the hearing examiner and of such nature as to afford the parties a reasonable opportunity for a fair hearing."

From this it is apparent that

(a) the Congress granted the Secretary the power by regulation to establish hearing procedures;

(b) strict rules of evidence, applicable in the courtroom, are not to operate at social security hearings so as to bar the admission of evidence otherwise pertinent; and

(c) the conduct of the hearing rests generally in the examiner's discretion. There emerges an emphasis upon the informal rather than the formal. This, we think, is as it should be, for this administrative procedure, and these hearings, should be understandable to the layman claimant, should not necessarily be stiff and comfortable only for the trained attorney, and should be liberal and not strict in tone and operation. This is the obvious intent of Congress so long as the procedures are fundamentally fair.

=== Part IV ===
Next, the court will turn to the statutory standard of "substantial evidence" prescribed by 205 (g). The Court has considered this very concept in other, yet similar, contexts. The National Labor Relations Act, 10 (e), in its original form, provided that the NLRB's findings of fact "if supported by evidence, shall be conclusive." 49 Stat. 454. The Court said this meant "supported by substantial evidence" and that this was "more than a mere scintilla. It means such relevant evidence as a reasonable mind might accept as adequate to support a conclusion." The Court has adhered to that definition in varying statutory situations.

=== Part V ===
It is acceptable that the propositions advanced by the claimant, some of them long established, that procedural due process is applicable to the adjudicative administrative proceeding involving "the differing rules of fair play, which through the years, have become associated with differing types of proceedings," that "the `right' to Social Security benefits is in one sense `earned,'" and that the "extent to which procedural due process must be afforded the recipient is influenced by the extent to which he may be `condemned to suffer grievous loss' . . . . Accordingly . . . `consideration of what procedures due process may require under any given set of circumstances must begin with a determination of the precise nature of the government function involved as well as of the private interest that has been affected by governmental action.'" The question, then, is as to what procedural due process requires with respect to examining physicians' reports in a social security disability claim hearing.

A written report by a licensed physician who has examined the claimant and who sets forth in his report his medical findings in his area of competence may be received as evidence in a disability hearing and, despite its hearsay character and an absence of cross-examination, and despite the presence of opposing direct medical testimony and testimony by the claimant himself, may constitute substantial evidence supportive of a finding by the hearing examiner adverse to the claimant, when the claimant has not exercised his right to subpoena the reporting physician and thereby provide himself with the opportunity for cross-examination of the physician.

The following can be concluded:

1. The identity of the five reporting physicians is significant. Each report presented here was prepared by a practicing physician who had examined the claimant. A majority (Drs. Langston, Bailey, and Mattson) were called into the case by the state agency. Although each received a fee, that fee is recompense for his time and talent otherwise devoted to private practice or other professional assignment. We cannot, and do not, ascribe bias to the work of these independent physicians, or any interest on their part in the outcome of the administrative proceeding beyond the professional curiosity a dedicated medical man possesses.

2. The vast workings of the social security administrative system make for reliability and impartiality in the consultant reports. We bear in mind that the agency operates essentially, and is intended so to do, as an adjudicator and not as an advocate or adversary. This is the congressional plan. We do not presume on this record to say that it works unfairly.

3. One familiar with medical reports and the routine of the medical examination, general or specific, will recognize their elements of detail and of value. The particular reports of the physicians who examined claimant Perales were based on personal consultation and personal examination and rested on accepted medical procedures and tests. The operating neurosurgeon, Dr. Munslow, provided his pre-operative observations and diagnosis, his findings at surgery, his post-operative diagnosis, and his post-operative observations. Dr. Lampert, the neurologist, provided the history related to him by the patient, Perales' complaints, the physical examination and neurologic tests, and his professional impressions and recommendations. Dr. Langston, the orthopedist, did the same post-operatively, and described the orthopedic tests and neurologic examination he performed, the results and his impressions and prognosis. Dr. Mattson, who did the post-operative electromyography, described the results of that test, and his impressions. And Dr. Bailey, the psychiatrist, related the history, the patient's complaints, and the psychiatric diagnosis that emerged from the typical psychiatric examination.

These are routine, standard, and unbiased medical reports by physician specialists concerning a subject whom they had seen. That the reports were adverse to Perales' claim is not in itself bias or an indication of nonprobative character.

4. The reports present the impressive range of examination to which Perales was subjected. A specialist in neurosurgery, one in neurology, one in psychiatry, one in orthopedics, and one in physical medicine and rehabilitation add up to definitive opinion in five medical specialties, all somewhat related, but different in their emphases. It is fair to say that the claimant received professional examination and opinion on a scale beyond the reach of most persons and that this case reveals a patient and careful endeavor by the state agency and the examiner to ascertain the truth.

5. So far as we can detect, there is no inconsistency whatsoever in the reports of the five specialists. Yet each result was reached by independent examination in the writer's field of specialized training.

6. Although the claimant complains of the lack of opportunity to cross-examine the reporting physicians, he did not take advantage of the opportunity afforded him under 20 CFR 404.926 to request subpoenas for the physicians. The five-day period specified by the regulation for the issuance of the subpoenas surely afforded no real obstacle to this, for he was notified that the documentary evidence on file was available for examination before the hearing and, further, a supplemental hearing could be requested. In fact, in this very case there was a supplemental hearing more than two and a half months after the initial hearings. This inaction on the claimant's part supports the Court of Appeals' view that the claimant as a consequence is to be precluded from now complaining that he was denied the rights of confrontation and cross-examination.

7. Courts have recognized the reliability and probative worth of written medical reports even in formal trials and, while acknowledging their hearsay character, have admitted them as an exception to the hearsay rule. Notable is Judge Parker's well-known ruling in the Warrisk Insurance case of Long v. United States which deserves quotation here, but which, because of its length, we do not reproduce. The Second Circuit has made a like ruling in White v. Zutell and in so doing, relied on the Business Records Act,

8. Past treatment by reviewing courts of written medical reports in social security disability cases is revealing. Until the decision in this case, the courts of appeals, including the Fifth Circuit, with only an occasional criticism of the medical report practice, uniformly recognized reliability and probative value in such reports. The courts have reviewed administrative determinations, and upheld many adverse ones, where the only supporting evidence has been reports of this kind, buttressed sometimes, but often not, by testimony of a medical adviser such as Dr. Leavitt. In these cases admissibility was not contested, but the decisions do demonstrate traditional and ready acceptance of the written medical report in social security disability cases.

Procedural issues in Social Security disability hearings were clarified in this case.

9. There is an additional and pragmatic factor which, although not controlling, deserves mention. This is what Chief Judge Brown has described as "[t]he sheer magnitude of that administrative burden," and the resulting necessity for written reports without "elaboration through the traditional facility of oral testimony." Page v. Celebrezze With over 20,000 disability claim hearings annually, the cost of providing live medical testimony at those hearings, where need has not been demonstrated by a request for a subpoena, over and above the cost of the examinations requested by hearing examiners, would be a substantial drain on the trust fund and on the energy of physicians already in short supply.

=== Part VI ===
1. Perales relies heavily on the Court's holding and statements in Goldberg v. Kelly, supra, particularly the comment that due process requires notice "and an effective opportunity to defend by confronting any adverse witnesses . . . ." Kelly, however, had to do with termination of AFDC benefits without prior notice. It also concerned a situation, the Court said, "where credibility and veracity are at issue, as they must be in many termination proceedings." The Perales proceeding is not the same. We are not concerned with termination of disability benefits once granted. Neither are we concerned with a change of status without notice. Notice was given to claimant Perales. The physicians' reports were on file and available for inspection by the claimant and his counsel. And the authors of those reports were known and were subject to subpoena and to the very cross-examination that the claimant asserts he has not enjoyed. Further, the specter of questionable credibility and veracity is not present; there is professional disagreement with the medical conclusions, to be sure, but there is no attack here upon the doctors' credibility or veracity. Kelly affords little comfort to the claimant.

2. Perales also, as the Court of Appeals stated would describe the medical reports in question as "mere uncorroborated hearsay" and would relate this to Mr. Chief Justice Hughes' sentence in Consolidated Edison Co. v. NLRB: "Mere uncorroborated hearsay or rumor does not constitute substantial evidence."

Although the reports are hearsay in the technical sense, because their content is not produced live before the hearing examiner, we feel that the claimant and the Court of Appeals read too much into the single sentence from Consolidated Edison. The contrast the Chief Justice was drawing, at the very page cited, was not with material that would be deemed formally inadmissible in judicial proceedings but with material "without a basis in evidence having rational probative force." This was not a blanket rejection by the Court of administrative reliance on hearsay irrespective of reliability and probative value. The opposite was the case.

3. The claimant, the District Court, and the Court of Appeals also criticize the use of Dr. Leavitt as a medical adviser. Inasmuch as medical advisers are used in approximately 13% of disability claim hearings, comment as to this practice is indicated. We see nothing "reprehensible" in the practice, as the claimant would describe it. The trial examiner is a layman; the medical adviser is a board-certified specialist. He is used primarily in complex cases for explanation of medical problems in terms understandable to the layman-examiner. He is a neutral adviser. This particular record discloses that Dr. Leavitt explained the technique and significance of electromyography. He did offer his own opinion on the claimant's condition. That opinion, however, did not differ from the medical reports. Dr. Leavitt did not vouch for the accuracy of the facts assumed in the reports. No one understood otherwise. See Doe v. Department of Transportation. We see nothing unconstitutional or improper in the medical adviser concept and in the presence of Dr. Leavitt in this administrative hearing.

4. Finally, the claimant complains of the system of processing disability claims. He suggests, and is joined in this by the briefs of amici, that the Administrative Procedure Act, rather than the Social Security Act, governs the processing of claims and specifically provides for cross-examination. The claimant goes on to assert that in any event the hearing procedure is invalid on due process grounds. He says that the hearing examiner has the responsibility for gathering the evidence and "to make the <ref.>[402 U.S. 389, 409]</ref> Government's case as strong as possible"; that naturally he leans toward a decision in favor of the evidence he has gathered; that justice must satisfy the appearance of justice, citing Offutt v. United States and In re Murchison: and that an "independent hearing examiner such as in the" Longshoremen's and Harbor Workers' Compensation Act should be provided.

We need not decide whether the APA has general application to social security disability claims, for the social security administrative procedure does not vary from that prescribed by the APA. Indeed, the latter is modeled upon the Social Security Act. See Final Report of the Attorney General's Committee on Administrative Procedure, contained in Administrative Procedure in Government Agencies

These provisions conform, and are consistent with, rather than differ from or supersede, the authority given the Secretary by the Social Security Act's 205 (a) and (b) "to establish procedures," and "to regulate and provide for the nature and extent of the proofs and evidence and the method of taking and furnishing the same in [402 U.S. 389, 410] order to establish the right to benefits," and to receive evidence "even though inadmissible under rules of evidence applicable to court procedure." ‘’‘Hearsay, under either Act, is thus admissible up to the point of relevancy.’‘’

The matter comes down to the question of the procedure's integrity and fundamental fairness. We see nothing that works in derogation of that integrity and of that fairness in the admission of consultants' reports, subject as they are to being material and to the use of the subpoena and consequent cross-examination. This precisely fits the statutorily prescribed "cross-examination as may be required for a full and true disclosure of the facts." That is the standard. It is clear and workable and does not fall short of procedural due process.

Neither are we persuaded by the advocate-judge-multiple-hat suggestion. It assumes too much and would bring down too many procedures designed, and working well, for a governmental structure of great and growing complexity. The social security hearing examiner, furthermore, does not act as counsel. He acts as an examiner charged with developing the facts. The 44.2% reversal rate for all federal disability hearings in cases where the state agency does not grant benefits attests to the fairness of the system and refutes the implication of impropriety.

We therefore reverse and remand for further proceedings. We intimate no view as to the merits. It is for the District Court now to determine whether the Secretary's findings, in the light of all material proffered and admissible, are supported by "substantial evidence" within the command of 205 (g).

It is so ordered.

== Concurring and dissenting opinion ==
MR. JUSTICE DOUGLAS, with whom MR. JUSTICE BLACK and MR. JUSTICE BRENNAN concur, dissenting. This claimant for social security disability benefits had a serious back injury. The doctor who examined him testified that he was permanently disabled. His case is defeated, however, by hearsay evidence of doctors and their medical reports about this claimant. Only one doctor who examined him testified at the hearing. Five other doctors who had once examined the claimant did not testify and were not subject to cross-examination. But their reports were admitted in evidence. Still another doctor testified on the hearsay in the documents of the other doctors. All of this hearsay may be received, as the Administrative Procedure Act (5 U.S.C. 556 (d) (1964 ed., Supp. V)) provides that "[a]ny oral or documentary evidence may be received." But this hearsay evidence cannot by itself be the basis for an adverse ruling. The same section of the Act states that "[a] party is entitled . . . to conduct such cross-examination as may be required for a full and true disclosure of the facts."

As a consequence the Court of Appeals said: "Our opinion holds, and we reaffirm, that mere uncorroborated hearsay evidence as to the physical condition of a claimant, standing alone and without more, in a social security disability case tried before a hearing examiner, as in our case, is not substantial evidence that will support a decision of the examiner adverse to the claimant, if the claimant objects to the hearsay evidence and if the hearsay evidence is directly contradicted by the testimony of live medical witnesses and by the claimant who [testifies] in person before the examiner, as was done in the case at bar." 416 F.2d 1250, 1251.

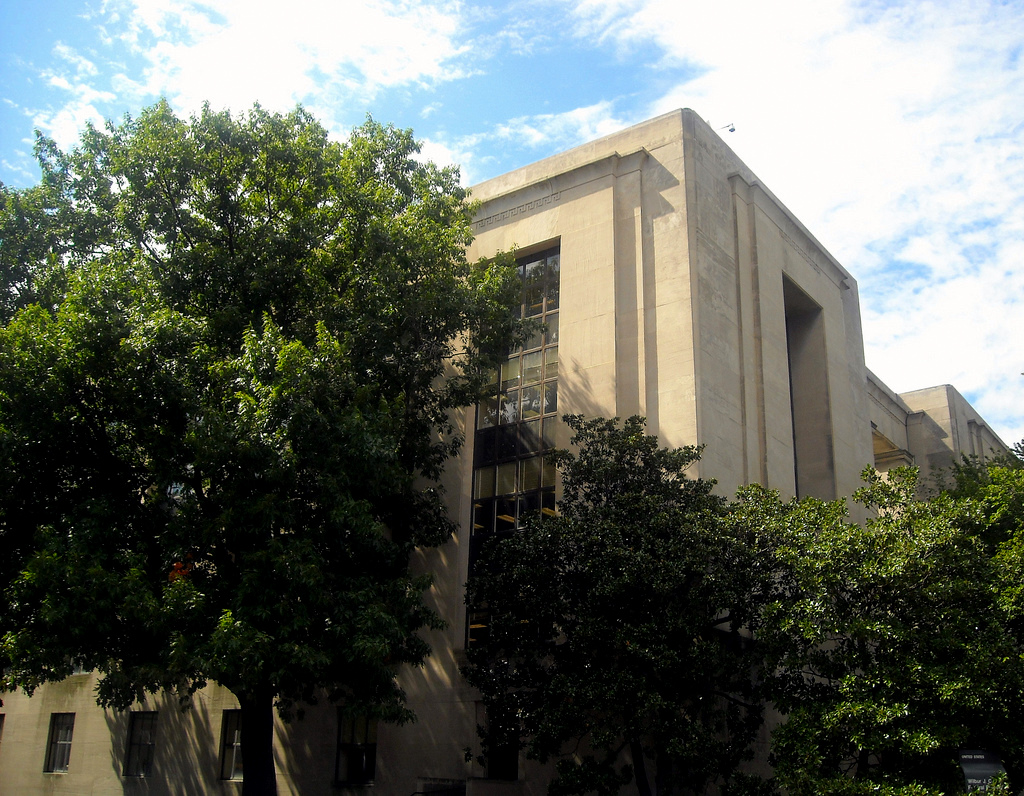
Social Security is administered from the Wilbur J. Cohen Building in Washington D. C.

Cross-examination of doctors in these physical injury cases is essential to a full and fair disclosure of the facts.

The conclusion reached by the Court of Appeals that hearsay evidence alone is not "substantial" enough to sustain a judgment adverse to the claimant is supported not only by the Administrative Procedure Act but also by the Social Security Act itself. Although Congress provided in the Social Security Act that "[e]vidence may be received at any hearing before the Secretary even though inadmissible under rules of evidence applicable to court procedure," Congress also provided that findings of the Secretary were to be conclusive only "if supported by substantial evidence." Uncorroborated hearsay untested by cross-examination does not by itself constitute "substantial evidence." Particularly where, as in this case, a disability claimant appears and testifies as to the nature and extent of his injury and his family doctor testifies in his behalf supporting the fact of his disability, the Secretary should not be able to support an adverse determination on the basis of medical reports from doctors who did not testify or the testimony of an HEW employee who never even examined the claimant as a patient.

One doctor whose word cast this claimant into limbo never saw him, never examined him, never took his vital statistics or saw him try to walk or bend or lift weights.

He was a "medical adviser" to HEW. The use of circuit-riding doctors who never see or examine claimants to defeat their claims should be beneath the dignity of a great nation. Three other doctors who were not subject to cross-examination were experts retained and paid by the Government. Some, we are told, who were subject to no cross-examination were employed by the workmen's compensation insurance company to defeat respondent's claim.

Judge Spears who first heard this case said that the way hearing officers parrot "almost word for word the conclusions" of the "medical adviser" produced "nausea" in him. Judge Spears added: "[H]earsay evidence in the nature of ex parte statements of doctors on the critical issue of a man's present physical condition is just a violation of the concept with which I am familiar and which bears upon the issue of fundamental fair play in a hearing. "Then, when you pyramid hearsay from a so-called medical advisor, who, himself, has never examined the man who claims benefits, then you just compound it - compound a situation that I simply cannot tolerate in my own mind, and I can't see why a hearing examiner wants to abrogate his duty and his responsibility and turn it over to some medical advisor."

Review of the evidence is of no value to us. The vice is in the procedure which allows it in without testing it by cross-examination. Those defending a claim look to defense-minded experts for their salvation. Those who press for recognition of a claim look to other experts. The problem of the law is to give advantage to neither, but to let trial by ordeal of cross-examination distill the truth.

The use by HEW of its stable of defense doctors without submitting them to cross-examination is the cutting of corners - a practice in which certainly the Government should not indulge. The practice is barred by the rules which Congress has provided; and we should enforce them in the spirit in which they were written. I would affirm this judgment.

"The right of cross-examination extends, in a proper case, to written evidence submitted pursuant to the last sentence of the subsection as well as to cases in which oral or documentary evidence is received in open hearing. . . . To the extent that cross-examination is necessary to bring out the truth, the party should have it. . . ." The House Judiciary Committee expressed a like view. "The provision on its face does not confer a right of so-called `unlimited' cross-examination. Presiding officers will have to make the necessary initial determination whether the cross-examination is pressed to unreasonable lengths by a party or whether it is required for the `full and true disclosure of the facts' stated in the provision. Nor is it the intention to eliminate the authority of agencies to confer sound discretion upon presiding officers in the matter of its extent. The test is - as the section states - whether it is required [402 U.S. 389, 412] `for a full and true disclosure of the facts.'. . . The right of cross-examination extends, in a proper case, to written evidence submitted pursuant to the last sentence of the section as well as to cases in which oral or documentary evidence is received in open hearing. . . . To the extent that cross-examination is necessary to bring out the truth, the party must have it. . . ." While the Administrative Procedure Act allows statutory exceptions of procedures different from those in the Act there is no explicit ban in the Social Security Act against the right of cross-examination. And the Regulations of the Secretary provide that there must be "a reasonable opportunity for a fair hearing."

Reversed and remanded.

== Discussion ==
The Supreme Court held that Dr. Leavitt's interpretation of the medical data was acceptable evidence in an agency hearing, even if it would have been inadmissible under rules of evidence applicable to court procedure. Justice Douglas joined by Justice Black and Justice Brennan dissented saying that although Section 556(d) of the Administrative Procedure Act provided that "[a]ny oral or documentary evidence may be received," which could include hearsay evidence, hearsay evidence could not by itself be the basis for an adverse ruling. Written reports by physicians who have examined claimant for disability insurance benefits under Social Security Act constitute "substantial evidence" supporting a nondisability finding within the standard of 205 (g) of the Act, notwithstanding the reports' hearsay character, the absence of cross-examination (through claimant's failure to exercise his subpoena rights), and the directly opposing testimony by the claimant and his medical witness; and procedure followed under Act does not violate due process requirements.

This case distinguishes the termination of welfare benefits already granted Goldberg v. Kelly and the due process requirements in termination from Social Security disability benefits not yet granted. The hearsay nature of medical records does not preclude their use in determining the disability status of a claimant in a social security case. The use of medical or case advisors to clarify complex medical issues is also encouraged. The court was critical of so-called “stacked hearsay” - situations where medical reports are generated from review of other medical reports, without examination of the patient. The practice of hiring doctors by HEW and Social Security to render unfavorable opinions toward claimants, without ever examining them, was condemned by the Court. The Social Security statute is to be interpreted liberally.
