= California v. Byers =

- Supreme Court of the United States

Argued December 8, 1970 Decided May 17, 1971
- Full case name: California v. Jonathan Todd Byers
- Citations: 402 U.S. 424 (more) 91 S. Ct. 1535; 29 L. Ed. 2d 9; 1971 U.S. LEXIS 128

Case history
- Prior: 71 Cal.2d 1039, 80 Cal.Rptr. 553, 458 P.2d 465

Holding
- Fifth Amendment constitutional privilege against compulsory self-incrimination was not infringed by a state statute requiring a motorist involved in accident to stop at the scene and give his or her identifying information.

Court membership
- Chief Justice Warren E. Burger Associate Justices Hugo Black · William O. Douglas; John M. Harlan II · William J. Brennan Jr. Potter Stewart · Byron White; Thurgood Marshall · Harry Blackmun

Case opinions
- Majority: Burger, joined by Stewart, White, Blackmun
- Concurrence: Harlan
- Dissent: Black, joined by Douglas, Brennan
- Dissent: Brennan, joined by Douglas, Marshall

Laws applied
- Cal.Vehicle Code § 20002, Fifth Amendment to the United States Constitution

California v. Byers, 402 U.S. 424 (1971), was a case in which the Supreme Court of the United States decided that providing personal information at the scene of an accident does not infringe on one's Fifth Amendment privilege against self-incrimination.

== Prior history ==
Jonathan Byers proceeded for writ of prohibition to restrain the Justice Court from proceeding further on a complaint of violation of California's "hit and run statute.". The Superior court granted the writ and the People appealed. The Supreme Court of California held that the state's "hit and run statute" was valid, but prosecution was precluded from using information disclosed as a result of compliance, or the fruits of such information. Compliance confronted Byers with "substantial hazards of self-incrimination" in violation of his Fifth Amendment privilege. California appealed to the US Supreme Court, which granted certiorari.

== Plurality opinion of the Court ==
In a plurality opinion of four, Chief Justice Burger concluded that "hit and run" statutes were not criminal, but regulatory in nature. Such statutes put the burden of compliance on the public at large rather than on a group of suspected criminals, and the possibility of self-incrimination was not substantial. Therefore, there was no significant infringement on Byers' privilege against self-incrimination. Relying on United States v. Sullivan, 274 U.S. 259 (1927), the Chief Justice wrote that even with the possibility that compliance under the statute were an incrimination per se, an extension of Fifth Amendment protection would be an "extreme if not extravagant application." The Chief Justice analogized that just as there is no constitutional right to refuse to file a tax return, there is no constitutional right to flee the scene of an accident.

=== Concurring opinion by Justice Harlan ===
Justice Harlan concurred in the result. He wrote that the purpose of the "hit and run" statute was non-criminal and the fear of self-incrimination was not enough to create actual self-incrimination in violation of the privilege. He noted that the state received very little information from the requirement and still endured a burden of proof at trial for all elements of the criminal offense. The risk of self-incrimination was not the same as actual incrimination. Justice Harlan noted that there were a line of cases that restricted the use of compulsory, self-reporting information for prosecutorial purposes, but they should be limited and not overruled.

=== Black dissent ===
Justice Black's dissent noted that the compulsory information from the "hit and run" statute was used to satisfy a material element of the offense. The requirement applied to those "involved in an accident resulting in damage," satisfying the material elements of the crime of property damage. Although the statute applied to a broad class of all California drivers, as applied in this particular case it violated Byers Fifth Amendment privilege. Justice Black found Byers self-report to be testimonial in nature.

=== Brennan dissent ===
Justice Brennan concluded that it was the position of the court to make the Bill of Rights "relevant to contemporary conditions" (as opposed to traditional or historical interpretations of the Bill of Rights). He criticized the plurality for making broad determinations on the tension between state law and constitutional protections writing, "only rivers of confusion can flow from lakes of generalities." Justice Brennan found that the record in the instant case resulted in a conviction from self-incrimination and that it was unnecessary to address any broader issues. He concluded that an individual could only be compelled to comply with the statute if given full immunity for prosecution. This differed substantially from the California Supreme Court ruling that would merely make such information inadmissible.

== See also ==
- Hit and run (vehicular)
- Road rage
- Actus reus
- Exclusionary rule
