= Perez v. United States =

- Supreme Court of the United States

Argued March 22, 1971 Decided April 26, 1971
- Full case name: Perez v. United States
- Citations: 402 U.S. 146 (more)

Court membership
- Chief Justice Warren E. Burger Associate Justices Hugo Black · William O. Douglas; John M. Harlan II · William J. Brennan Jr. Potter Stewart · Byron White; Thurgood Marshall · Harry Blackmun

Case opinions
- Majority: Douglas, joined by Burger, Black, Harlan, Brennan, White, Marshall, Blackmun
- Dissent: Stewart

Perez v. United States, 402 U.S. 146 (1971), was a case held by the United States Supreme Court, this decision showed the federal law criminalizing local loan sharking. Finding that Congress has authority to regulate local extortionate credit transactions under the Commerce Clause. This is based around the connection to organized crime and effect on the Interstate commerce.

This decision breaded the scope of federal power and marked a huge shift in balancing state and federal authority in criminal law enforcement. Congress could now regulate activities that pose as a threat. Through linking loan sharking to organized crime, the Court had a wide interpretation of the Commerce Clause. The 8-1 majority decision affirmed to the case that loan sharking, even if it was local, was often controlled by organized crime syndicates and generated revenue nationwide. However, Justice Stewart's dissent showed that letting the federal government control local crimes could take away more power from the states. And this showed in later years in the case of United States v. Lopez.

== Background ==
Perez was charged under the Title II of the Consumer Credit Protection Act of 1968. This was used to end extortionate credit transactions. A form of illegal lending which had been connected with loan sharking and organized crime. Perez had been heard of lending money at an excessive interest rate. To collect payments he would use threats, and come off as violent in order to get his money back. Perez had threatened a debtor and his family with extreme harm, this led to the debtor having to sell his business. The Title II of the Consumer Credit Protection Act of 1968 defined and criminalized the extortionate credit transactions which involved threats of violence in order to obtain money.

Loan sharking was known to involve people offering high-interest loans backed by the threat of intimidation or violence. They were believed to be tied to the operations of organized crime syndicates. Congress passed the Act in response to a large growing concern that illegal lending activities were victimizing individuals at a local level, while also helping fund larger organized crime networks. However, there was no direct connection to any interstate transaction in New York.

== Argument ==
There was a large question throughout the Perez v. United States case. Whether or not Congress had the constitutional authority to regulate local criminal activity under the Commerce Clause. The defense behind Perez argued that his actions did not cross state lines and had no connection to interstate commerce. Loan sharking was a local matter that should be handled by state law. The federal government being involved was overreaching its constitutional powers. There was large concern from the defense that allowing Congress to regulate local crimes would set a precedent for unlimited federal control over all aspects of criminal law. This interpretation of the Commerce Clause could upset a balance of federalism.

The federal government countered that Perez's activities were part of a larger economic pattern that Congress had authority in regulating. Loan sharking served as a key financial mechanism for organized crime, and this case showed that.

In order to support decisions, the government drew on prior Supreme Court Case Decisions, like Wickard v. Filburn and Heart of Atlanta Motel v. United States. These were other cases that upheld federal regulation of local activities with an effect on interstate commerce.

== Legal proceedings ==
After the conviction, Perez went on to appeal to the United States Court of Appeals for the Second Circuit. His attorneys argued that the federal government exceeded the constitutional authority by prosecuting a case with no proven connection to interstate commerce. The appeals court upheld this conviction, showing that Congress did have power to regulate local conduct.

This case reached the Supreme Court of the United States, where they were asked to determine if the Commerce Clause provided a constitutional basis for Congress to criminalize loan sharking that was intrastate in the nature. The Oral arguments were heard on January 11, 1971, and reached many as it showed the government's campaign against organized crime.

== Supreme Court decision ==
On April 26, 1971, the Supreme Court issues its decision in Perez v. United States in an 8-1 ruling convicting Perez. Justice William O. Douglas concluded that Congress had the power under Commerce Clause to regulate local loan sharking when it forms part of a larger pattern of economic activity that has a negative impact. There were many detailed finding during the legislative process showing the credit transactions and being closely engaged with organized crime.

=== Majority decision ===
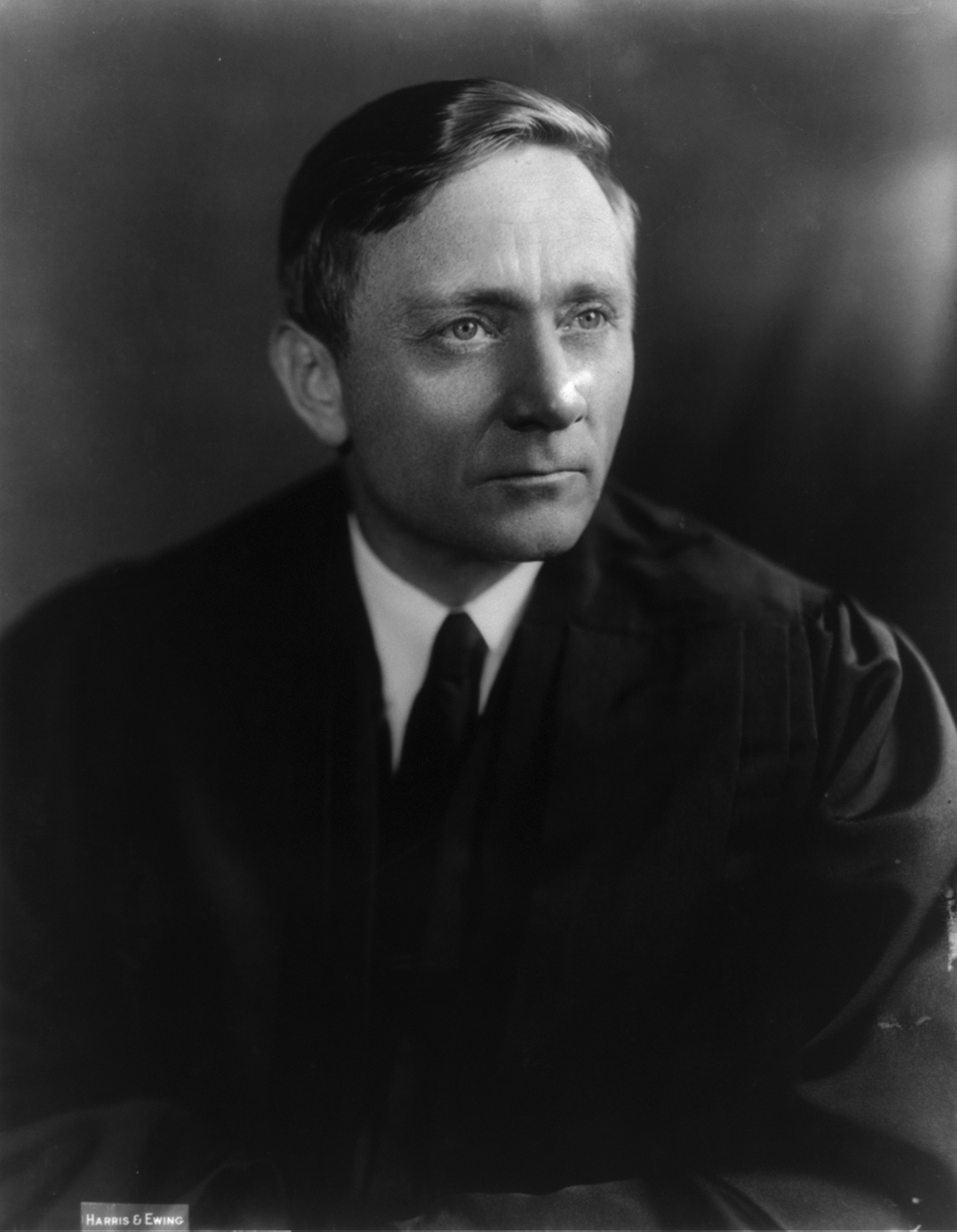
Justice William O. Douglas authored the majority opinion of the Court.

In an 8-1 decision, Justice Douglas agreed with Congress and said that even if one loan sharking case seems local, the government still has authority to make laws about it if many similar cases together affect the national economy. The Court held that Congress acted within their constitutional authority under the Commerce Clause. This decision was supported by a case from Wickard v. Filburn (1942), where the Court ruled that Congress could regulate wheat grown for personal use because it could lead to an effect on interstate commerce.

The idea that Congress's Commerce Clause power extends not only to economic activities but also local activities has been reinforced. In order to address organized crime through economic regulation, federal authority could no now be used.

=== Dissenting opinion ===
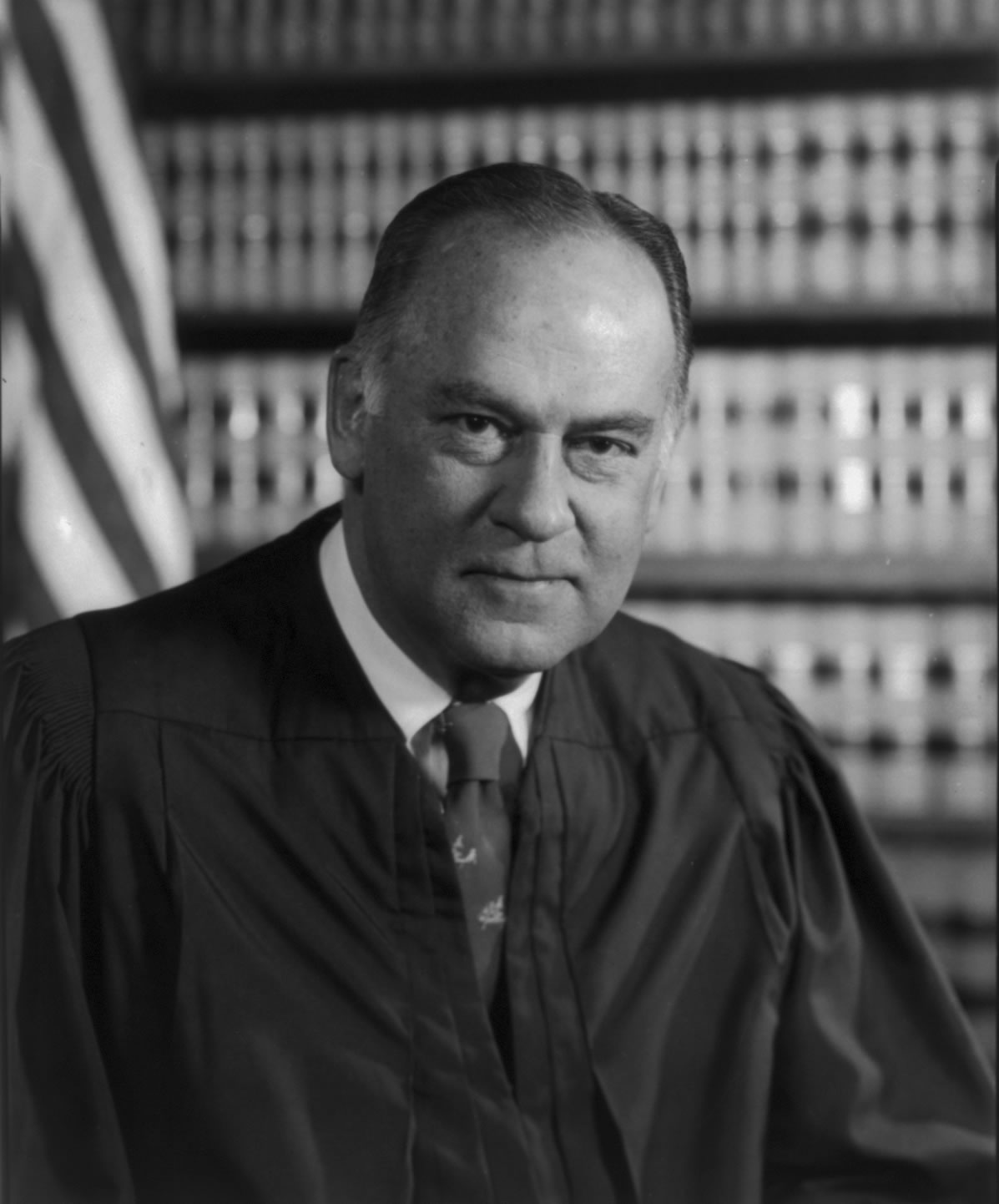
Justice Potter Stewart authored the dissent.

Justice Stewart challenged the majority's view of the Commerce Clause. Stewart argued that Perez's conduct was only local. There was no evidence of any connection to interstate commerce. The court's reasoning gave Congress unlimited power to criminalize the activity. There was a large concern of federalization of criminal law. He thought the government's argument relied more on assumptions rather than specific evidence.

== Significance and impact ==
Perez v. United States expanded the interpretation of the Commerce Clause while also allowing federal regulation of local criminal conduct if its part of a broader pattern that impacts interstate commerce. This case established that Congress can regulate classes of interstate activity based on an economic impact. Congress could now make laws about local activities, such as loan sharking, even if the actions don't cross state lines, the government could now step in if the overall problem is large enough.

United States v. Lopez (1995), also marked a huge shift in putting limits on how far Congress could go with the Commerce Clause. In this case, the Court agreed that the federal government couldn't make laws about local crimes unless there's a clear connection to a business related activity.

Perez v. United States allowed the federal government to step in on crimes that used to be only handled by states. Especially when these crimes could be tied to bigger national problems that we view worldwide.
