= Home Port Doctrine =

Principle of US law

The Home Port Doctrine is a principle in United States maritime law that restricts state and local governments from imposing property taxes on vessels engaged in interstate or foreign commerce, except in their designated home ports. This doctrine stems from the Commerce Clause of the U.S. Constitution, which grants Congress the authority to regulate commerce with foreign nations.

== Constitutional foundation ==
During the Constitutional Convention in 1787, delegates deliberated extensively on the federal government's role in regulating commerce and the limitations on state powers. A significant concern was preventing individual states from enacting protectionist measures that could hinder national economic unity. The Commerce Clause was introduced to empower Congress to oversee interstate and foreign commerce, ensuring uniformity and preventing discriminatory state legislation.

The Home Port Doctrine aligns with this constitutional framework by asserting that vessels should be taxed primarily at their home ports, thereby avoiding multiple taxation by various states—a scenario that could disrupt the free flow of commerce.

== Judicial interpretation ==
The U.S. Supreme Court has addressed the Home Port Doctrine in several cases, clarifying its application. In Hays v. Pacific Mail Steam-Ship Company (1855), the Court held that vessels owned by a New York corporation, operating between New York and San Francisco, were not subject to property taxation by California authorities. The Court reasoned that these vessels, although temporarily present in California ports, maintained their situs at their home port in New York, where the owners were liable for taxes on the capital invested. This decision established that vessels engaged in interstate commerce are taxable only in their home ports, preventing multiple states from imposing taxes on the same property.

In Japan Line, Ltd. v. County of Los Angeles (1979), the Court ruled that California's attempt to impose property taxes on Japanese shipping containers violated the Commerce Clause. The Court emphasized that such taxation could lead to multiple tax burdens on foreign commerce, undermining the nation's ability to “speak with one voice” in international trade matters.

Similarly, in Northwest Airlines, Inc. v. Minnesota (1944), the Court held that aircraft are taxable only in their home states, reinforcing the doctrine's applicability to various modes of transportation involved in interstate and foreign commerce.
