= McGautha v. California =

- Supreme Court of the United States

Argued November 9, 1970 Decided May 3, 1971
- Full case name: McGautha v. California
- Citations: 402 U.S. 183 (more) 91 S. Ct. 1454; 28 L. Ed. 2d 711; 1971 U.S. LEXIS 107

Holding
- (1) Untrammeled discretion of the jury the power to pronounce life or death in capital cases is constitutional. (2) Having the issues of guilt and punishment resolved in a single trial was constitutional.

Court membership
- Chief Justice Warren E. Burger Associate Justices Hugo Black · William O. Douglas; John M. Harlan II · William J. Brennan Jr. Potter Stewart · Byron White; Thurgood Marshall · Harry Blackmun

Case opinions
- Majority: Harlan, joined by Burger, Stewart, White, Blackmun
- Concurrence: Black
- Dissent: Douglas, joined by Brennan, Marshall
- Dissent: Brennan, joined by Douglas, Marshall

Laws applied
- U.S. Const. amend. VIII
- Superseded by
- Furman v. Georgia (1972)

McGautha v. California, 402 U.S. 183 (1971), is a criminal case heard by the United States Supreme Court, in which the Court held that the lack of legal standards by which juries imposed the death penalty was not an unconstitutional violation of the Due Process Clause portions of the Fourteenth Amendment. Justice Harlan wrote that writing rules for jury death penalty decisions was beyond current human ability. The context was public and philosophical scrutiny of the unequal application of the death penalty, especially in that blacks who killed whites were much more likely to have a death penalty imposed. McGautha was superseded one year later by Furman v. Georgia.
