= Commerce Clause =

Clause in the U.S. constitution

The Commerce Clause describes an enumerated power listed in the United States Constitution (Article I, Section 8, Clause 3). The clause states that the United States Congress shall have power "to regulate Commerce with foreign Nations, and among the several States, and with the Indian Tribes". Courts and commentators have tended to discuss each of these three areas of commerce as a separate power granted to Congress. It is common to see the individual components of the Commerce Clause referred to under specific terms: the Foreign Commerce Clause, the Interstate Commerce Clause, and the Indian Commerce Clause.

Dispute exists within the courts as to the range of powers granted to Congress by the Commerce Clause. As noted below, it is often paired with the Necessary and Proper Clause, and the combination used to take a more broad, expansive perspective of these powers.

During the Marshall Court era (1801–1835), interpretation of the Commerce Clause gave Congress jurisdiction over numerous aspects of intrastate and interstate commerce as well as activity that had traditionally been regarded not to be commerce. Starting in 1937, following the end of the Lochner era, the use of the Commerce Clause by Congress to authorize federal control of economic matters became effectively unlimited. The US Supreme Court restricted congressional use of the Commerce Clause somewhat with United States v. Lopez (1995).

The Commerce Clause is the source of federal drug prohibition laws under the Controlled Substances Act. In a 2005 medical marijuana case, Gonzales v. Raich, the U.S. Supreme Court rejected the argument that the ban on growing medical marijuana for personal use exceeded the powers of Congress under the Commerce Clause. Even if no goods were sold or transported across state lines, the Court found that there could be an indirect effect on interstate commerce and relied heavily on a New Deal case, Wickard v. Filburn, which held that the government may regulate personal cultivation and consumption of crops because the aggregate effect of individual consumption could have an indirect effect on interstate commerce.

== Text and pairing ==
Article I, Section 8, Clause 3:

[The Congress shall have Power] To regulate Commerce with foreign Nations, and among the several States, and with the Indian Tribes;

The significance of the Commerce Clause is described in the Supreme Court's opinion in Gonzales v. Raich, 545 U.S. 1 (2005):

The Commerce Clause emerged as the Framers' response to the central problem giving rise to the Constitution itself: the absence of any federal commerce power under the Articles of Confederation. For the first century of our history, the primary use of the Clause was to preclude the kind of discriminatory state legislation that had once been permissible. Then, in response to rapid industrial development and an increasingly interdependent national economy, Congress "ushered in a new era of federal regulation under the commerce power," beginning with the enactment of the Interstate Commerce Act in 1887 and the Sherman Antitrust Act in 1890.

The Commerce Clause represents one of the most fundamental powers delegated to the Congress by the founders. The outer limits of the Interstate Commerce Clause power have been the subject of long, intense political controversy. Interpretation of the sixteen words of the Commerce Clause has helped define the balance of power between the federal government and the states and the balance of power between the two elected branches of the federal government and the Judiciary. As such, it directly affects the lives of American citizens.

=== "Indian Tribes" ===
In his 1820 State of the Union Address, president James Monroe said:

With the Indians peace has been preserved and a progress made in carrying into effect the act of Congress making an appropriation for their civilization, with the prospect of favorable results. As connected equally with both these objects, our trade with those tribes is thought to merit the attention of Congress.

In their original state game is their sustenance and war their occupation, and if they find no employment from civilized powers they destroy each other. Left to themselves their extirpation is inevitable.

By a judicious regulation of our trade with them we supply their wants, administer to their comforts, and gradually, as the game retires, draw them to us. By maintaining posts far in the interior we acquire a more thorough and direct control over them, without which it is confidently believed that a complete change in their manners can never be accomplished. By such posts, aided by a proper regulation of our trade with them and a judicious civil administration over them, to be provided for by law, we shall, it is presumed, be enabled not only to protect our own settlements from their savage incursions and preserve peace among the several tribes, but accomplish also the great purpose of their civilization.

=== Significance in federal rights in navigable waters ===
The Commerce Clause provides comprehensive powers to the United States over navigable waters. The powers are critical to understand the rights of landowners adjoining or exercising what would otherwise be riparian rights under the common law. The Commerce Clause confers a unique position upon the federal government in connection with navigable waters: "The power to regulate commerce comprehends the control for that purpose, and to the extent necessary, of all the navigable waters of the United States.... For this purpose they are the public property of the nation, and subject to all the requisite legislation by Congress." United States v. Rands, 389 U.S. 121 (1967). The Rands decision continues:

This power to regulate navigation confers upon the United States a dominant servitude, FPC v. Niagara Mohawk Power Corp., 347 U.S. 239, 249 (1954), which extends to the entire stream and the stream bed below ordinary high-water mark. The proper exercise of this power is not an invasion of any private property rights in the stream or the lands underlying it, for the damage sustained does not result from taking property from riparian owners within the meaning of the Fifth Amendment but from the lawful exercise of a power to which the interests of riparian owners have always been subject. United States v. Chicago, M., St. P. & P. R. Co., 312 U.S. 592, 596–597 (1941); Gibson v. United States, 166 U.S. 269, 275–276 (1897). Thus, without being constitutionally obligated to pay compensation, the United States may change the course of a navigable stream, South Carolina v. Georgia, 93 U.S. 4 (1876), or otherwise impair or destroy a riparian owner's access to navigable waters, Gibson v. United States, 166 U.S. 269 (1897); Scranton v. Wheeler, 179 U.S. 141 (1900); United States v. Commodore Park, Inc., 324 U.S. 386 (1945), even though the market value of the riparian owner's land is substantially diminished.

Some scholars, such as Robert H. Bork and Daniel E. Troy, argue that prior to 1887, the Commerce Clause was rarely invoked by Congress and so a broad interpretation of the word "commerce" was clearly never intended by the Founding Fathers. In support of that claim, they argue that the word "commerce," as used in the Constitutional Convention and the Federalist Papers, can be substituted with either "trade" or "exchange" interchangeably and still preserve the meaning of those statements. They also point to James Madison's statement in an 1828 letter that the "Constitution vests in Congress expressly... 'the power to regulate trade'."

Examining contemporaneous dictionaries does not neatly resolve the matter. For instance, the 1792 edition of Samuel Johnson's A Dictionary of the English Language defines the noun "commerce" narrowly as "[e]xchange of one thing for another; interchange of any thing; trade; traffick," but it defines the corresponding verb "to commerce" more broadly as "[t]o hold intercourse." The word "intercourse" also had a different and wider meaning back in 1792, compared to today.

Nevertheless, in Gibbons v. Ogden (1824), the Court ruled unanimously that congressional power extends to regulation over navigable waters.

=== Early years (1800s–1830s) ===
Chief Justice John Marshall ruled in Gibbons v. Ogden (1824) that the power to regulate interstate commerce also included the power to regulate interstate navigation: "Commerce, undoubtedly is traffic, but it is something more—it is intercourse.... [A] power to regulate navigation is as expressly granted, as if that term had been added to the word 'commerce'.... [T]he power of Congress does not stop at the jurisdictional lines of the several states. It would be a very useless power if it could not pass those lines." The Court's decision contains language supporting one important line of Commerce Clause jurisprudence, the idea that the electoral process of representative government represents the primary limitation on the exercise of the Commerce Clause powers:

The wisdom and the discretion of Congress, their identity with the people, and the influence which their constituents possess at elections, are, in this, as in many other instances, as that, for example, of declaring war, the sole restraints on which they have relied, to secure them from its abuse. They are the restraints on which the people must often rely solely, in all representative governments....

In Gibbons, the Court struck down New York State's attempt to grant a steamboat monopoly to Robert Fulton, which he had then ultimately franchised to Ogden, who claimed river traffic was not "commerce" under the Commerce Clause and that Congress could not interfere with New York State's grant of an exclusive monopoly within its own borders. Ogden's assertion was untenable: he contended that New York could control river traffic within New York all the way to the border with New Jersey and that New Jersey could control river traffic within New Jersey all the way to the border with New York, leaving Congress with the power to control the traffic as it crossed the state line.

Thus, Ogden contended, Congress could not invalidate his monopoly if transported passengers only within New York. The Supreme Court, however, found that Congress could invalidate his monopoly since it was operational on an interstate channel of navigation.

In its decision, the Court assumed interstate commerce required movement of the subject of regulation across state borders. The decision contains the following principles, some of which have since been altered by subsequent decisions:

- Commerce is "intercourse, all its branches, and is regulated by prescribing rules for carrying on that intercourse."
- Commerce among the states cannot stop at the external boundary of each state, but may be introduced into the interior.
- Congress can regulate, that is "to prescribe the rule by which commerce is to be governed" that "may be exercised to its utmost extent, and acknowledges no limitations other than are prescribed in the Constitution."

Additionally, the Marshall Court limited the extent of federal maritime and admiralty jurisdiction to tidewaters in The Steam-Boat Thomas Jefferson Johnson.

=== Tribal sovereignty ===
In Cherokee Nation v. Georgia, 30 U.S. 1 (1831), the Supreme Court addressed whether the Cherokee nation is a foreign state in the sense in which that term is used in the U.S. constitution. The Court provided a definition of Indian tribe that clearly made the rights of tribes far inferior to those of foreign states:

Though the Indians are acknowledged to have an unquestionable, and, heretofore, unquestioned right to the lands they occupy, until that right shall be extinguished by a voluntary cession to our government; yet it may well be doubted whether those tribes which reside within the acknowledged boundaries of the United States can, with strict accuracy, be denominated foreign nations. They may, more correctly be denominated domestic dependent nations. They occupy a territory to which we assert a title independent of their will, which must take effect in point of possession when their right of possession ceases. Meanwhile, they are in a state of pupilage. Their relation to the United States resembles that of a ward to his guardian.

=== Dormant Commerce Clause jurisprudence ===
As explained in United States v. Lopez, 514 U.S. 549 (1995), "For nearly a century thereafter [that is, after Gibbons], the Court's Commerce Clause decisions dealt but rarely with the extent of Congress' power, and almost entirely with the Commerce Clause as a limit on state legislation that discriminated against interstate commerce." Under this line of precedent, the Court held that certain categories of activity such as "exhibitions", "production", "manufacturing", and "mining" were within the province of state governments, and thus were beyond the power of Congress under the Commerce Clause. When Congress began to engage in economic regulation on a national scale, the Court's dormant Commerce Clause decisions influenced its approach to Congressional regulation.

In this context, the Court took a formalistic approach, which distinguished between services and commerce, manufacturing and commerce, direct and indirect effects on commerce, and local and national activities. See concurring opinion of Justice Kennedy in United States v. Lopez. ("One approach the Court used to inquire into the lawfulness of state authority was to draw content-based or subject-matter distinctions, thus defining by semantic or formalistic categories those activities that were commerce and those that were not.") In Welton v. State of Missouri (1875), corporations gained Commerce Clause protections. The Dormant Commerce Clause formalisms spilled over into its Article I jurisprudence. While Congress had the power to regulate commerce, it could not regulate manufacturing, which was seen as being entirely local. In Kidd v. Pearson, 128 U.S. 1 (1888), the Court struck a federal law which prohibited the manufacture of liquor for shipment across state lines. Similar decisions were issued with regard to agriculture, mining, oil production, and generation of electricity. In Swift v. United States, 196 U.S. 375 (1905), the Court ruled that the clause covered meatpackers; although their activity was geographically "local", they had an important effect on the "current of commerce", and thus could be regulated under the Commerce Clause. The Court's decision halted price fixing. Stafford v. Wallace, 258 U.S. 495 (1922), upheld a federal law (the Packers and Stockyards Act) regulating the Chicago meatpacking industry, because the industry was part of the interstate commerce of beef from ranchers to dinner tables. The stockyards "are but a throat through which the current [of commerce] flows," Chief Justice Taft wrote, referring to the stockyards as "great national public utilities." As Justice Kennedy wrote: (in a concurring opinion to United States v. Lopez), "Though that [formalistic] approach likely would not have survived even if confined to the question of a State's authority to enact legislation, it was not at all propitious when applied to the quite different question of what subjects were within the reach of the national power when Congress chose to exercise it."

Similarly, the Court excluded most services by distinguishing them from commerce. In Federal Baseball Club v. National League, 259 U.S. 200 (1922), which was later upheld in Toolson v. New York Yankees (1953) and Flood v. Kuhn (1973), the Court excluded services not related to production, such as live entertainment, from the definition of commerce:

That to which it is incident, the exhibition, although made for money, would not be called trade of commerce in the commonly accepted use of those words. As it is put by defendant, personal effort not related to production is not a subject of commerce.

=== New Deal ===
In 1935, the Supreme Court decision in Schecter Poultry Corporation v. United States invalidated regulations of the poultry industry according to the nondelegation doctrine and as an invalid use of Congress's power under the commerce clause. The unanimous decision rendered unconstitutional the National Industrial Recovery Act, a main component of President Franklin Roosevelt's New Deal. Again in 1936, in Carter v. Carter Coal Company, the Supreme Court struck down a key element of the New Deal's regulation of the mining industry on the grounds that mining was not "commerce." In the preceding decades, the Court had struck down a laundry list of progressive legislation: minimum-wage laws, child labor laws, agricultural relief laws, and virtually every other element of the New Deal legislation that had come before it. After winning re-election in 1936, Roosevelt proposed the Judicial Procedures Reform Bill of 1937 to allow the President to appoint an additional Justice for each sitting Justice over age 70. Given the age of the current justices, that would allow a Supreme Court of up to 15 Justices. Roosevelt claimed that to be intended to lessen the load on the older Justices, rather than an attempt to achieve a majority that would cease to strike his New Deal acts.

Ultimately, there was widespread opposition to the "court packing" plan, and in the end, Roosevelt abandoned it. However, in what became known as "the switch in time that saved nine," Justice Owen Roberts, shortly after the "court packing" plan was proposed, joined the 5-4 majority opinion in West Coast Hotel Co. v. Parrish (1937). It narrowly upheld a Washington state minimum wage law, abandoning prior jurisprudence, and ended the Lochner era. That essentially marked the beginning of the end of Supreme Court's opposition to the New Deal, which also obviated the "court packing" scheme.

In United States v. Darby Lumber Co. (1941), the Court upheld the Fair Labor Standards Act, which regulated the production of goods shipped across state lines. It stated that the Tenth Amendment "is but a truism" and was not considered to be an independent limitation on congressional power.

In United States v. Wrightwood Dairy Co. (1942), the Court upheld federal price regulation of intrastate milk commerce:

The commerce power is not confined in its exercise to the regulation of commerce among the states. It extends to those activities intrastate which so affect interstate commerce, or the exertion of the power of Congress over it, as to make regulation of them appropriate means to the attainment of a legitimate end, the effective execution of the granted power to regulate interstate commerce.... The power of Congress over interstate commerce is plenary and complete in itself, may be exercised to its utmost extent, and acknowledges no limitations other than are prescribed in the Constitution.... It follows that no form of state activity can constitutionally thwart the regulatory power granted by the commerce clause to Congress. Hence, the reach of that power extends to those intrastate activities which in a substantial way interfere with or obstruct the exercise of the granted power.

In Wickard v. Filburn (1942), the Court upheld the Agricultural Adjustment Act of 1938, which sought to stabilize wide fluctuations in the market price for wheat. The Court found that Congress could apply national quotas to wheat grown on one's own land for one's own consumption because the total of such local production and consumption could potentially be sufficiently large as to affect the overall national goal of stabilizing prices. The Court cited its recent Wrightwood decision and decided, "Whether the subject of the regulation in question was 'production,' 'consumption,' or 'marketing' is, therefore, not material for purposes of deciding the question of federal power before us." The Court reiterated Chief Justice Marshall's decision in Gibbons: "He made emphatic the embracing and penetrating nature of this power by warning that effective restraints on its exercise must proceed from political, rather than from judicial, processes." The Court also stated, "The conflicts of economic interest between the regulated and those who advantage by it are wisely left under our system to resolution by the Congress under its more flexible and responsible legislative process. Such conflicts rarely lend themselves to judicial determination. And with the wisdom, workability, or fairness, of the plan of regulation, we have nothing to do."

Thereafter, the Court began to defer to the Congress on the theory that determining whether legislation affected commerce appropriately was a decision that was political and legislative, not judicial. That overall change in the Court's jurisprudence, beginning with Parrish, is often referred to as the Constitutional Revolution of 1937, in which the Court shifted from exercising judicial review of legislative acts to protect economic rights to a paradigm that focused most strongly on protecting civil liberties.

It was not until United States v. Lopez (1995) decision, after nearly 60 years of leaving any restraint on the use of the Commerce Clause to political means, that the Court again ruled that a regulation enacted under the Commerce Clause was unconstitutional.

=== Civil rights ===
The wide interpretation of the scope of the Commerce Clause continued following the passing of the Civil Rights Act of 1964, which aimed to prevent business from discriminating against black customers. The Supreme Court issued several opinions supporting that use of the Commerce Clause. Heart of Atlanta Motel v. United States, 379 U.S. 241 (1964), ruled that Congress could regulate a business that served mostly interstate travelers. Daniel v. Paul, 395 U.S. 298 (1969), ruled that the federal government could regulate a recreational facility because three of the four items sold at its snack bar were purchased from outside the state.

== United States v. Lopez ==
=== Change in jurisprudence ===
Starting in 1995, the Rehnquist Court's revived federalism, as evident in its 5–4 decision in United States v. Lopez, enforced strict limits to congressional power under the Commerce Clause. In Lopez, the Court struck down the Gun-Free School Zones Act of 1990. It was the first time in almost 60 years that the Court had struck down a federal law for exceeding the limits of the Commerce Clause. In the case, the Court was confronted with the conviction of a high school student for carrying a concealed handgun into school in violation of the act.

In striking down the federal law, the majority opinion explained:

[The Gun-Free School Zones Act] is a criminal statute that by its terms has nothing to do with "commerce" or any sort of economic enterprise, however broadly one might define those terms. [The act] is not an essential part of a larger regulation of economic activity, in which the regulatory scheme could be undercut unless the intrastate activity were regulated. It cannot, therefore, be sustained under our cases upholding regulations of activities that arise out of or are connected with a commercial transaction, which viewed in the aggregate, substantially affects interstate commerce.

=== The Lopez rule ===
The opinion set a new rule for what was an acceptable use of congressional power under the Commerce Clause:

- Congress may regulate the use of the channels of interstate commerce;
- Congress is empowered to regulate and protect the instrumentalities of interstate commerce, or persons or things in Interstate Commerce, even though the threat may come only from intrastate activities;
- Congress's commerce authority includes the power to regulate those activities having a substantial relation to interstate commerce (activities that substantially affect interstate commerce).

==== Channels of commerce and the instrumentalities of interstate commerce ====
Channels of commerce represent a broad congressional power that directly regulates the movement of goods and people across state lines. Importantly, the Court has never required a nexus (causal link) between a state border crossing and the engagement in an activity prohibited by Congress. In United States v. Sullivan (1948), the Court held that Section 301k of the Federal Food, Drug, and Cosmetic Act, which prohibited the misbranding of pharmaceutical drugs transported in interstate commerce, did not exceed the congressional commerce power because Congress has the power to "keep the channels of such commerce free from the transportation of illicit or harmful articles." Topics in this category include mailing or shipping in interstate commerce, prohibiting crimes where the individual crossed a state line to commit the act, and explosives.

The instrumentalities category allows Congress to make regulations in regards to "the safety, efficiency, and accessibility of the nationwide transportation and communications networks." It is a significant basis for congressional authority however it has not been fully occupied by Congress.

==== Substantial impact on interstate commerce ====
The substantial impact (or substantial affect) category relates to the power discussed in the Court's 1942 decision in Wickard v. Filburn. It is arguably the strongest categorical power in the Lopez rule. In essence, it relates to economic activities which, in the aggregate, have a substantial impact on interstate commerce. The Court has stopped short of establishing a rule prohibiting the aggregation of all non-economic activity.

In determining whether the activity Congress is attempting to regulate has a substantial effect on interstate commerce, reviewing courts typically consider the following factors:

(1) whether the regulated activity is commercial or economic in nature; (2) whether an express jurisdictional element is provided in the statute to limit its reach; (3) whether Congress made express findings about the effects of the proscribed activity on interstate commerce; and (4) whether the link between the prohibited activity and the effect on interstate commerce is attenuated.

== Other Rehnquist Court decisions ==
=== United States v. Morrison ===
Lopez was clarified by the Rehnquist Court in United States v. Morrison, 529 U.S. 598 (2000). In Morrison, the Court invalidated § 40302 of the Violence Against Women Act ("VAWA"), which created civil liability for the commission of a gender-based violent crime but without any jurisdictional requirement of a connection to interstate commerce or to commercial activity. Once again, the Court stated it was presented with a congressional attempt to criminalize traditional local criminal conduct. As in Lopez, it could not be argued that state regulation alone would be ineffective to protect the aggregate effects of local violence. The Court explained that in both Lopez and Morrison, "the noneconomic, criminal nature of the conduct at issue was central to our decision." Furthermore, the Court pointed out that neither case had "'express jurisdictional element which might limit its reach (to those instances that) have an explicit connection with or effect on interstate commerce.'" In both cases, Congress criminalized activity that was not commercial in nature without including a jurisdictional element establishing the necessary connection between the criminalized activity and interstate commerce.

=== New Federalism and Gonzales v. Raich ===
The Rehnquist Court's Commerce Clause cases helped establish the doctrine of "New Federalism." The Court's New Federalism doctrine was focused on reining in congressional powers in order to re-strengthen the powers of the individual states which had been weakened during the New Deal era. Members on the Rehnquist Court theorized that by re-apportioning power back to the states, individual liberty was strengthened. In contrast, Erwin Chemerinsky believes that limiting the commerce power as the Rehnquist Court did can only lead to the weakening of individual liberties.

The outer limits of the New Federalism doctrine were delineated by Gonzales v. Raich in which Justices Antonin Scalia and Anthony Kennedy departed from their previous positions in the Lopez and Morrison to uphold a federal law regarding marijuana. The Court found the federal law valid although the marijuana in question had been grown and consumed within a single state and had never entered interstate commerce. The court held Congress may regulate an intrastate economic good as part of a complete scheme of legislation designed to regulate interstate commerce.

Since the Rehnquist Court, the Tenth Amendment to the Constitution has once again played an integral part in the Court's view of the Commerce Clause. The Tenth Amendment states that the federal government has the powers specifically delegated to it by the Constitution and that other powers are reserved to the states or to the people. The Commerce Clause is an important source of those powers delegated to Congress and so its interpretation is very important in determining the scope of federal power in controlling innumerable aspects of American life. The Commerce Clause has been the most broadly-interpreted clause in the Constitution, making way for many laws that some argue, contradict the original intended meaning of the Constitution. Justice Thomas has gone so far as to state in his dissent to Gonzales,

Respondents Diane Monson and Angel Raich use marijuana that has never been bought or sold, that has never crossed state lines, and that has had no demonstrable effect on the national market for marijuana. If Congress can regulate this under the Commerce Clause, then it can regulate virtually anything – and the federal Government is no longer one of limited and enumerated powers.

=== Indian affairs ===
The Rehnquist court upheld Congress's plenary authority to legislate in Indian affairs that was derived from Worcester's interpretation of the Indian Commerce Clause, but it modified Worcester by giving the states some jurisdiction over Indian affairs beyond what had been granted to them by Congress. Another view is that the Court was compelled to define limits to address congressional legislation that sought to use the Commerce Clause power in new and unprecedented ways.

The Court found in Seminole Tribe v. Florida, 517 U.S. 44 (1996) that unlike the Fourteenth Amendment, the Commerce Clause does not give the federal government the power to abrogate the sovereign immunity of the states.

== Themes ==
=== Rational basis review ===
The evolving level of scrutiny applied by federal courts to cases involving the Commerce Clause should be considered in the context of rational basis review. The idea behind rational basis review is that the judiciary must show deference to the elected representatives of the people. A respect for the democratic process requires courts to uphold legislation if there are rational facts and reasons that could support congressional judgment, even if the justices would have come to different conclusions. Throughout the 20th century, in a variety of contexts, courts sought to avoid second guessing the legislative branch, and Commerce Clause jurisprudence can be seen as a part of that trend, as Laurence Tribe stated:

Since 1937, in applying the factual test in Jones & Laughlin to hold a broad range of activities sufficiently related to interstate commerce, the Supreme Court has exercised little independent judgment, choosing instead to defer to the expressed or implied findings of Congress to the effect that regulated activities have the requisite "economic effect". Such findings have been upheld whenever they could be said to rest upon some rational basis. (Citing Heart of Atlanta Motel, Inc. v United States (1964).)

Justice Rehnquist echoed that point in his opinion in United States v. Lopez by stating: "Since [Wickard], the Court has... undertaken to decide whether a rational basis existed for concluding that a regulated activity sufficiently affected interstate commerce. See, e.g., Hodel v. Virginia Surface Mining & Reclamation Association, 452 U.S. 264, 276–280 (1981); Perez v. United States, 402 U.S. 146, 155–156 (1971); Heart of Atlanta Motel, Inc. v. United States, 379 U.S. 241, 252–253 (1964)."

Rational basis review begins with establishing the factual predicate upon which the exercise of congressional power is based. The factual basis might come from a variety of sources. It might come from factual determinations made by Congress, passed in the legislation itself, or found in the congressional reports that are issued to accompany the legislation. It might come from the record of testimony compiled in committee hearings. It might come from facts posited by proponents in their briefs in support of the legislation. For example, the Court referenced extensive testimony presented in hearings in support of the conclusion that discrimination in public accommodations reduces interstate commerce. The Court wrote:

Of course, the mere fact that Congress has said when particular activity shall be deemed to affect commerce does not preclude further examination by this Court. But where we find that the legislators, in light of the facts and testimony before them, have a rational basis for finding a chosen regulatory scheme necessary to the protection of commerce, our investigation is at an end.

Similarly, in Gonzales v. Raich the Court upheld a ban on growing marijuana intended for medical use on the grounds that Congress could rationally conclude that such cultivation might make enforcement of drug laws more difficult by creating an otherwise-lawful source of marijuana that could be diverted into the illicit market:

In assessing the scope of Congress' authority under the Commerce Clause, we stress that the task before us is a modest one. We need not determine whether respondents' activities, taken in the aggregate, substantially affect interstate commerce in fact, but only whether a "rational basis" exists for so concluding. Given the enforcement difficulties that attend distinguishing between marijuana cultivated locally and marijuana grown elsewhere, 21 U.S.C. § 801(5), and concerns about diversion into illicit channels, we have no difficulty concluding that Congress had a rational basis for believing that failure to regulate the intrastate manufacture and possession of marijuana would leave a gaping hole in the CSA.

=== Role of the political process ===
Since its decision in Gibbons, the Supreme Court has held that Congress may regulate only those activities within a state that arise out of or are connected with a commercial transaction and that, viewed in the aggregate, substantially affect interstate commerce. Since judicial interpretations of constitutional limitations on Congressional exercise of its Commerce Clause powers represent an invasion of the democratic process which may not be overturned through ordinary democratic means, the Court has continued to assert that the primary limitation on the unwise exercise of Congressional Commerce Clause power by Congress must be found at the ballot box. Thus in Garcia v. San Antonio Metropolitan Transit Authority, 469 U.S. 528 (1985), the Court stated:

Of course, we continue to recognize that the States occupy a special and specific position in our constitutional system and that the scope of Congress' authority under the Commerce Clause must reflect that position. But the principal and basic limit on the federal commerce power is that inherent in all congressional action—the built-in restraints that our system provides through state participation in federal governmental action. The political process ensures that laws that unduly burden the States will not be promulgated.

=== Debate over applicability to Patient Protection and Affordable Care Act ===
Questions over the range and applicability of the Commerce Clause have arisen in debate over the constitutionality of the Patient Protection and Affordable Care Act ("PPACA"). The debate centers on whether Congress is authorized to require citizens to purchase health insurance from the private market, known as the individual mandate. Although Congress had invoked its authority from the Commerce Clause to enact the mandate, many opponents of the PPACA claim that the individual mandate exceeds Congress's authority, primarily on the position that the law attempts to define the nonpurchase of insurance as "commerce."

Twenty-six state attorneys general filed a lawsuit against the federal government and claimed that the insurance mandate is unconstitutional. On June 8, 2011, a panel of three judges from the 11th Circuit Court of Appeals in Atlanta held hearings on that issue. On August 12, 2011. The 11th Circuit Court of Appeals ruled the individual mandate to be unconstitutional and stated that Congress had exceeded its authority by requiring Americans to buy coverage.

Differing court opinions have clashed over the question of whether failure to purchase insurance can be considered an economic activity that affects interstate commerce. In Virginia v. Sebelius, Judge Henry Hudson overturned the law and claimed that failure to purchase health insurance coverage could not be considered economic activity but was economic "inactivity." In Liberty University v. Geithner, Judge Norman Moon upheld the law, countering:

Far from 'inactivity,' by choosing to forgo insurance, Plaintiffs are making an economic decision to try to pay for health care services later, out of pocket, rather than now, through the purchase of insurance. Similarly, in Thomas More Law Center v. Obama, judge George Steeh ruled that such decisions have "a documented impact on interstate commerce."

In response to the Virginia decision, Virginia Attorney General Ken Cuccinelli petitioned the Supreme Court to hear the appeal immediately, rather than going through the Fourth Circuit. On November 14, 2011, the Supreme Court announced that it would hear the case in the spring of 2012. The Supreme Court heard arguments on March 26–28, 2012. Its majority opinion agreed that upholding the PPACA under the commerce clause "would open a new and potentially vast domain to congressional authority" and that "the power to regulate commerce presupposes the existence of commercial activity to be regulated." The Court held that Congress did not have authority under the Commerce Clause to require citizens to purchase health insurance but still upheld the law's "individual mandate" provision under Congress's taxing authority.

== See also ==
- Australian commerce clause
- Dual federalism
- Home Port Doctrine
- National Recovery Administration
- Section 51(i) of the Constitution of Australia
- Section 91(2) of the Constitution Act, 1867 (Canadian Constitution)
