= United States v. Vuitch =

- Supreme Court of the United States

Argued January 12, 1971 Decided April 21, 1971
- Full case name: United States v. Vuitch
- Citations: 402 U.S. 62 (more) 91 S. Ct. 1294; 28 L. Ed. 2d 601; 1971 U.S. LEXIS 50

Case history
- Prior: 305 F. Supp. 1032 (D.D.C. 1969)

Holding
- The abortion statute of the District of Columbia, banning abortion except when necessary for the health or life of the woman, is not unconstitutionally vague.

Court membership
- Chief Justice Warren E. Burger Associate Justices Hugo Black · William O. Douglas; John M. Harlan II · William J. Brennan Jr. Potter Stewart · Byron White; Thurgood Marshall · Harry Blackmun

Case opinions
- Majority: Black, joined by Burger, White (in full); Douglas, Stewart (Part I (jurisdiction)); Harlan, Blackmun (Part II (merits))
- Concurrence: White
- Dissent: Douglas (as to merits)
- Dissent: Harlan, joined by Brennan, Marshall, Blackmun (as to jurisdiction)
- Dissent: Stewart (as to merits)
- Dissent: Blackmun (as to jurisdiction)

United States v. Vuitch, 402 U.S. 62 (1971), was a United States Supreme Court abortion rights case, which held that the District of Columbia's abortion law banning the practice except when necessary for the health or life of the woman was not unconstitutionally vague.

== Background ==
Milan Vuitch, an abortion provider in the District of Columbia, had several times come under suit for providing abortion services that the government deemed not necessary for the life or health of the woman, as required by the DC law. Vuitch challenged the law as being unconstitutionally vague with regard to the term "health;" the law did not define health in terms that would allow doctors to determine if their actions had broken the law. Federal District Judge Gerhard A. Gesell agreed, dismissing Vuitch's indictment and ruling that the law failed to give the sufficient certainty required by due process of law in criminal matters. Gesell's finding was the first federal court decision declaring an abortion law unconstitutional.

The United States appealed the decision directly to the Supreme Court.

== Decision ==
There were two questions before the court: firstly, whether the Supreme Court had jurisdiction to decide the case, and secondly, whether the D.C. law was unconstitutionally vague. On the first question, Justice Black, joined by Burger, Douglas, Stewart, and Byron White, held that they could. On the second question, Harlan and Blackmun, although dissenting in jurisdiction, joined Black on the merits, while Douglas and Stewart joined Brennan and Marshall in dissent.

On the merits, Black held that "health" was not vague, since lower courts had construed it fairly concretely to mean physical as well as psychological health. Although this was the final (as well as the first) abortion case prior to Roe, only Justice Douglas, writing in dissent, suggested the existence of a general right to abortion as part of a broader right to privacy. This view would be embraced by seven justices in Roe two years later.

== Significance ==
Vuitch lost in the sense that the statute was ruled not "vague"; the district court's decision was overturned and Vuitch could be prosecuted. However, the decision treated abortion as a surgical option not fundamentally different from any other, and the Court seemed to care most about sufficient leeway being given to a doctor's professional judgement.

The case was one of the first that the Supreme Court heard in regards to abortion restrictions in the United States. The justices voted to hear Roe v. Wade and Doe v. Bolton, other abortion cases, the day after Vuitch's opinion was announced.

== See also ==
- List of United States Supreme Court cases, volume 402
- Roe v. Wade (1973), decided just two terms after Vuitch
