= List of United States Supreme Court cases, volume 402 =

This is a list of all United States Supreme Court cases from volume 402 of the United States Reports:

Case name	Citation	Date decided
Swann v. Charlotte-Mecklenburg Bd. of Ed.	402 U.S. 1	1971
Davis v. Bd. of Sch. Comm'rs	402 U.S. 33	1971
McDaniel v. Barresi	402 U.S. 39	1971
N.C. Bd. of Ed. v. Swann	402 U.S. 43	1971
Moore v. Charlotte-Mecklenburg Bd. of Ed.	402 U.S. 47	1971
Rosenberg v. Yee Chien Woo	402 U.S. 49	1971
United States v. Vuitch	402 U.S. 62	1971
Ehlert v. United States	402 U.S. 99	1971
Cal. Dept. of Human Resources Development v. Java	402 U.S. 121	1971
James v. Valtierra	402 U.S. 137	1971
Perez v. United States	402 U.S. 146	1971
United States v. S. Ute Tribe	402 U.S. 159	1971
Keyes v. Sch. Dist.	402 U.S. 182	1971
McGautha v. California	402 U.S. 183	1971
Blonder-Tongue Laboratories, Inc. v. University of Illinois Foundation	402 U.S. 313	1971
United States v. Reidel	402 U.S. 351	1971
United States v. Thirty-seven Photographs	402 U.S. 363	1971
Richardson v. Perales	402 U.S. 389	1971
Org. for a Better Austin v. Keefe	402 U.S. 415	1971
California v. Byers	402 U.S. 424	1971
McGee v. United States	402 U.S. 479	1971
Triangle Improvement Council v. Ritchie	402 U.S. 497	1971
Astrup v. INS	402 U.S. 509	1971
Gainesville Util. Dept. v. Fla. Power Corp.	402 U.S. 515	1971
United States v. Ryan	402 U.S. 530	1971
Bell v. Burson	402 U.S. 535	1971
Due process requires that the holder of a driver's license be given notice and an opportunity for a hearing prior to revocation.
Palmer v. City of Euclid	402 U.S. 544	1971
Bostic v. United States	402 U.S. 547	1971
United States v. Greater Buffalo Press, Inc.	402 U.S. 549	1971
United States v. Int'l Minerals & Chem. Corp.	402 U.S. 558	1971
Chi. & Nw. R.R. Co. v. Transp. Union	402 U.S. 570	1971
NLRB v. Natural Gas Util. Dist.	402 U.S. 600	1971
Coates v. City of Cincinnati	402 U.S. 611	1971
Nelson v. O'Neil	402 U.S. 622	1971
Perez v. Campbell	402 U.S. 637	1971
United States v. Armour & Co.	402 U.S. 673	1971
Dewey v. Reynolds Metals Co.	402 U.S. 689	1971
Connor v. Johnson	402 U.S. 690	1971
