= Blonder-Tongue Laboratories, Inc. v. University of Illinois Foundation =

- Supreme Court of the United States

Argued January 14, 1971 Decided May 3, 1971
- Full case name: Blonder-Tongue Laboratories, Inc. v. University of Illinois Foundation, et al.
- Docket no.: 338
- Citations: 402 U.S. 313 (more) 91 S. Ct. 1434; 28 L. Ed. 2d 788; 1971 U.S. LEXIS 119; 169 U.S.P.Q. 513, 1971 Trade Cases (CCH) ¶ 73,565

Case history
- Prior: 422 F.2d 769 (7th Cir. 1970); cert. granted, 400 U.S. 864 (1970).
- Subsequent: On remand, 334 F. Supp. 47 (N.D. Ill. 1971); affirmed, 465 F.2d 380 (7th Cir. 1972); cert. denied, 409 U.S. 1061 (1972).

Holding
- Any judgement that a patent is invalid is conclusive in all future cases about that patent, so long as the patent holder had a full and fair opportunity to litigate the issue in the first judgement.

Court membership
- Chief Justice Warren E. Burger Associate Justices Hugo Black · William O. Douglas; John M. Harlan II · William J. Brennan Jr. Potter Stewart · Byron White; Thurgood Marshall · Harry Blackmun

Case opinion
- Majority: White, joined by unanimous
- This case overturned a previous ruling or rulings
- Triplett v. Lowell, 402 U.S. 313 (1936)

Blonder-Tongue Laboratories, Inc. v. University of Illinois Foundation, 402 U.S. 313 (1971), is a decision of the United States Supreme Court holding that a final judgment in an infringement suit against a first defendant that a patent is invalid thereafter bars the patentee from relitigating the same patent against other defendants. In so ruling, the Supreme Court overruled its 1936 decision in Triplett v. Lowell, which had required mutuality of estoppel to bar such preclusion, and held that the better view was to prevent relitigating if the plaintiff had had a full and fair opportunity to litigate the issue in question.

== Background ==
Isbell antenna involved in lawsuit

The University of Illinois Foundation owned Isbell U.S. Patent No. 3,210,767, covering "Frequency Independent Unidirectional Antennas," which were used for transmission and reception of radio and television signals. The Foundation sued Winegard Co., an antenna manufacturer in Iowa, and the court held the patent invalid as obvious. On appeal, the Eighth Circuit affirmed the judgment in the Iowa case.

The Foundation also sued a customer of another antenna manufacturer, Blonder-Tongue, in Illinois. Blonder-Tongue intervened to defend its customer and filed a counterclaim for invalidity. The Illinois court held the patent valid and infringed, despite the contrary ruling in Iowa, because it disagreed with the conclusion that the Iowa court reached in the case against Winegard. Blonder-Tongue appealed to the Seventh Circuit, which upheld the ruling that the Isbell patent was valid and infringed.

Blonder-Tongue then appealed to the Supreme Court. Under prior law, a patentee was entitled to sue an alleged infringer, even though a different court had ruled the patent invalid: The second court was free to decide the second case on the basis of the evidence before it, irrespective of the first court's ruling, according to Triplett v. Lowell. The Supreme Court granted certiorari to decide the question, "Should the holding of Triplett v. Lowell, 297 U. S. 638, that a determination of patent invalidity is not res judicata as against the patentee in subsequent litigation against a different defendant, be adhered to?"—even though Blonder-Tongue had asked the Court to rule only on the merits of the patentee's infringement case.

== Ruling of Supreme Court ==
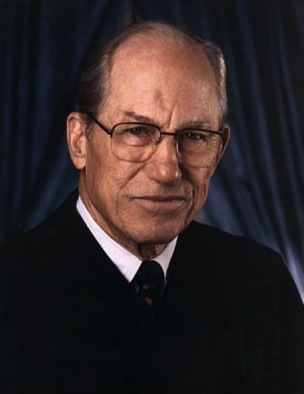
Justice Byron White

Justice Byron White delivered the opinion of a unanimous Court that Triplett should be overruled and that patent owners should be entitled to only one bite at the apple, because the doctrine requiring mutuality of estoppel—that both parties must be bound by the prior judgment or neither party is bound—was contrary to public policy, at least in patent cases.

White began by noting that the doctrine allowing multiple litigation on a patent held invalid had been criticized, yet both parties' patent lawyers in this case were unwilling to ask for Triplett to be overruled. White quoted Blonder-Tongue's counsel as saying, "Though petitioners stand to gain by any such result, we cannot urge the destruction of a long-accepted safeguard for patentees merely for the expediency of victory." The Assistant Attorney General of the Antitrust Division, however, arguing for the Government as amicus curiae, urged the Court to overrule Triplett partially—to permit or preclude relitigating patents on a case-by-case fact-specific basis.

A preliminary question was whether it was proper for the Court to overrule Triplett when both party litigants were unwilling to urge its being overruled. Under intense questioning by the Court in oral argument, however, counsel for the accused infringer (who initially sought to argue that the patented antenna structure should have been held obvious over the prior art) receded to the position that in the particular circumstances of the case (the trial court had forced Blonder-Tongue to go to trial without its witnesses) the evidence from the Winegard case in Iowa should have been considered. No party argued for so-called in rem invalidity, and neither did the United States as amicus curiae. In the last few minutes of Blonder-Tongue counsel's rebuttal argument, Justice White asked him: "Petitioner decided finally to forego any request for reconsidering Triplett entirely or in any part? I had understood you previously say you would welcome a modification of it to some extent?" Counsel replied that, in a case in which a party had not been given the opportunity to present its witnesses, "it ought to be considered whether there ought to be an estoppel in a situation such this." In view of Blonder-Tongue's "change of attitude," the Court said, "we consider that the question of modifying Triplett is properly before us."

The Court then turned to whether Triplett should be overruled. It pointed out that requirement of mutuality of estoppel was a judge-made doctrine. Triplett was decided in 1936, but even then "the mutuality rule had been under fire." The Court quoted Judge Henry Friendly's observation that Jeremy Bentham "had attacked the doctrine 'as destitute of any semblance of reason, and as a maxim which one would suppose to have found its way from the gaming-table to the bench." Moreover, there had been considerable "ferment in scholarly quarters."

The Court approvingly cited the unanimous decision of the California Supreme Court in Bernhard v. Bank of America Nat. Trust & Savings Assn., which had "listed criteria since employed by many courts in many contexts." These were: "Was the issue decided in the prior adjudication identical with the one presented in the action in question? Was there a final judgment on the merits? Was the party against whom the plea is asserted a party or in privity with a party to the prior adjudication?"

The Court approved the decision in Bernhardt for having chosen "to extirpate the mutuality requirement and put it to the torch." Instead, it considered it appropriate that "a party who has had one fair and full opportunity to prove a claim and has failed in that effort, should not be permitted to go to trial on the merits of that claim a second time. Both orderliness and reasonable time saving in judicial administration require that this be so unless some overriding consideration of fairness to a litigant dictates a different result in the circumstances of a particular case."

The Court saw a misallocation of resources in allowing "relitigation of issues where that can be achieved without compromising fairness in particular cases." It is no "longer tenable to afford a litigant more than one full and fair opportunity for judicial resolution of the same issue."

The Court then turned from general considerations of the soundness of requiring mutuality of estoppel to the specific context of patent validity determinations. The Court rejected the patentee's argument that "the unrestricted right to relitigate patent validity is ... an essential safeguard against improvident judgments of invalidity" by courts ill-equipped to deal with complex technological issues. Rather, it would be sufficient just to require that the patentee have "a fair opportunity procedurally, substantively and evidentially to pursue his claim the first time." To determine that it would be sufficient to rely "on the trial courts' sense of justice and equity."

Further, the costliness of patent litigation is an important consideration. Moreover, patent suits consume above average, indeed "inordinate" amount of judicial resources. The expense to the litigants and courts could better be put to more productive uses. Also, "[t]he tendency of Triplett [is] to multiply the opportunities for holders of invalid patents to exact licensing agreements or other settlements from alleged infringers," which can lead to harmful public consequences, including that "consumers will pay higher prices for goods covered by the invalid patent than would be true had the initial ruling of invalidity had at least the potential for broader effect."

Based on these considerations the Court concluded:

When these judicial developments are considered in the light of our consistent view—last presented in Lear, Inc. v. Adkins—that the holder of a patent should not be insulated from the assertion of defenses and thus allowed to exact royalties for the use of an idea that is not in fact patentable or that is beyond the scope of the patent monopoly granted, it is apparent that the uncritical acceptance of the principle of mutuality of estoppel expressed in Triplett v. Lowell is today out of place. Thus, we conclude that Triplett should be overruled to the extent it forecloses a plea of estoppel by one facing a charge of infringement of a patent that has once been declared invalid.
