= Milan Vuitch =

- Born: January 15, 1915
- Died: April 6, 1993 (aged 78)
- Education: Eötvös Loránd University
- Occupation: Physician
- Medical career
- Profession: Doctor

Milan Vuitch (January 15, 1915 - April 6, 1993) was a physician performing abortions in Washington, D.C., and Silver Spring, Maryland. Born in Serbia, he was a naturalized U.S. citizen.

== Early life ==
Vuitch was born in Serbia to a peasant family. His father died when he was young, and his mother made a living growing potatoes and beans. Vuitch won a full scholarship to the University of Budapest, and received his medical degree in 1939. He served as a conscript in the Hungarian army during World War II.

After the war, he practiced surgery and gynecology in Skopje, where he was also an instructor at the medical school. He married American Florence Robinson and with her help was able to immigrate to the United States in 1955. He settled in the Washington, D.C., area, initially charging $100 to $200 for an illegal abortion.

== Court victory ==
In 1969, Judge Gerhard A. Gesell ruled that District of Columbia law was unconstitutionally vague because it permitted abortions only to preserve a mother's "life or health," without clearly defining those terms. Gesell wrote that the word "health" provided "no clear standard to guide either the doctor, the jury or the court." Gesell dismissed an indictment against Vuitch.

The U.S. Supreme Court disagreed with the ruling and held that the standard was clear. However, Justice Hugo Black, in the majority opinion, included language that limited enforcement of the D.C. law as well as similar laws: "Health includes psychological as well as physical well-being." Black's ruling also changed how the law was to be enforced by shifting the burden of proof. Rather than being incumbent upon the physician to prove that the abortion had been medically necessary, Black put the burden on the prosecution to prove that the abortion had not been necessary. If the prosecution did not sufficiently prove that the woman's "life or health" was not in danger, a trial judge would be required to set aside a guilty verdict.

Vuitch was pleased with the outcome of the case and said, "This is a big step forward. Now the government lawyer will be in the position of challenging my medical decision. What are the jury members going to decide when a lawyer tries to tell them that the doctor is wrong about a medical matter?"

Vuitch performed roughly 1,000 abortions annually in his illegal practice three blocks from the White House. However, Vuitch said that his abortions were done purely for medical reasons.

== After Roe ==
After Roe v. Wade, Vuitch ran into trouble in his abortion practice, leading to numerous malpractice suits and public disgrace.

In 1984, WDVM-TV, Washington, D.C., won the Peabody Award for its investigation of Vuitch. The investigation found that Vuitch's practice had been cited for a multitude of violations, such as in 1980 for dirty instruments and lab specimens being refrigerated with food; in 1981 for taking patients to Vuitch's home overnight and having expired drugs; in 1982 for unlicensed drug distribution and mixing dirty and clean surgical instruments and for a patient sent home though she was passing red urine and had a catheter still inside her body; in 1983 for having anesthetic drugs "not freshly prepared and yellowish in color". The investigator also noted that despite these violations, the city kept renewing the clinic's license until 1982, after which Vuitch just operated without one.

The story, by Mark Feldstein, noted a patient who said that Vuitch had operated on her without anesthesia. Feldstein also reported on a 17-year-old patient who had been sent home with instructions to return with $400 before Vuitch would complete her abortion. Though Vuitch had told her not to go to a hospital, she was taken to an emergency room after she collapsed. She gave birth to a live premature baby, of six months gestation, who subsequently died.

Feldstein also provided a female co-worker with a vial of his own urine. She took the specimen to Vuitch's clinic, where staff told her she was pregnant and offered an abortion.

Vuitch did little to help his public image when he said on-camera, "This is not the only lacerated uterus in 15 years. I lacerated uteruses and other surgeons lacerated. And perforated. And this and that."

One lawsuit came from the family of a 32-year-old abortion patient who died in his unlicensed clinic.

Vuitch died at age 78 at Holy Cross Hospital in Silver Spring, MD after suffering a stroke.
