= March for Life =

March for Life may refer to:

- March for Life (Washington, D.C.), an annual anti-abortion gathering held in Washington, D.C.
- March for Life (Paris), an annual demonstration held in Paris protesting abortion
- March for Life (Prague), an annual anti-abortion demonstration held in Prague
- March for Life and Family, an annual march against abortion held in Poland

== See also ==
- March for Our Lives (demonstration), a student-led demonstration in support of tighter gun control held in Washington, D.C.
- March of the Living, an educational trip to Nazi concentration camps in Poland
- Walk for Life West Coast
