= ProLife Europe =

European anti-abortion non-profit organization

- Founded: 2019
- Founded at: Augsburg, Germany
- Headquarters: Memminger Str. 30, D–89264 Weißenhorn.
- Region served: Germany, Austria, Switzerland, The Netherlands, Portugal, Poland, Lithuania
- Official language: German, Dutch, English, Portuguese, Polish, Lithuanian
- President: Maria Czernin
- Website: https://prolifeeurope.org/

ProLife Europe is a secular European-based NGO opposed to abortion. Its primary mission is to train and mobilize university students and young adults across Europe to advocate against abortion, grounded in a compassionate and empathic approach.

== History ==
ProLife Europe was officially founded on March 24, 2019, in Augsburg, Germany. Recognizing that abortion remained largely treated as a taboo subject despite its widespread impact on women, the founders sought to establish a European network of young people to break the silence around abortion.

They centered their outreach on university campuses, engaging young adults during a pivotal stage when they are evaluating key questions of life, relationships, responsibility, and human dignity.

The group sought to empower people the confidence to speak candidly in defense of unborn rights, listen intently, and have sincere, respectful discussions with those who hold different opinions.

Since its inception, the organization has expanded into a multinational network spanning active local chapters and university groups in Germany, Austria, the Netherlands, Portugal, Poland, Lithuania, and Switzerland, with 54 established groups. Groups members often attend and speak at pro-life marches in Europe.

In 2025, it received an award from the Catholic Archdiocese of Seoul for its pro-life work.

== Philosphical Approach ==
Natural law, international human rights principles, and biological consensus on human development are the basis of ProLife Europe's arguments against abortion.

The organization adheres to a "shared humanity" philosophy, operating on the premise that a fundamental human dignity exists independent of political, religious, or individual worldviews. It aims to interact with the public, including pro-choice advocates, by using this shared baseline as a forum for discussion.

Through the use of young adults and university students, ProLife Europe seeks to foster cultural interactions through nonjudgmental and empathy driven-discussions rather than partisan political confrontations. A key focus of the organization's position is being non-judgmental towards women, especially to those who have had abortions. For this reason genuine respect and active listening is stressed upon.

To promote its position on human dignity and unborn rights, ProLife Europe engages in peer-to-peer conversations, information stands, internet initiatives, and participation in European March for Life events.

== Major Activities ==
=== Opposition to the Austrian Student's Union Abortion Fund ===
ProLife Europe initiated a petition drive in reaction to the Austrian Repo fund, a financial subsidy program for abortions established by the Austrian National Union of Students' executive board.

The petition "No Abortion Funding with ÖH Contributions!" received over 12,000 signatures from students and residents. The initiative argued that mandatory student membership fees (ÖH-Pflichtbeiträge) should not be allocated to third-party organizations to fund elective medical procedures outside core university representation, citing concerns over students' freedom of conscience and moral or ethical objections to abortion.

=== Reinstating the March for Life in Lithuania ===
In the 2025, the Lithuanian branch of ProLife Europe, acting as a founding organizer, started a coalition of family advocate organizations, crisis pregnancy centers, and regional pro-life groups to revive the national March for Life in Lithuania (Žygis už gyvybę). Prior to this initiative, the last large-scale national March for Life in the country had been conducted in 1993.

The organized coalition successfully re-established the annual march in Vilnius, holding events in 2026 and 2027. According to event organizers, the revived demonstrations attracted approximately 2,000 participants during its initial 2026 procession and expanded to roughly 3,000 attendees for the 2027 event.

Both events were attended by pro-life figures from neighbouring Latvia, Estonia and Poland.
