= March for Life (Prague) =

Czech anti-abortion demonstration

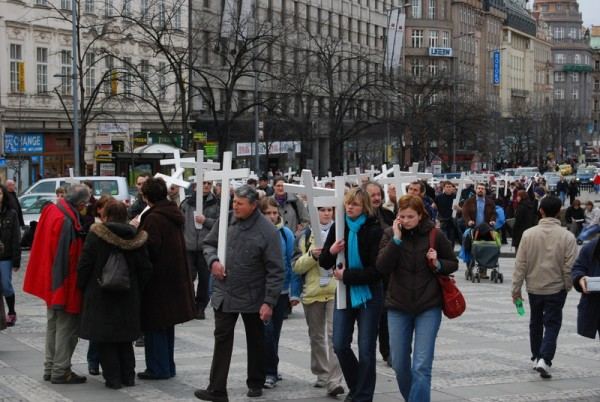
2009 Pro-life March on Wenceslas Square, 28 March 2009

The March for Life (Czech: Pochod pro život) is an annual anti-abortion demonstration held in Prague in late March, close to the International Day of the Unborn Child (25 March). The first march was held in 2001. It is organized by Hnutí pro život (Pro-life Movement) of the Czech Republic. The participants usually carry white crosses symbolizing the victims of abortion. The event is supported by the Latin and Eastern Catholic churches. The march is usually opened by a Mass celebrated by archbishop of Prague. Politicians such as Pavel Bělobrádek (KDU-ČSL), Jitka Chalánková (TOP 09), Eva Richtrová (ČSSD) and Jaroslav Plachý (ODS) have attended the march in the past. The march leads to the Wenceslas Square and ends at the Saint Wenceslas statue.

== See also ==
- Abortion in the Czech Republic
- March for Life and Family
- March for Life (Washington, D.C.)
- Walk for Life West Coast
