= March for Life (Paris) =

Annual anti-abortion event held in Paris, France

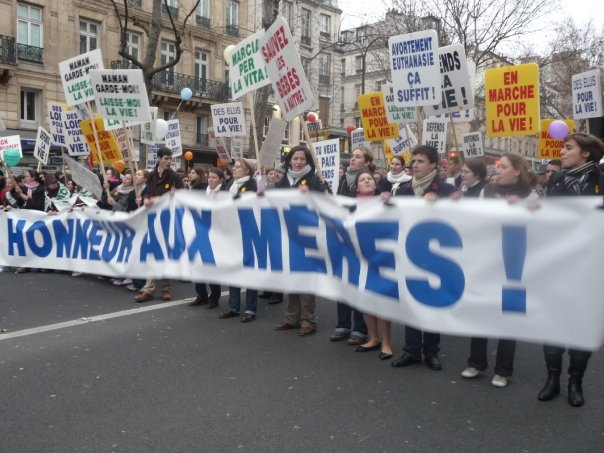
View of the 2009 Pro-life March. January 25, 2009.

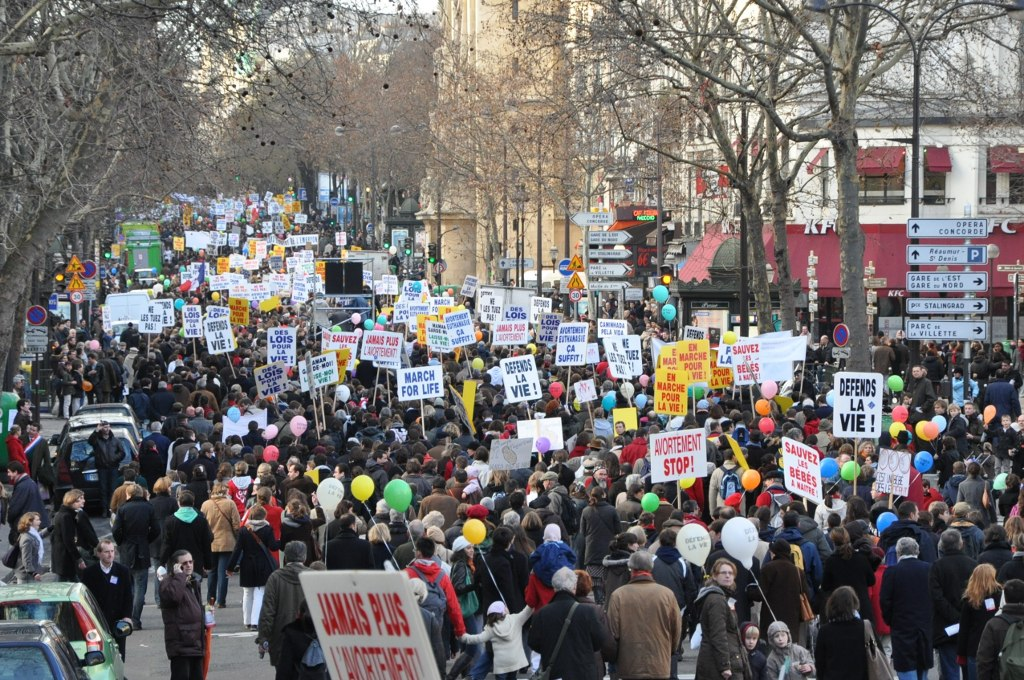
March for Life, Paris. January 17, 2010.

The Paris March for Life (French: Marche pour la vie) is an annual demonstration protesting abortion held in Paris in late January, close to the anniversary date of the 1975 law that legalized abortion in France. The event was created in 2005 by several French anti-abortion organizations the thirtieth year of legal abortion which it is opposed to. It defines itself as non-denominational and non-partisan.

Over the years, the Paris March for Life has become the largest annual anti-abortion gathering in Europe. Estimates of the number of marchers in 2008 range from 2,500 to 20,000. The rally attracts delegations from European countries other than France, notably Italy, Spain, Belgium, the UK, Poland, Switzerland, Germany and Ireland.

2010 saw a sharp rise in attendance, possibly as high as 25,000, compared to 15,000 in 2009. These numbers have since increased to 50,000 in 2017.

== See also ==
- March for Life and Family (Warsaw, Poland)
- March for Life (Washington, D.C., U.S.A.)
- March for Life (Prague)
- Walk for Life West Coast (San Francisco, Calif., U.S.A.)
