= Unbridled (2017 film) =

2017 film by John David Ware

- Directed by: John David Ware
- Written by: Bonne Bartron; Christy McGlothlin
- Produced by: Christy McGlothlin; Gerald McGlothlin
- Starring: Eric Roberts; T.C. Stallings; Téa Mckay; Jenn Gotzon; Dey Young; Rachel Hendrix; David Topp
- Cinematography: Blackett Bell
- Music by: Score: David C. Williams; Song: Jibin George Sebastian
- Release dates: August 4, 2017 (Great Lakes Christian Film Festival); January 18, 2019
- Country: United States
- Language: English

Unbridled is a 2017 film, released theatrically in 2019 and directed by John David Ware. The film stars Eric Roberts, T.C. Stallings, Téa Mckay, Jenn Gotzon, Dey Young, Rachel Hendrix and David Topp. The music score of the film is done by David C Williams and an original song in the film is composed by Jibin George Sebastian.
