= Burrn! =

Japanese heavy metal magazine

- Editor-in-Chief: Kō Sakai (1984–1993); Kazuo Hirose (1994–present)
- Categories: Heavy metal music
- Frequency: Monthly
- Publisher: Shinko Music (1984–1990); Burrn! Corporation (1991–2013); Shinko Music Entertainment (2013–present)
- First issue: 5 September 1984; 42 years ago
- Country: Japan
- Based in: Tokyo
- Language: Japanese
- Website: burrn.online

Burrn! (Japanese: バーン, Hepburn: Bān; stylized as BURRN!) is a monthly Japanese magazine for fans of heavy metal music, published since September 1984. It is the major publication on heavy metal music in the country. As of 2013, it is published by Shinko Music Entertainment in Tokyo. The magazine's content is in Japanese and largely focuses on Western artists, while the covers are predominantly in English.

== History ==
Despite being a Japanese magazine, a Japanese musician was not featured on the cover of Burrn! until the January 2016 issue featured Akira Takasaki on its cover. This does not include the separate Burrn! Japan magazine, which was published for six volumes between 1987 and 1990 to focus on Japanese artists, before being revived in 2016. This has been said to have been the policy of Burrn!'s editor-in-chief from 1984 to 1993, Kō Sakai.

Burrn! has held a readers poll annually since its founding in 1984. In 2019, Mari Hamada become the first Japanese musician to top the vocalist category in the poll's 36 year history.

Mark Joseph documented the magazine's commercial influence through the example of American Christian metal band Stryper: critic Masa Itoh's positive review of their 1984 debut EP The Yellow and Black Attack, combined with airplay on his radio show, resulted in the band outselling Mötley Crüe, Bon Jovi, and other mainstream metal acts on Japanese charts, an outcome Joseph attributed directly to Itoh's standing as "the man who ruled the Japanese hard rock/metal scene."

Metallion is a special issue of Burrn! first published in 1986 before being suspended in 1991. It is now published irregularly since 1999.

In a now-infamous November 1985 review, Sakai gave Seikima-II's debut album, Seikima-II ~ Akuma ga Kitarite Heavy Metal, a rating of 0. For the next 35 years, the band did not have any contact with Burrn!. At the end of 2020, current editor-in-chief Kazuo Hirose went to a Seikima-II event and offered to interview them for the magazine. They were subsequently featured on the cover of and interviewed for the March 2021 issue.
