= Jenn Gotzon =

American film actress (born 1979)

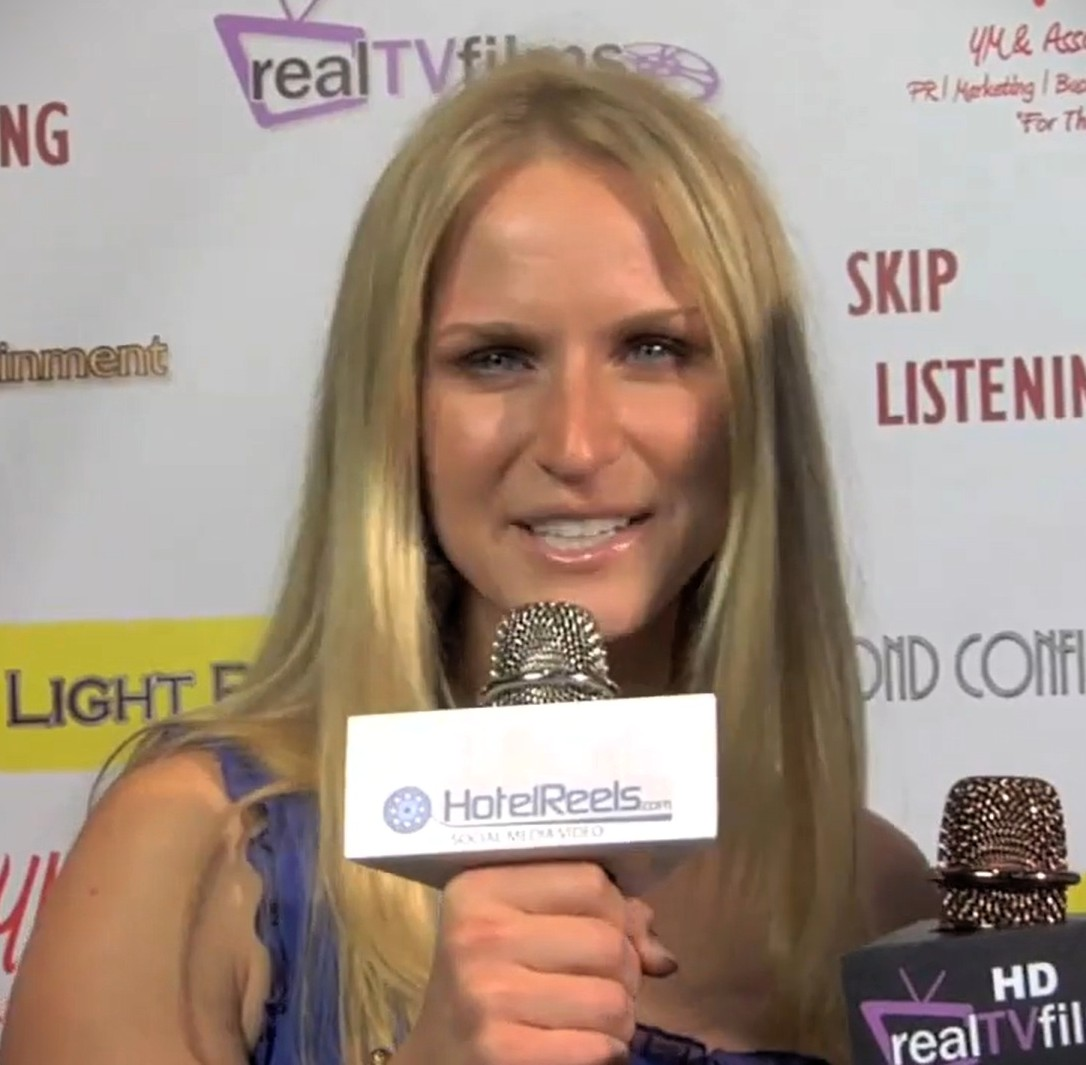
Gotzon in 2010

Jenn Gotzon Chandler is an American film actress. She portrayed U.S. President Richard Nixon's daughter Tricia Nixon in the 2009 film Frost/Nixon. Gotzon portrayed the female protagonist in The Farmer and The Belle: Saving Santaland opposite her actor-husband Jim E. Chandler, and appeared in the mystery-drama Doonby.

== Early life and education ==
Jennifer Lee Gotzon was born in Bethlehem, Pennsylvania, and raised in neighboring Northampton. She attended Northampton Area High School and graduated in 1997. She competed in the Miss America pageant.

Gotzon studied at the New York Conservatory for Dramatic Arts for two years and did a two-year conservatory at Joanne Baron/DW Baron Studio in Los Angeles. Gotzon also worked for Google in various positions, including human resources co-ordinator.

== Career ==
Gotzon's first lead role was in 2002 in low-budget independent film Julie and Jack, for which she won Best Actress at the Global Arts Film in Sacramento.

Gotzon had a number of "bit roles" in TV series, including House, Pushing Daisies, and CSI: New York. In 2009, she had a cameo role in Frost/Nixon as First Daughter Tricia Nixon Cox, after casting director Jane Jenkins was struck by her physical resemblance to Nixon's daughter.

In 2008, Gotzon won Best Actress for the short film Stained at the 168 Film Festival, a contest that gives filmmakers 168 hours to shoot, edit, and score a film based on a Bible verse. Gotzon received the 2008 Rising Star Award at the Wildwood By the Sea Film Festival.

In 2012, Gotzon had a leading role in psychological thriller Doonby. She was cast by producer Mark Joseph after he followed her on social media, making it the "first official Facebook casting of a lead role in a theatrically released film." Writer-director Peter Mackenzie had a scene digitally altered to make it more "Christian-friendly", reducing the amount of cleavage shown by Gotzon in response to comments from religious leaders.

The Film Advisory Board granted Gotzon an "Award of Excellence for 'Doonby' and Outstanding Contribution to the Entertainment World [Inspiring Audiences motivational program]". Gotzon also starred in the Christian film God's Country, directed by her then-husband Armstrong, in 2012, for which she received "Best Actor" at the Pocono Mountain Film Festival.

Since 2017, Gotzon has worked on faith-based film projects with her husband Jim Chandler, including My Daddy's in Heaven, Sunrise in Heaven, and the 2020 releaseThe Farmer and the Belle: Saving Santaland, a Christmas movie loosely based on their real=life romance.

== Personal life ==
Gotzon was previously married to director Chris Armstrong, who she met in 2004 after he cast her in his senior thesis film. They divorced in 2014. She married Jim Chandler, whom she met while working on a movie together in 2014, on March 17, 2017; footage from their wedding was used in The Farmer and The Belle.

Gotzon has a mentor-outreach program called Inspiring Audiences in which she speaks at high schools about the moral lessons of her movies.
