= Ola Ray =

American actress

- Born: August 26, 1960 (age 66); St. Louis, Missouri, U.S.
- Occupations: Actress; model
- Years active: 1980–present
- Height: 5 ft 5 in (1.65 m)

Ola Ray (born August 26, 1960) is an American actress and model, best known for her role as the girlfriend of Michael Jackson in the music video for "Thriller".

== Career ==
Ray modeled for Playboy and was the Playmate of the Month for the June 1980 issue. In 1983, she starred as the girlfriend of Michael Jackson in the music video Thriller. Ray complained in the past about difficulties collecting royalties from her participation in Thriller. At first, Ray blamed Jackson. She ultimately sued Jackson in May 2009 in a dispute to obtain uncollected royalties. Jackson died less than two months later on June 25 at age 50. In 2012, Jackson's attorney John Branca and accountant John McClain settled the lawsuit with Ray. She was portrayed by Asia Fuqua in the 2026 Michael Jackson biopic Michael.

== Filmography ==
=== Film ===
Year	Title	Role	Notes
1981	Body and Soul	Hooker #1	
1982	Night Shift	Dawn	
1982	48 Hrs.	Vroman’s Dancer	
1983	10 to Midnight	Ola	
1983	The Man Who Loved Women	Girl #2	
1985	Fear City	Honey	
1987	The Night Stalker	Sable Fox	
1987	Beverly Hills Cop II	Playboy Playmate	
2019	It Wants Blood!	Madame Du Sang	
2020	Shooting Heroin	Helen	

=== Television ===
Year	Title	Role	Notes
1984	Automan	Joanne	Episode: "Murder MTV"
1984	Gimme a Break!	Deanna	Episode: "The Center"
1985	Cheers	Andrea	Episode: "King of the Hill"
1985	What's Happening Now!!	Paulette	Episode: "Married or Not"
2000	Where Are They Now?	Herself	Episode: "Video Vixens II"
2001	I Love 1980's	Herself	Episode: "New Years Compilation"
2002	Never Mind the Buzzcocks	Herself	Episode: "Episode #1.2"

=== Music videos ===
Year	Title	Role	Artist
1980	"Give Me the Night"	—N/a	George Benson
1983	Thriller	Michael's girlfriend	Michael Jackson
2009	"Paparazzi"	Policewoman	Lady Gaga

== See also ==
- List of people in Playboy 1980–1989

Gig Gangel	Sandy Cagle	Henriette Allais	Liz Glazowski	Martha Thomsen	Ola Ray
Teri Peterson	Victoria Cooke	Lisa Welch	Mardi Jacquet	Jeana Keough	Terri Welles
