= God's Country (2011 film) =

- Directed by: Chris Amstrong
- Produced by: John Atterberry; Cecil Chambers
- Starring: Jenn Gotzon; Daniel Hugh Kelly
- Distributed by: Image Entertainment
- Release date: October 15, 2011 (Gig Harbor Film Festival)
- Country: United States
- Language: English

God's Country is a 2011 comedy-drama family film directed by Chris Armstrong which takes place in Los Angeles and the Mojave Desert starring Jenn Gotzon, Daniel Hugh Kelly, Gib Gerard, Michael Toland, Todd Duffey, Suzanne Ford, Arlene Santana, Kelvin Brown, Stephanie Barnes and Gonzalo Menendez.

== Plot ==
Meghan Doherty (played by Jenn Gotzon) is a young, talented executive who neglects her mother and close friends to focus on one goal making money. After closing a multimillion-dollar deal Meghan is asked by Mr. Randolph Whitaker (Daniel Hugh Kelly) (her boss/CEO) to close a deal of a lifetime. She's taking her talent to the Mojave Desert in hopes of getting a Christian land owner (Michael Toland) to turn over his land before auction. With a 100 million dollar potential deal looming, there is nothing that will stand in the way of her getting what she needs to further her career. Not even God or a boy (Gib Gerard)? Over a period of 6 days Meghan goes through spiritual transformation (fish out of water) calling on her favorite investor to help save the Land.

== Release and reception ==
God's Country premiered at the 2011 Gig Harbor Film Festival. It then had a limited release in theaters 2012, premiered on Uplifting Television Aug 2013 and is selling in stores in United States and airing on Netflix. Distributed by Image Entertainment's faithbased division Slingshot. Produced by late John Atterberry and Cecil Chambers.

God's Country won Director's Choice Award at Gig Harbor Film Festival (2011) and Best Actress Award for Jenn Gotzon at Pocono Mountain Film Festival (2013).
