= Can We Take a Joke? =

- Directed by: Ted Balaker
- Written by: Ted Balaker; Zach Weissmueller
- Story by: Ted Balaker
- Produced by: Ted Balaker; Courtney Moorehead Balaker
- Starring: Lisa Lampanelli; Heather McDonald; Jim Norton; Gilbert Gottfried; Adam Carolla; Penn Jillette; Karith Foster
- Narrated by: Christina Pazsitzky
- Production company: Korchula Productions
- Distributed by: Samuel Goldwyn Films
- Release dates: November 13, 2015 (DOC NYC); July 29, 2016
- Running time: 75 Minutes
- Country: United States
- Language: English

Can We Take a Joke? is a 2015 documentary film by filmmaker Ted Balaker and narrated by Christina Pazsitzky. The film explores a comedian-piloted dialogue about modern uses of freedom of speech in the United States.

== Summary ==
The creators describe the documentary as a "thought-provoking and wry exportation of outrage culture through the lens of stand-up comedy." Exploring how "outrage has become commonplace" and figures such as Gilbert Gottfried, Jim Norton and Adam Carolla detailing its impact on free speech and the exchange of ideas.

== Reception ==
=== Critical reception ===
The film received a 55% fresh on Rotten Tomatoes, with an average rating of 5.8/10 with 20 reviews counted.

Some critics criticized it for being one sided and for taking a hard line on free speech, while others regarded it as sobering and comical.

=== Film festivals ===
The film was premiered November 13, 2015 at the IFC Center in New York City as part of the DOC NYC film festival. Those in attendance included featured subjects Gilbert Gottfried, Karith Foster, and Greg Lukianoff as well as director Ted Balaker, producer Courtney Moorehead Balaker, co-producer Zach Weissmueller and executive producers Phil Harvey and A.C. Bushnell.

In addition, Can We Take a Joke? was screened at Sun Valley Film Festival, Sarasota Film Festival, Anthem Film Festival, RiverRun Film Festival, and Indie Street Film Festival.

Distributed by Samuel Goldwyn Films. Distribution focused on digital, cable and Vimeo On Demand outlets, but included a small theatrical run in Los Angeles, New York City, and Arlington, Virginia. The theatrical release date was July 29, 2016 and the film's digital release (August 3, 2016) was selected to highlight the 50th anniversary of the death of Lenny Bruce, a central figure in the film.

=== Controversial screening at Lawrence University ===
A screening of Can We Take a Joke? was held at Lawrence University, a liberal arts college in Appleton, Wisconsin. Students for Free Thought on campus held a screening of Can We Take a Joke? as a way to start a discussion about free speech on campus. During the screening, many students began yelling, expressing distaste for the film. Co-founder of Students for Free Thought, Chris Wand, was pleased that the film started a conversation on campus.

The Lawrence student government voted against recognizing Students for Free Thought as an official university club.

Director and producer Ted Balaker later wrote an article about the Lawrence University screening.

== Streaming and home media ==
The film was distributed by Samuel Goldwyn Films. It was made available on cable and satellite providers such as Verizon, Comcast, and DirecTV, as well as various streaming platforms.
