= Nellie Gray (activist) =

American lawyer and activist (1924–2012)

Nellie Jane Gray
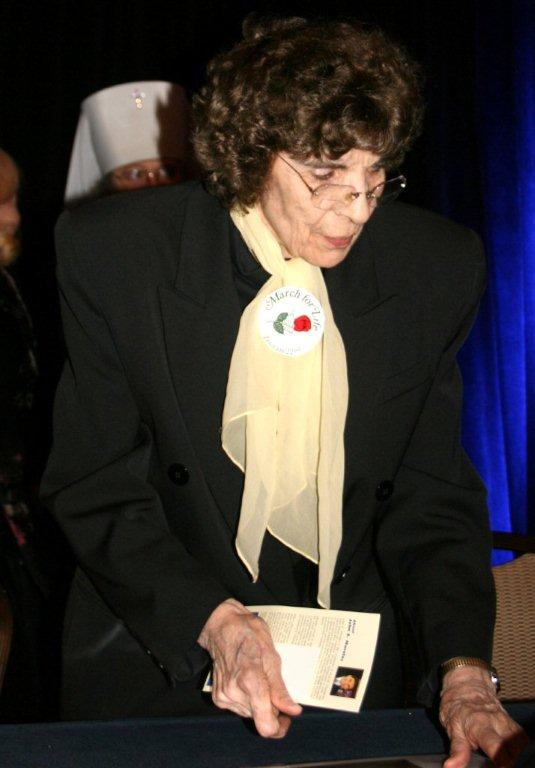
- Born: June 25, 1924; Big Spring, Texas
- Died: August 13, 2012 (aged 87–88); Washington, D.C.
- Occupations: Lawyer, Activist
- Known for: March for Life

Nellie Jane Gray (June 25, 1924 – August 13, 2012) was an American anti-abortion activist who founded the annual March for Life in 1974, in response to the Supreme Court ruling Roe v. Wade, which decriminalized abortion the previous year. The New York Times credits her with popularizing the term pro-life.

== Biography ==
Born in Big Spring, Texas, Gray, a Roman Catholic convert, enlisted in the military on June 27, 1944, at Camp Bennett, Texas, and served as a corporal in the Women's Army Corps (WAC) during World War II.

She later earned a bachelor's degree in business and a master's in economics from Georgetown University Law School. She was an employee of the federal government for 28 years, working in the Departments of State and Labor, while attending Georgetown University Law School. She found herself practicing law before the U.S. Supreme Court.

After Roe v. Wade, she retired from professional life and became an anti-abortion activist, beginning with the March for Life. She was an opposition speaker at the 1977 National Women's Conference with Lottie Beth Hobbs, Dr. Mildred Fay Jefferson, Phyllis Schlafly and R.K. Dornan.

Gray died in August 2012 at age 88.
