= Karith Foster =

American comedian (born 1974)

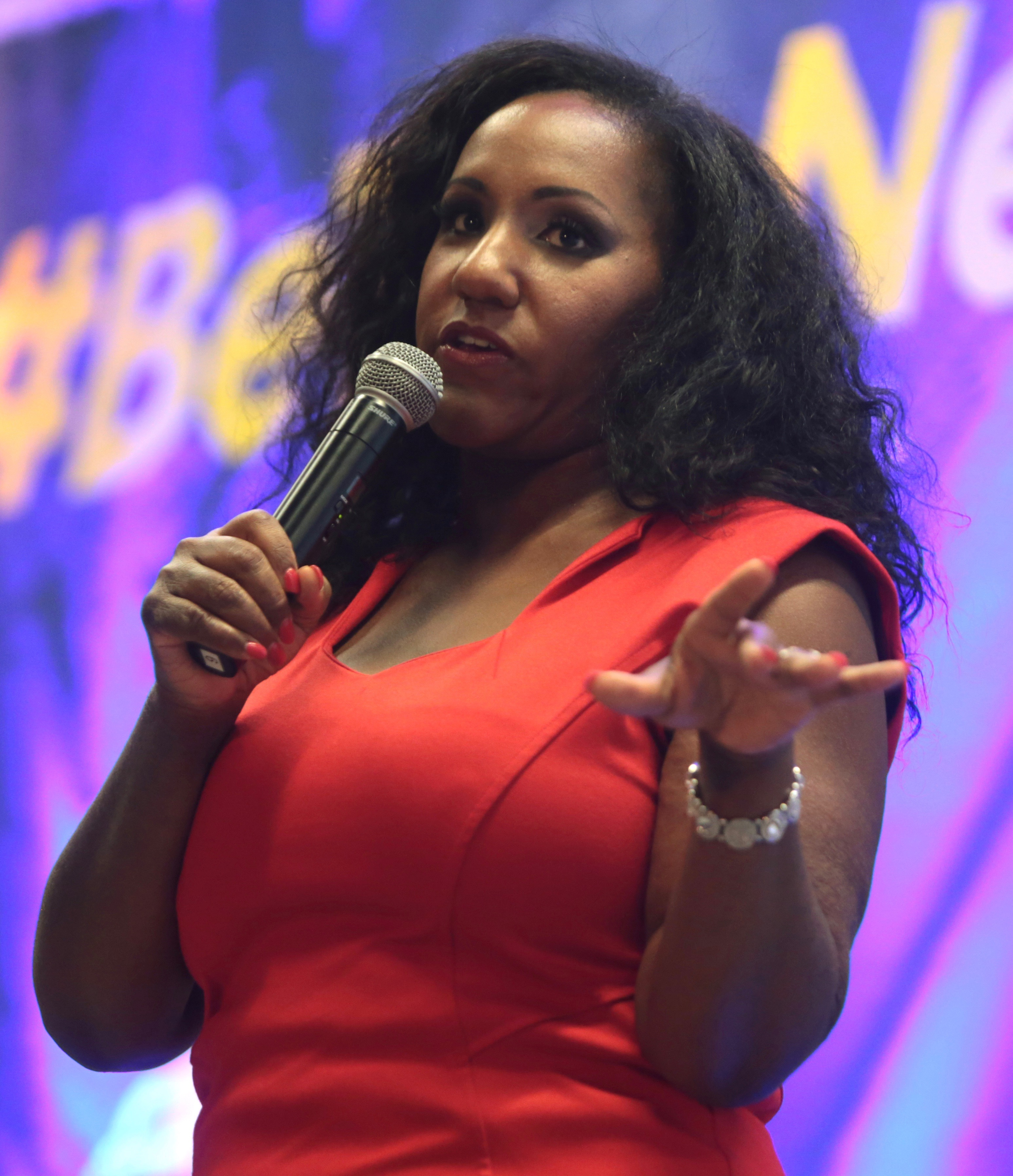
- Foster in 2016
- Born: June 30, 1974 (age 51); Denver, Colorado, U.S.
- Education: Stephens College (BA); St Peter's College, Oxford
- Occupations: Comedian; public speaker; television and radio personality; actress; author; entrepreneur
- Years active: 1998–present

Karith Foster (born June 30, 1974) is an American comedian, speaker, television and radio personality, actress, author, and entrepreneur. In 2016, Foster founded the Foster Russell Family Foundation, a 501(c)(3) non-profit organization which is committed to "Inspiring free speech, social change and empowerment through education and mentorship."

== Early life ==
Foster was born in Denver, Colorado and raised in Plano, Texas. Her mother, Carol Daugherty Foster, was the Editor-In-Chief of the national publication Minority Business News for nearly two decades and is also co-founder of the Minority Business Hall of Fame at the University of Washington's Foster School of Business (named for the unrelated businessman Michael G. Foster). Growing up, Foster was often the only African-American student in any of her classes, but she credits her entrée into the entertainment world to her upbringing in the affluent suburb of Plano, Texas, where she ironically starred in her high school's production of A Raisin in the Sun.

Foster graduated from Stephens College, an historical women's college in Columbia, Missouri, with a bachelor's degree in Broadcast Journalism. She also attended St. Peter's College at Oxford University in England. Foster moved to New York City, where she worked in production for the ABC talk show The View. During this time, she also worked for Estée Lauder Companies, Inc., where she headed and ran its national Tuition Reimbursement Program, and pursued a career in stand-up comedy.

== Stand-up comedy ==
Since entering the comedy scene in New York City in 1998, Foster has performed both live audience warm-up and as a guest for The Oprah Winfrey Show and for Showtime at the Apollo Theatre. When she is not headlining colleges and clubs across the country, Foster performs weekly at a variety of NYC comedy clubs including the Comedy Cellar, The Comic Strip Live, Carolines on Broadway, Gotham Comedy Club, Stand-up New York Comedy Club, Broadway Comedy Club & Café, and New York Comedy Club. She has also performed at The Ice House in Pasadena, and The Improv, the Laugh Factory, The Comedy Store and the Story Salon in Los Angeles. “Karith Foster: Straight Outta Plano" is currently in rotation on Sirius/XM’s Raw Dog Comedy Channel.

== Television and film ==
Foster has appeared on a number of television programs, including Comedy Central's Premium Blend, NBC's Today and Last Comic Standing, and VH1's Best Week Ever, Awesomely Bad, and Black to the Future miniseries. She has also been seen on various programs from BET, Bravo, the Travel Channel, and the Fine Living Network.

In 2015, Foster was featured in the documentary Can We Take a Joke?, which is "an examination of Western society's apparent contemporary intolerance of edgy humor by comedians". The documentary also features other prominent comedians such as Adam Carolla, Penn Jillette, Gilbert Gottfried, and Lisa Lampanelli.

Foster is also featured in the 2019 docudrama No Safe Spaces. The film covers how college campuses, originally seen as havens for free expression, have come to threaten that very concept. Directed by Justin Folk, the film features such personalities as Tim Allen, Dennis Prager, Adam Carolla, Andrew Schulz, Ben Shapiro, Bryan Callen, and more.

== Radio ==
Foster is the host of the TalkBackTV show Shovio.com. She was previously a contributor on the Imus in the Morning on WABC radio and its RFD-TV television program. Foster was terminated from the show in August 2009.

She is also a recurring guest on John Fugelsang's Tell Me Everything radio show on SiriusXM Insight, and co-host of Shapiro and Foster on Fox Business Network podcasts. Foster was also an occasional co-host of “The Black Phillip Show” with Patrice O’Neal on XM Radio.

== Speaking career ==
In addition to being a comic, Foster is recognized for being a prolific speaker. By applying her brand of comedy to her speaking career, Foster has become a sought-after speakers for both college campuses and corporations in the areas of diversity, leadership, women, team building, and motivational speaking. Her keynotes and presentations include events at Stephens College, the Woodhull Institute, and Tony Robbins' NY Powerteam, and Own it Venture's Women's Business Expo. In March 2017, Foster delivered her first TEDx Talk, “The Art of Defying Stereotypes: Learning to be True to Your Voice,” at the TEDx LincolnSquare Risk Takers and Change Makers event in New York City

Foster has also developed specific programs for Diversity Engagement. She is the founder of a number of workshops which she leads for groups, social organizations, and corporations, including: "Laughter Bootcamp," “Stereotyped 101™," “You Are E.N.O.U.G.H.™," “The Humor Initiative™," and "You Can Be Perfect...OR You Can Be Happy™." Since its creation in 2016, the Foster Russell Family Foundation has partnered with over two dozen corporations, and delivered programming to over thirty universities.

She is the author of "Laugh Your Way to Happiness: 101 Ways to Have a Great Laugh" and the soon to be released children's book "Lealah Finds Love."
