= Shooting Heroin =

- Directed by: Spencer Folmar
- Written by: Spencer Folmar
- Produced by: Spencer Folmar; Mark Joseph
- Starring: Alan Powell; Sherilyn Fenn; Cathy Moriarty; Nicholas Turturro; Garry Pastore; Lawrence Hilton Jacobs; Rachel Hendrix; Brian O'Halloran
- Cinematography: John Honore
- Edited by: Spencer Folmar
- Music by: Mike Newport
- Production company: SpenceTF Productions
- Distributed by: Hard Faith
- Release date: October 2019 (Rowland Theater)
- Running time: 90 minutes
- Country: United States
- Language: English

Shooting Heroin is a 2019 American action thriller drama film written and directed by Spencer T. Folmar and starring Alan Powell, Sherilyn Fenn, Cathy Moriarty, Nicholas Turturro, Garry Pastore, Lawrence Hilton Jacobs, Rachel Hendrix, Ola Ray and Brian O'Halloran.

== Cast ==
- Sherilyn Fenn as Hazel
- Alan Powell as Adam
- Garry Pastore as Officer Jerry
- Nicholas Turturro as Reverend John
- Cathy Moriarty as Beth
- Lawrence Hilton Jacobs as Edward
- Daniella Mason as Cheyenne
- Rachel Hendrix as Brittany
- Ola Ray as Helen
- Brian O'Halloran as Logan

== Release ==
The film premiered at the Rowland Theater in October 2019. Then it was released on April 3, 2020.

== Reception ==
The film has a 61% rating on Rotten Tomatoes based on eighteen reviews.

Frank Scheck of The Hollywood Reporter gave the film a negative review and wrote, "America’s opioid crisis would seem too dire a subject to receive shallow cinematic treatment. So it’s ironic, then, that Spencer T. Folmar’s thriller suffers from not quite being exploitative enough."

Owen Gleiberman of Variety gave the film a positive review and wrote, "Shooting Heroin gives the emotions of vengeance a minor workout, only to come out the other side of them. The film argues, in theory, for a richer understanding of the problem."

Alan Ng of Film Threat rated the film a 7 out of 10 and wrote, "Shooting Heroin is a good story and a good movie with the best of intentions."

Carlos Aguilar of the Los Angeles Times gave the film a positive review and wrote, “ However, it never resorts to exploitative images in order to sear its point with gruesomeness, and that’s commendable.”
