= The Perfect Wave =

- Film poster
- Directed by: Bruce Macdonald
- Written by: Roger Hawkins; William A. Wood III; Billy Wood
- Produced by: S. Bryan Hickox; Bruce Macdonald
- Starring: Scott Eastwood
- Cinematography: Trevor Michael Brown
- Edited by: Tim Goodwin
- Music by: Jeremy Soule
- Release date: 3 February 2014 (Australia)
- Running time: 94 minutes
- Countries: South Africa; New Zealand; Indonesia
- Language: English

The Perfect Wave is a 2014 biographical drama film about the life of Ian McCormack, a surfer who became a minister after his near death experience. The film stars Scott Eastwood as McCormack. It is the directorial debut of Bruce Macdonald.

== Plot ==
A young Kiwi surfer named Ian is on his OE (overseas experience) in Mauritius, an island off the coast of Africa. While night diving with friends, he is stung by 5 deadly box jellyfish and takes a dramatic journey to hospital, helped and hindered by local people. He cries out to the God he barely remembers from childhood and meets him face to face, saying "you can't love me, I've cursed you, slept around, taken drugs and more". What happens after that is riveting and provides a beacon of hope, not just for Ian, but for everyone who has ever lived.

== Cast ==
- Scott Eastwood as Ian McCormack
- Cheryl Ladd as Mrs. McCormack
- Patrick Lyster as Mr. McCormack
- Rachel Hendrix as Anabel
- Scott Mortensen as Lachlan
- Nikolai Mynhardt as Michael McCormack
- Diana Vickers as Kim
- Matt Bromley as Mark
- Rosy Hodge as Roxy
- Shaun Payne as Free Surfer
- Jack Halloran as Greg
