= Garry Pastore =

American actor and filmmaker

- Born: December 2, 1961 (age 64); Great Kills, Staten Island, New York, U.S.
- Occupations: Actor, stuntman, writer, filmmaker
- Years active: 1980–present
- Website: garrypastore.com

Garry Pastore (born December 2, 1961) is an American actor, stuntman, writer, and filmmaker.

== Background ==
Pastore was born in Great Kills, Staten Island, New York City, the middle child in a family of six. He resides in Central New Jersey with his wife, Melody, and their four children. He is the brother of musician Eric Blackwood, and the cousin of fellow actor Vincent Pastore.

He has worked as a property person with International Alliance of Theatrical Stage Employees. He is member of the New York Friars Club.

== Actor ==
Pastore has acted in over 70 television and feature films since the early 1980s.

His acting film credits include The Last Call (2021),The Irishman (2019), Shooting Heroin (2019), Mob Town (2019), The Week Of (2018), Sarah Q (2018), Who's Jenna (2018), Do the Right Thing (1989), Goodfellas (1990), A Bronx Tale (1993), Carlito's Way (1993), Donnie Brasco (1997), Cop Land (1997), Witness to the Mob (1998), The Yards (2000), The Wolf of Wall Street (2013), and Rob the Mob (2014).

He also has film credits as a set dresser for the films Spider-Man (2002), Lord of War (2005), World Trade Center (2006), The Good Shepherd (2006), Now You See Me (2013), and Blue Jasmine (2013).

His stunt work film credits include Do the Right Thing, Leon: The Professional (1994), Godzilla (1998), The Dark Knight Rises, the episode "The Milkmaid's Lot" of the HBO series Boardwalk Empire (2012), and The Amazing Spider-Man 2 (2014). In 2012, he was in the ensemble nominated for a SAG Award for The Dark Knight Rises.

Pastore has appeared in numerous television programs including the series Cosby, 30 Rock, Blue Bloods, and Law & Order: Criminal Intent. Pastore played Jerry Basile of the fictional Mafia Lupertazzi crime family in the HBO series The Sopranos in the "Marco Polo" (2004) episode. Pastore is seen in the HBO series The Deuce as real life Genovese Crime Family boss Matthew Ianniello.

He portrayed mobster Albert Anastasia in The Irishman and in Last Call, Mr. Delvecchio.

== Writer and director ==
Pastore wrote the book You're Not in Mom's Kitchen Anymore, published in 1998, containing recipes and tips for college students. The second book 'Destressed' is based on the award-winning movie Destressed (2013) with self-help section by coach Dana Ketels, will be published March 2021, helping people to find sanity in an insane world.

Pastore made his directorial and producing debut at the New York International Independent Film and Video Festival in 2009 with his film Waiting For... Budd, which garnered eight awards including best director, best producer and best film awards. The 30-minute documentary is about a staged reading of On the Waterfront, which was originally written by Budd Schulberg, and who attended the reading the night before his death. The award was presented at the Shrine Auditorium in January 2010. The film also won awards at the Accolade Global Film Competition and the Staten Island Film Festival.

After screenings in the Netherlands and Belgium, Pastore's film Destressed premiered the Garden State Film Festival at the Trump Taj Mahal, Atlantic City on April 5, 2014, where it won the public's choice "Pick of the Flicks" and jury prizes. It won "best documentary" at the Golden Door Film Festival in September 2014.
