= Doonby =

- Film poster
- Directed by: Peter Mackenzie
- Screenplay by: Peter Mackenzie
- Produced by: Peter Mackenzie; Mike Mackenzie; Tommy G. Warren; Dawn Krantz; Mark Joseph
- Starring: John Schneider; Ernie Hudson; Jennifer O'Neill; Will Wallace; Robert Davi; Joe Estevez
- Cinematography: Peter Field
- Edited by: Drake Silliman
- Music by: Claude Foisy
- Production companies: Spiderwood Studios; Riverhorse Entertainment; The Nobody Film Company
- Release date: November 1, 2013
- Running time: 104 minutes
- Country: United States
- Language: English
- Budget: $2 million

Doonby is a 2013 independent film written and directed by Peter Mackenzie. It stars John Schneider, Jenn Gotzon, Ernie Hudson, Jennifer O'Neill, Will Wallace, Robert Davi, and Joe Estevez.

== Plot summary ==
Sam Doonby is a mysterious drifter who gets off a bus one afternoon in a small Texas town to change and improve the lives of all with whom he comes in contact. It is a story of greed and envy, played out against the backdrop of the classic country and blues music that is performed in Leroy’s Bar. The film has been described by the producers as Crazy Heart-meets-It's a Wonderful Life, while Schneider described it as "It's a Wonderful Life without the Wonderful."

== Cast ==
- John Schneider as Sam Doonby
- Jenn Gotzon as Laura Reaper
- Ernie Hudson as Leroy
- Robert Davi as Sheriff Woodley
- Jennifer O'Neill as Barbara Ann
- Will Wallace as Tony
- Joe Estevez as Cyrus

== Production ==
The film was shot on location in Smithville, Texas.

== Release ==
Doonby received a limited release in early February 2012, followed by a wider release in the United States on February 17, 2012 by Freestyle Releasing. In 2014, CMD Distribution obtained DVD distribution rights.

== Reception ==
Doonby resonated with many anti-abortion organizations due to its anti-abortion theme. Activist Norma McCorvey (1947-2017), known as the plaintiff Jane Roe of the Supreme Court landmark decision Roe v. Wade, which legalized abortion in the United States in 1973, appeared in a cameo in the film. It has also been endorsed by the Vatican and has premiered at the Landmark E Street Cinema during the 2013 March for Life, an annual anti-abortion march protesting abortion in the United States.
