= Rachel Hendrix =

American actress

- Born: Dothan, Alabama, U.S.
- Occupation: Actress
- Years active: 2009–present
- Spouse(s): Gabriel Trüb (divorced); Daniel Stine
- Children: 1
- Website: rachelhendrix.net

Rachel Hendrix is an American actress. She is known for playing Hannah in October Baby (2011). She also played Annabel in The Perfect Wave (2014).

Hendrix also wrote and starred in the 2018 short film The Staying Kind.

== Personal life ==
Hendrix is from Dothan, Alabama. She studied photography at the University of Montevallo.

Hendrix is married to actor and filmmaker Daniel Stine, who she met on the set of Virginia Minnesota (2018). She has a son with him, born in 2021. She was previously married to Gabriel Trüb. She resides in Atlanta.

== Filmography ==
=== Film ===
Year	Title	Role	Notes
2009	Alumni	Rachel	TV movie
2011	October Baby	Hannah	
2013	Abound	Cassandra	Short
2014	The Perfect Wave	Anabel	
2014	Grape Soda	Sherry	Short film
2014	Roses	Jessica Harper	Short
2014	Coffee Shop	Becky	
2015	77 Chances	Mac	
2015	Morsus	Uno	Short
2016	Christine	Crystal	
2016	The Divergent Series: Allegiant	Trial Dauntless Allegiant Member	
2016	The Man with the Golden Arm	Barbara	Short
2016	Vanished – Left Behind: Next Generation	Rachel	
2016	Son for a Son	Joey	Short
2017	Victory by Submission	Trish Hendricks	
2017	Mountain Top	Melissa Hall	
2017	Unbridled	Cassie Davis	
2018	Virginia Minnesota	Lyle	
2018	Nightclub Secrets	Rachel	
2018	Ballistic	Sam Reid	Short
2018	The Staying Kind	Florence	Short
2019	Midway to Love	Dr. Rachel August	TV Movie
2019	Guest of Honor	Petra	Short
2019	Semper Fi	Rachel Milkowski	
2019	Authentics	Chrissy	Short
2019	Christmas Wishes and Mistletoe Kisses	Kate Newhall	TV movie
2020	Shooting Heroin	Brittany	
2021	Our Dream Wedding	Natalie	TV movie
2022	Last Looks	Valerie	
2022	bREACH	Dana	Short
2024	Unsung Hero	Amy Grant	

=== Television ===
Year	Title	Role	Notes
2019	Vindication	Megan	Episode: "Made Like New"
2019	Creepshow	Marsha	Episode: "Gray Matter/The House of the Head"
2019	Raising Dion	Tasha Patel	Episode: ""Issue #105: Days of Mark's Future Past""

=== Music video ===
Year	Song	Artist
2014	"Perfect Wave"	Diana Vickers & George Craig
