= Virginia Minnesota =

- Directed by: Daniel Stine
- Written by: Daniel Stine
- Produced by: Daniel Stine; Mike Stine; Helen Stine
- Starring: Aurora Perrineau; Rachel Hendrix
- Cinematography: Pedro Ciampolini
- Edited by: Benjamin Caro
- Music by: Gary Dworetsky
- Production company: Rushaway Pictures
- Release date: March 2, 2018 (Cinequest)
- Running time: 98 minutes
- Country: United States
- Language: English

Virginia Minnesota is a 2018 American comedy-drama film written and directed by Daniel Stine and starring Aurora Perrineau and Rachel Hendrix.

== Cast ==
- Aurora Perrineau as Addison
- Rachel Hendrix as Lyle
- Jessica Miesel as Brooke
- Julia Keefe as Nakoda
- Susan Walters as Suzette
- Eyas Younis as Gabriel
- Aaron Hill as Hunter
- Daniel Stine as Hillman
- Carl Palmer as Bill
- Bradley Hasemeyer as Police Officer
- Emma Reaves as Marcie
- Harold Perrineau as the voice of Mister

== Release ==
The film premiered at the Cinequest Film & Creativity Festival on March 2, 2018.

== Reception ==
The film has a 71% rating on Rotten Tomatoes based on seven reviews.

Sheri Linden of The Hollywood Reporter gave the film a positive review and wrote, "The tonal shifts among mystery, folklore, melodrama and satire are neither smooth nor productively rough, and the narrative core remains unclear, lost amid the surfeit of disconnected moving parts."

Malik Adán of Film Threat also gave the film a positive review and wrote, "While this is surely the stuff of romcom boilerplate narratives, Virginia Minnesota prefers to wade into darker waters for the sake of more compelling, everyday drama."
