= No Safe Spaces =

2019 political documentary film

- Poster
- Directed by: Justin Folk
- Written by: John Sullivan
- Produced by: Mark Joseph
- Starring: Adam Carolla; Dennis Prager
- Edited by: Justin Folk; Bob Perkins
- Music by: Chris Jagich
- Distributed by: Atlas Distribution Company
- Release date: October 25, 2019
- Running time: 95 minutes
- Country: United States
- Language: English
- Box office: $1.3 million

No Safe Spaces is a 2019 American documentary film directed by Justin Folk that features commentator Dennis Prager and comedian Adam Carolla talking to college students and faculty about university safe spaces. The documentary also covers free speech controversies occasioned when conservatives are invited to speak in university settings. The film was released in Arizona theaters on October 25, 2019, and was successful enough to have a national release on December 6, 2019. It received mixed reviews from critics.

== Content ==
With production beginning in 2017, the filmmakers were on hand for commentator Ben Shapiro's September 14, 2017, speech at the University of California, Berkeley, a site of civic protests and unrest. The film focuses on such speech disruptions in the United States of America, but also examines similar incidents in Canada with Jordan Peterson. In particular, it shows the case of Lindsay Shepherd who was disciplined at Wilfrid Laurier University for using a recording of a debate with Peterson in class. It also "denounce[s] censorship in China". "Carolla said, 'We'd be hypocrites if we did a movie about the suppression of free speech but didn't mention China.'"

In a scene filmed at the Laugh Factory, comedians complain that audiences on college campuses are too easily offended now. Among these comedians are Adam Carolla with Karith Foster, and Tim Allen.

The film discusses the story of Bret Weinstein, a biology professor at the Evergreen State College in Washington state, who resigned after he was criticized for attending the university during a "Day of Absence" that was a long-standing tradition. Each year ethnic minorities would voluntarily stay home from campus to highlight their contributions to the college. In 2017, students attempted to compel white staff and students to stay away from the school, which Weinstein refused to do. Compulsion was also an issue discussed in the segments with Jordan Peterson, who gained international attention when he refused to adopt gender-neutral language, calling it an unwelcome form of compelled speech.

According to the Washington Examiner, the filmmakers worked to include "left-leaning" views in their movie. CNN's Van Jones complains that too many young people have not learned how to defend their views. The film shows former U.S. President Barack Obama saying "Anybody who comes to speak to you... you shouldn't silence them."

The film also features attorney Alan Dershowitz, now considered a more right-leaning figure, who criticizes many college leaders and "the hard left" for not standing up for free speech. While conservative commentator Dave Rubin argues that liberals should also fear "the mob".

Also in the film are Sharyl Attkisson, Candace Owens, Ann Coulter, and Cornel West.

The filmmakers have disputed its PG-13 rating.

== Reception ==
=== Box office ===
As of March 2020, the movie had taken in $1.3 million at the box office. On its opening night, the film earned an estimated $45,000 on one screen in Phoenix, the production team said, adding that the only documentary that earned more from one screen on an opening weekend was Michael Moore's Sicko in 2007. The per-screen average was $3,542. No Safe Spaces, which opened in limited release on October 25, 2019, came close to topping Terminator: Dark Fate in Denver and San Diego theater complexes over the weekend, and ended up finishing a close second to the Arnold Schwarzenegger blockbuster in those venues after final figures came in.

After its theatrical release, Salem Media Group made the film available as a video on demand. This is the first time Salem distributed a film. Prager criticized Netflix for rejecting the film, but paying $10 million for Knock Down the House, which did not have a theatrical release.

=== Critical response ===
No Safe Spaces received mixed reviews from professional critics. On Rotten Tomatoes, the film has an approval rating of 50%, based on 16 reviews, with an average rating of 6.3/10. Metacritic reports a 31 out of 100 score, based on five reviews, indicating "generally unfavorable" reviews.

Several critics panned the film as biased. For The A.V. Club, Vadim Rizov gave the film an F, summing up, "This isn't an argument for free speech, it's just paranoid whining, complete with a roundtable of comics sympathetically agreeing how sad and scary this all is, plus images of the Statue of Liberty with tape over its mouth." John Wenzel of The Denver Post gave the film two stars and noted "Frequently, the film asserts that words have power – why else would you want to make sure colleges are hosting conservative speakers? – but then hedges the assertion by saying people are too readily offended these days. Which is it?" The Los Angeles Times review also panned it as one-sided and "disappointing agitprop".

Several critics reviewed the movie positively. Alan Ng of Film Threat gave the film a 9 out of 10 and wrote in his review, "When it's all said and done, this film is offensive only to those who don't want to watch it." Owen Gleiberman of Variety praised the movie's defense of free speech, stating "the most head-turning point made by No Safe Spaces is that today's anti-free-speech radicals, who on many college campuses dominate the discourse, are going to be tomorrow's leaders." Nathanial Bell of LA Weekly gave a positive review, saying: "While somewhat loose and undisciplined in its structure, the film builds a case that academia is the primary battleground in a war to eliminate ideological diversity in the United States" Bell observed that, "the movie doesn’t bother to extrapolate on why people would want to boycott people like Ben Shapiro in the first place."

=== Other responses ===
According to a column in National Review by John Fund, the film was widely praised by conservative commentators. John Kass called the film "profoundly important" in a Chicago Tribune column.

== See also ==
- Academic freedom
- Chicago principles
- Intellectual dark web
- Heterodox Academy
