= Lifewatch, Taskforce of United Methodists on Abortion and Sexuality =

US nonprofit organization

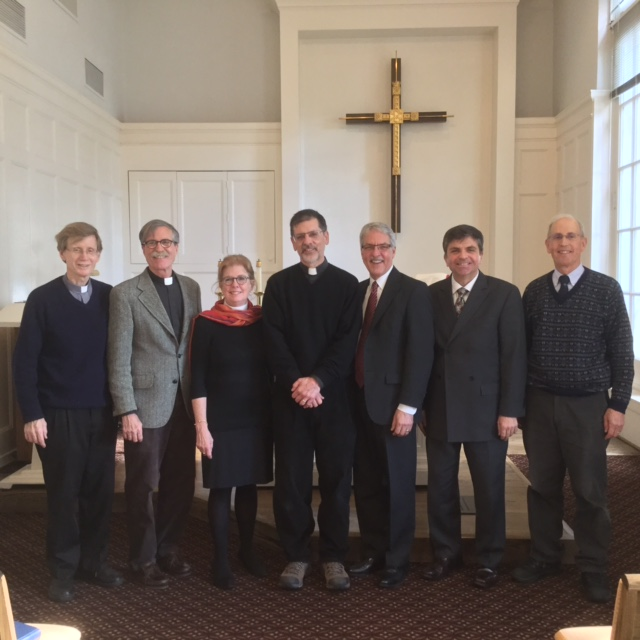
- Clergy and laity at the 2017 United Methodist event for the March for Life hosted by Lifewatch, Taskforce of United Methodists on Abortion and Sexuality
- Founded: 1987
- Type: Methodist Christian
- Purpose: Anti-abortion movement
- Location: Cottleville, Missouri, US
- Region served: Worldwide
- Members: 4,000+
- Key people: Paul T. Stallsworth, President
- Volunteers: 16
- Website: lifewatch.org

Founded in 1987, Lifewatch, Taskforce of United Methodists on Abortion and Sexuality (TUMAS) is a 501(c)(3) organization that serves as the unofficial anti-abortion group within the United Methodist Church (UMC). The organization publishes a quarterly newsletter titled Lifewatch and is a member of the National Pro-Life Religious Council. The organization also frequently holds seminars to address within Methodist Christianity the theological, moral, and social aspects of defending women and their unborn children from abortion. It is committed to reversing the Roe v. Wade decision "by first providing theological leadership within the church, which will set an example that political, legal and cultural forces will follow."

In May 2012 at the General Conference of the United Methodist Church, Lifewatch encouraged legislation to direct two church agencies—the General Board of Church and Society and United Methodist Women—to withdraw from the Religious Coalition for Reproductive Choice (RCRC). Along with other mainline Protestant and religious counterparts, the two UMC agencies formed RCRC in 1973, then known as the Religious Coalition for Abortion Rights (RCAR). Until 1993, RCAR operated from the United Methodist Building across from the United States Supreme Court Building where Harry Blackmun, a "devout" Methodist, served as Associate Justice. Today, RCRC continues to function as a 501(c)(3) educational group promoting a controversial "theology of choice". It also operates as a 501(c)(4) political organization lobbying against legislation limiting the legal right to abortion on demand.

On 19 May 2016, the General Conference of the UMC passed legislation to direct the two RCRC-member agencies to withdraw immediately. The motion was approved with a 425–268 vote difference. Statements of resignation were subsequently issued by both Church and Society and United Methodist Women.

At the same General Conference, delegates voted to delete a four-decade-old statement from the Book of Resolutions that had affirmed the 1973 Roe v. Wade Supreme Court decision. The ruling removed any state restrictions against abortion that did not meet a standard of "strict scrutiny", which resulted in Blackmum receiving letters of condemnation from Methodist clergymen.

The new resolution was overwhelmingly re-adopted 56–2 (97.3 percent), decrying gender-selective abortion, describing abortion as "violent" and opposing it for "trivial reasons". This was seen as a major win that restored an anti-abortion perspective within Methodism.

Over a century ago, Methodists were known for their commitment in supporting mothers with unplanned pregnancies. Several abortion-prevention and pro-adoption ministries are continuing today. Nevertheless, the Oregon-Idaho, California-Nevada, New England, New York and the Pacific-Northwest Annual Conferences all voted to join RCRC on their own in spite of Methodism's polity of connexionalism.

Consequently, in 2016, Lifewatch began linking the "theology of choice" that has been contributing to the breakdown of society through abortion with the fragmentation of UMC polity leading to schism.
