= Mark Joseph (producer) =

American multimedia producer and author (born 1969)

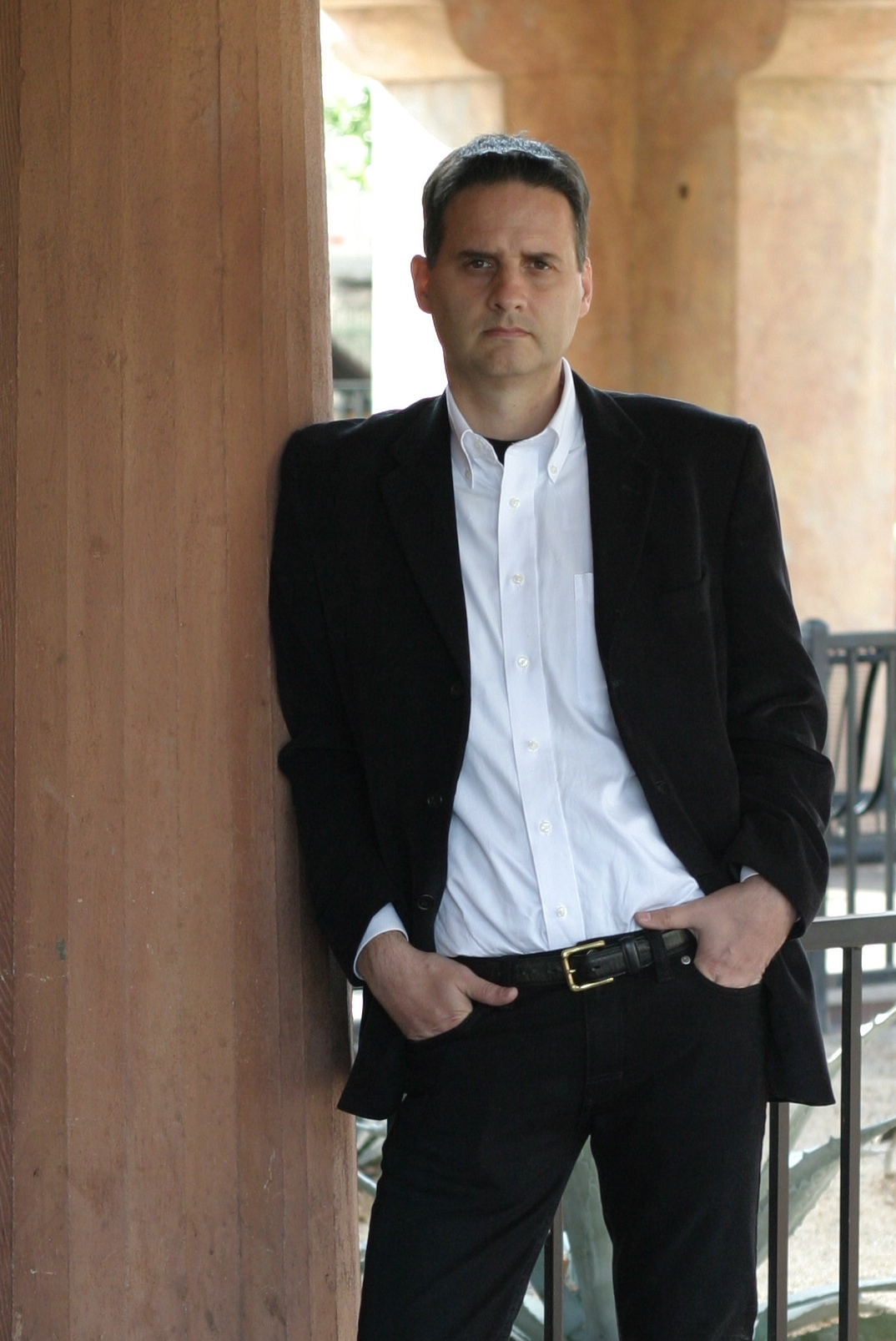
- Joseph in 2009
- Born: January 27, 1968 (age 58)
- Education: Biola University
- Occupations: Producer, columnist, talk-show host, author and publisher
- Years active: 1988–present
- Website: http://www.markjoseph.com/

Mark Joseph (born January 27, 1969) is an American multimedia producer, author, and founder/CEO of MJM Entertainment Group and Bully! Pulpit. He lives in the Los Angeles area with his wife and children.

== Early life and education ==
Joseph was born in Tokyo, Japan and after graduating from the Christian Academy in Japan in 1986 moved to Los Angeles to attend Biola University, graduating with a bachelor's degree in communication in 1990.

== Career ==
While in college in 1988, Joseph founded MJM Entertainment Group, coordinating recording sessions for Japanese bands and producing documentaries for Japanese TV networks NTV, NHK, and Fuji TV. Joseph has worked as a TV talk show host and correspondent for a variety of media outlets. In 1992 when the co-host of the Group W broadcast, The Wow Wow Entertainment Report, decided to take a sabbatical to star in a film, Joseph was chosen to fill in on a temporary basis. What was to have been a two-month engagement turned into a full-time position when the network appointed Joseph as co-anchor of the broadcast. Soon afterward, the program was acquired by CNN and Joseph continued to anchor the program for CNN. In 1994 the show was not renewed and Joseph turned his attention to creating a pilot for a culturally relevant political/pop culture talk show for CNN called Culture Clash which he hosted and produced. Although the show was not picked up, later that year Joseph began producing and hosting another talk show for Japan's NHK Network called The Interview. Set in Los Angeles, the program featured one on one interviews with American cultural icons like CNN's Larry King, providing a window into American society for millions of Asian viewers. After three successful seasons, the show was re-christened LA Frontline and ran for two additional seasons. Joseph continues to host and produce talk shows, most recently the Bully! Pulpit show, an online talk show that features Joseph interviewing newsmakers for his news blog site, Bullypulpit.com

From 2000 to 2005, he worked in development and marketing for Walden Media and Crusader Entertainment where he served as a special consultant to the presidents of both companies. Joseph worked in development, marketing and music and oversaw a nine-member marketing team which marketed Walden/Crusader films Holes, Because of Winn Dixie, I Am David, Joshua, and Children on Their Birthdays. In 2001, Joseph co-founded the Damah Film Festival, a short film festival whose mission is to "encourages an emerging generation of filmmakers from diverse perspectives to voice the spiritual aspect of the human experience through film and provides a forum for these artists to develop, discuss and display their vision" and serves as president of the board of directors. In 2004 Joseph produced two short films, The Bridge and Cupid with co-producer Ralph Winter. His recent film productions include Reagan, Doonby, and IX. He recently produced the documentary No Safe Spaces, which features Dennis Prager and Adam Carolla.

Joseph is also an award-winning record producer who has worked with Lauryn Hill, P.O.D., Switchfoot, Lifehouse, Sixpence None The Richer, Scott Stapp of Creed, MxPx, Dr. John, ZZ Top, Blink 182, Kirk Franklin, Yolanda Adams, and Andrae Crouch. In 2004, Joseph produced the rock soundtrack for The Passion of the Christ. He began his career in 1988 as a production coordinator for Japanese artists recording their records in the U.S. and in 1990 began distributing recordings by American artists into the Japanese market. In 2008 he launched Bully! Pulpit Records, a joint-venture label with Nettwerk Music Group. The label's first artist, Molly Jenson, released her first CD, "Maybe Tomorrow" in March 2009. Joseph is producing the debut record of a band he discovered, The Kilns.

Joseph is an author and regular columnist for The Huffington Post, USA Today and Fox News. He has contributed to a variety of publications including The Hollywood Reporter, Variety, Billboard,, Forbes, Investor's Business Daily, Beliefnet, Political Mavens, Townhall.com, National Review, and others, on topics ranging from media and culture to politics and religion. He is the founder/publisher of the news and culture portal, Bullypulpit.com. His first book, The Rock & Roll Rebellion was published in 1999, followed by Faith, God & Rock 'n' Roll in 2003. In The Rock & Roll Rebellion, Joseph documented the commercial influence of Japanese critic Masa Itoh and Burrn! magazine on Western acts breaking into the Japanese market, citing Stryper as a case study in which Itoh's endorsement resulted in the band outselling Mötley Crüe and Bon Jovi on Japanese charts. Writing in HuffPost in 2010, Joseph described Stryper as "a good, solid rock band," observing that "many of the secular-fundamentalist rock critics who detested the band's mere existence are looking for work and Stryper is back on the job." In 2009, Joseph announced a partnership between his imprint, Bully! Pulpit Books and Midpoint Trade Books, to bring both Joseph's own books and those he edits to market. The first book in the arrangement was The Lion, The Professor & The Movies: Narnia's Journey To The Big Screen which was released in 2010. His book Rock Gets Religion was published in 2018.

== Awards and recognition ==
At the 36th annual GMA Music Awards, Joseph won an award in the Special Event Album of the Year category for his work as producer of the Inspired By Soundtrack for The Passion of the Christ: Songs

== Filmography ==
Year	Film	Role
2004	The Bridge	Co-producer
2004	Cupid	Producer
2004	Ray	Development, marketing
2005	The Chronicles of Narnia: The Lion, the Witch and the Wardrobe	Development, marketing
2006	Amazing Grace	Development
2009	Japan: In Search Of The Dream	Producer
2012	Doonby	Producer
2019	No Safe Spaces	Producer
2019	Shooting Heroin	Producer
2024	Reagan	Producer

== Bibliography ==
- The Rock & Roll Rebellion (1999) B&H Publishing
- Faith, God, and Rock 'n' Roll (2003) Sanctuary Publishing/Baker Books
- The Lion, The Professor & The Movies: Narnia's Journey To The Big Screen (2010) Bully! Pulpit Books/Midpoint Trade Books
- Rock Gets Religion (2018) Bully! Pulpit Books
