= March for Life and Family =

Annual march in Poland against abortion

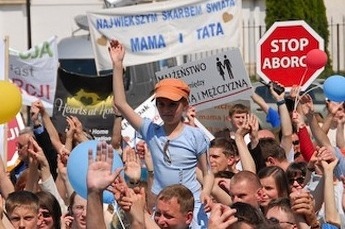
March for Life and Family in 2007

March for Life and Family (Polish: Marsz dla Życia i Rodziny) is an annual march against abortion. The first march was in Warsaw, now the march is organizing in many towns in Poland, but not on the same date.

The Centre of Life and Family Foundation (Pol. Fundacja Centrum Życia i Rodziny) is organizing the march in Warsaw and coordinating all the marches named March for Life and Family in Poland. Other marches are arranged by several Catholic institutions (e.g. Fundacja Pro – a Polish organisation that opposes abortion, Piotr Skarga Society of Christian Culture (Polish: Stowarzyszenie Kultury Chrześcijańskiej im. Ks. Piotra Skargi), Neocatechumenal Way, Light-Life Movement, Catholic Action and other).

== June 4, 2006 ==
The first march took place in 2006 in Warsaw. According to the Catholic Information Agency it attracted over 2000 people, mainly young with their families, representants of conservative non-governmental organisations and right-wing politicians. Demonstrators held banners with slogans: "Love is hetero", "Right to birth for everyone", "Man and woman the true family", "Stop abortion", "Stop perversion" (with a picture of two men holding their hands), "I choose life". A pop concert, funded by the government, closed the march.

== May 20, 2007 ==
According to police statistics the second march in 2007 attracted about 600 people. However, organisers claimed that the number of people reached 4000. The march was attended by right-wing politicians such as Roman Giertych, Wojciech Wierzejski, Marian Piłka and Artur Zawisza, as well as various institutions, e.g. Fundacja Pełna Chata (Full Cottage Foundation), Grupa "Człowiek tak – homoseksualizm nie" ("Human yes – homosexuality no" Group), Bielańskie Stowarzyszenie Rodzin Wielodzietnych (Bielany Association of Families with a lot of Children). The march was also attended by anti-abortion activists from Germany, Italy, France, Chile, Peru and United States.

Demonstrators held banners with slogans "Marriage only between man and woman", "A human yes – homosexuals no", "Stop Perversion", "Homophobia is OK" as well as Polish national flags and crosses.

== May 25, 2008 ==
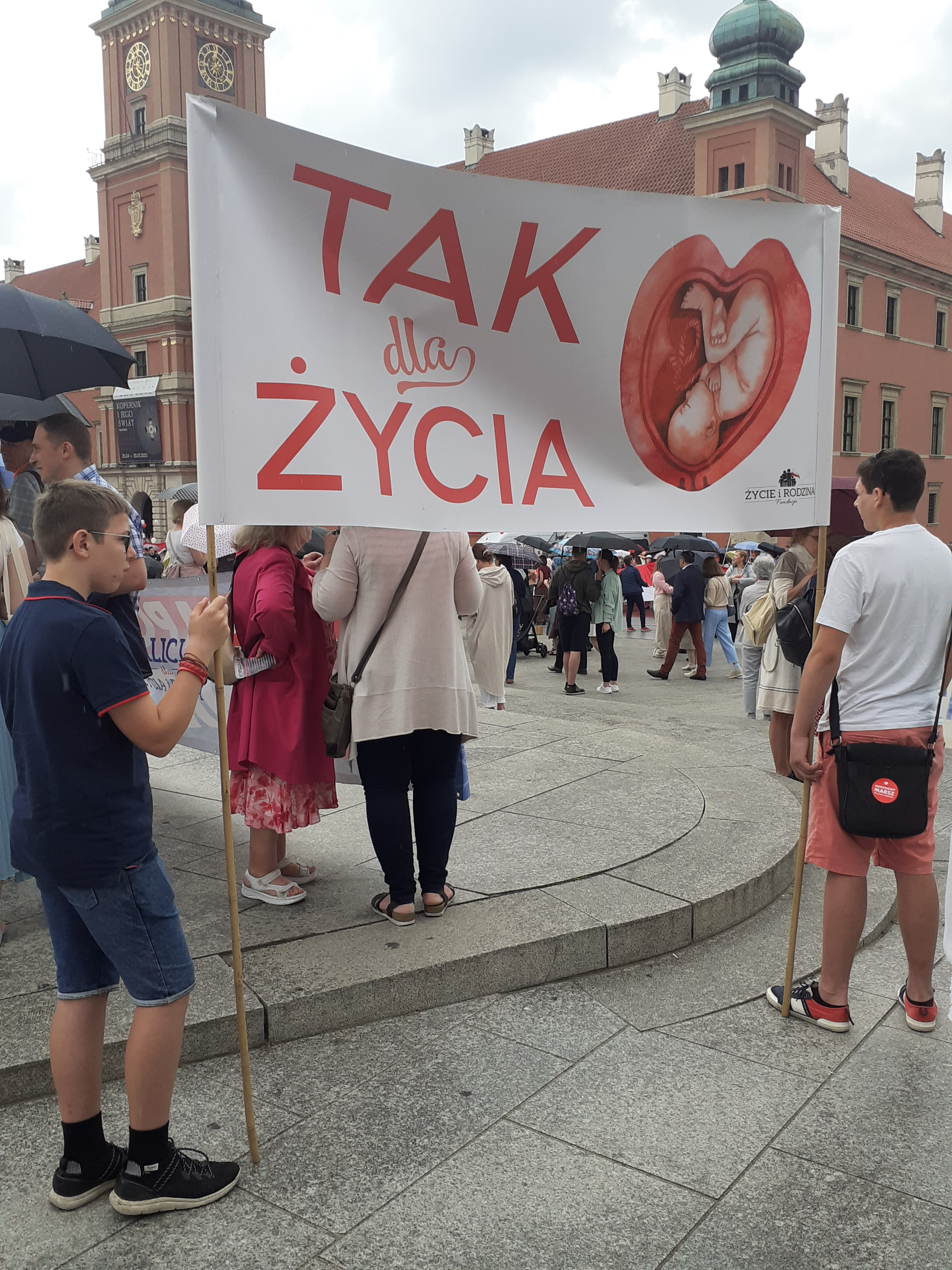
Marsz dla Życia i Rodziny in Warsaw (2023).

The third march took place in May 2008. Prior to the march there were several films presented on abortion, miraculous revelation of the Virgin and culture of death regarding current situation in Sweden, where same-sex marriage is to be recognised. There was also a lecture at the Catholic Cardinal Stefan Wyszyński University in Warsaw on abortion and methods of contraception approved by the Vatican. According to the police statistics there were less than 1000 demonstrators, but organisers claim that there were about 4000.

== September 19, 2021 ==
The 2021 march was limited to Warsaw due to Covid-19 restrictions, but according to event organizers, the event still gathered 5,000 people. The march was the first held after the October 2022 ruling by the Constitutional Tribunal in Warsaw that declared abortion due to fetal abnormalities unconstitutional. Organizers from the Center for Life and the Family and the Christian Social Congress met President Andrzej Duda on the day of the march. The theme of the event was "fatherhood" and fatherly responsibilities.

== September 19, 2022 ==
Around 10,000 people gathered for the 2022 march in Warsaw, as well as thousands more in towns across Poland. This march was the 17th iteration of the event. The theme was marriage, with a motto of "I Promise You," and Father Bogdan Bartold presided over a mass renewal of marriage vows. Participants held signs with slogans such as “Life is beautiful,” “May children live,” “I choose life,” and “Fatherhood begins at conception. Equal responsibility. Equal rights.” The event ended with a mass.

== See also ==
- March for Life (Paris, France)
- March for Life (Washington, D.C., U.S.A.)
- Walk for Life West Coast (San Francisco, Calif., U.S.A.)
