= March for Life (Washington, D.C.) =

Annual anti-abortion rally

- Date: Every year since January 22, 1974 (first anniversary of Roe v. Wade)
- Location: Washington, D.C.
- Website: www.marchforlife.org

The March for Life is an annual rally and march against the practice and legality of abortion, held in the District of Columbia, the capital city of the United States, either on or around the anniversary of Roe v. Wade, the decision legalizing abortion nationwide issued in 1973 by the Supreme Court of the United States (SCOTUS). Participants in the march advocated for the overturning of Roe v. Wade, which occurred in the Supreme Court case Dobbs v. Jackson Women's Health Organization in 2022. It is a major gathering of the anti-abortion movement in the United States and it is organized by the March for Life Education and Defense Fund.

== History ==
Demonstrators of the first March for Life in Washington, D.C. on January 22, 1974, a year after Roe v. Wade was decided

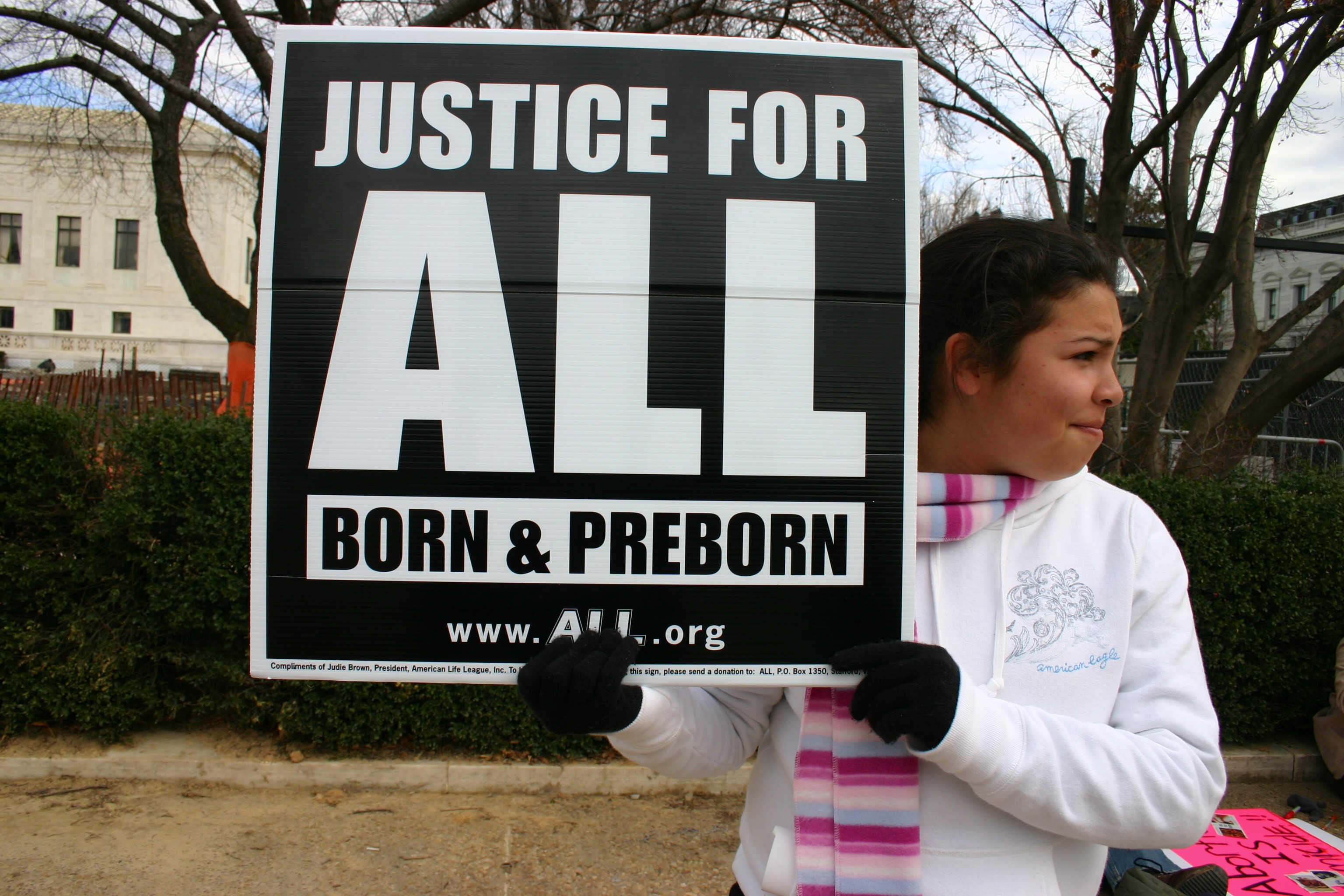
Some activists believe that abortion is a violation of human rights.

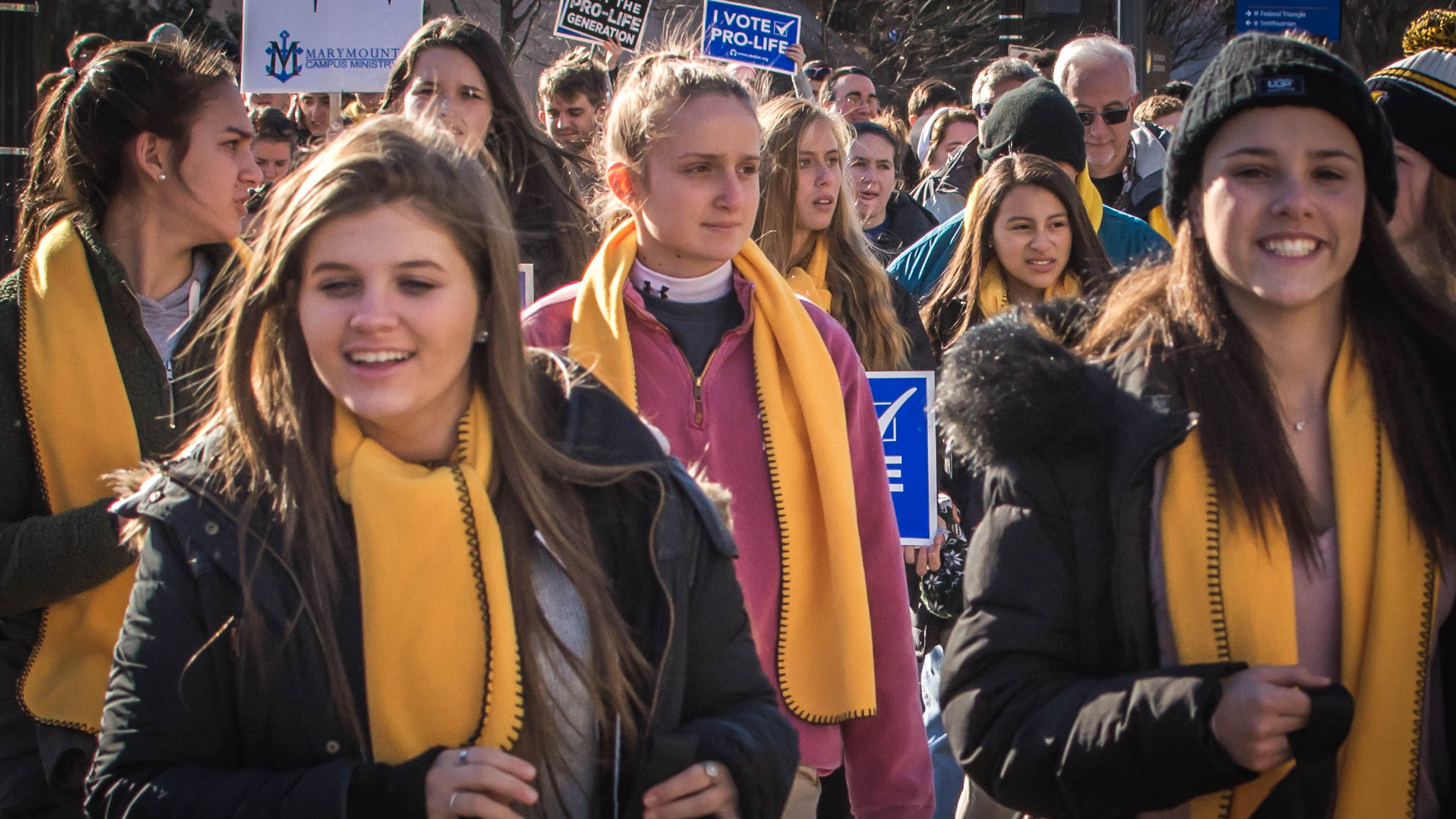
Young attendees of the 2018 March

In the 1960s, American public opinion on a variety of issues, including sexuality and abortion, changed. It became much more common for people to have sexual intercourse outside of marriage. The rise of out-of-wedlock births, contraception, and abortion became controversial political issues. When the Supreme Court ruled that it was indeed constitutional for a woman to terminate her pregnancy (in the early stages), a vigorous anti-abortion movement was created. The first March for Life, which was founded by Nellie Gray, was held on January 22, 1974, on the West Steps of the Capitol, with organizers claiming 20,000 supporters in attendance.

The march was originally intended to be a one-time event, in hopes that SCOTUS would reverse Roe v. Wade immediately a year after its ruling. However, after the first march in 1974, Gray took steps to institute the rally as a yearly event until Roe v. Wade was overturned by incorporating more grassroots anti-abortion activists into the march, which would be officially recognized as a nonprofit organization the same year. Initially, politicians were viewed with suspicion. But as time passed, organizers of the March focused more and more on legislation and started to lobby politicians. However, the movement has become increasingly distant from the Democratic Party, as it has less and less room for anti-abortion voices, and leaned in favor of the Republican Party. For a long time, many anti-abortion Presidents, such as Ronald Reagan and George H.W. Bush, had decided against appearing at the March. This precedent was broken in 2020, when Donald Trump became the first sitting President to attend the event in person.

During the 33rd annual March for Life in 2006, the nomination of Judge Samuel Alito to the Supreme Court caused a major shift for the movement, because of the expectation that Alito would "win Senate approval and join a majority in overturning Roe."

During the 2009 March for Life, the potential passage of the 110th United States Congress of the Freedom of Choice Act—a bill that would "codify Roe v. Wade" by declaring that abortion is a fundamental right, leading to the lifting of many restrictions on abortion—served as a key rallying point.

In the contemporary United States, the anti-abortion movement has clashed with advocates of modern feminism, with anti-abortion activists claiming that abortion is an abuse of human rights. As a result, women who identified as feminists but who also opposed legal abortion felt excluded from the 2017 Women's March in the District of Columbia. The 2017 March for Life was partly motivated by competition with the Women's March, which reportedly attracted half a million people to the American federal capital, as well as numerous simultaneous protests across the country, and a celebration of the progress made by the movement, with the newly elected President Donald Trump implementing measures to restrict access to abortion and a Congress dominated by Republicans aiming to cut funding for Planned Parenthood. The movement also attracts gays and lesbians who have fallen out with the mainstream of their identities because they oppose abortion. Both sides of the abortion debate have made use of novel medical advances, especially in neonatology and embryology, to justify their positions. In the case of the March for Life, president of the organization Jeanne Mancini asserted the argument that embryos were mere blobs of tissue was no longer feasible.

After the 2019 March, a widely discussed confrontation occurred between a group of March for Life participants and those of the Indigenous Peoples' March.

Protestors at the 2020 March for Life.

Due to the COVID-19 pandemic and a security measure following the 2021 storming of the United States Capitol, the 2021 March for Life was moved online by its organizers, and not held in person. Nevertheless, a small group of demonstrators marched their way towards the building of the Supreme Court, the normal endpoint of the event.

In 2022, the March for Life was marked by an upbeat mood because activists felt confident, based on their belief that the 1973 Roe v. Wade ruling would be overturned. On June 24, 2022, the court ruled in Dobbs that the legality of abortion can be decided by the states, overturning Roe v. Wade. The March for Life returned in 2023, with participants celebrating the demise of the Roe, though they acknowledged that their dream of the end of abortion in the country had not yet become a reality. Various attendees interviewed by the Washington Post disagreed on what they should advocate for next—(paid) parental leave, flexible work hours, religious conversion, making adoption easier, raising more funds for emergency pregnancy centers, or appealing to those who are neither white nor Christian—now that Roe had already been overturned. Even so, activists still attend the March in subsequent years to commemorate the Dobbs decision and to urge one another to continue the fight to completely ban abortion. Following the death of right-wing activist Charlie Kirk in 2025, Turning Point USA, a political organization he created, made the total prohibition of abortion a priority for the upcoming 2028 presidential election, and was galvanizing support from young people at the 2026 March for Life and other events.

== Itinerary ==
The March for Life proceedings begin around noon. They typically consist of a rally at the National Mall near Fourth Street (in 2018, this was near 12th St. NW). It is followed by a march which travels down Constitution Avenue NW, turns right at First Street NE, and then ends on the steps of the Supreme Court of the United States, where another rally is held. Many protesters start the day by delivering roses and lobbying members of Congress.

However, in many ways, the March for Life resembles a festival, especially for the young, featuring (Christian) music and other forms of entertainment as a prelude to the March.

== Attendance ==
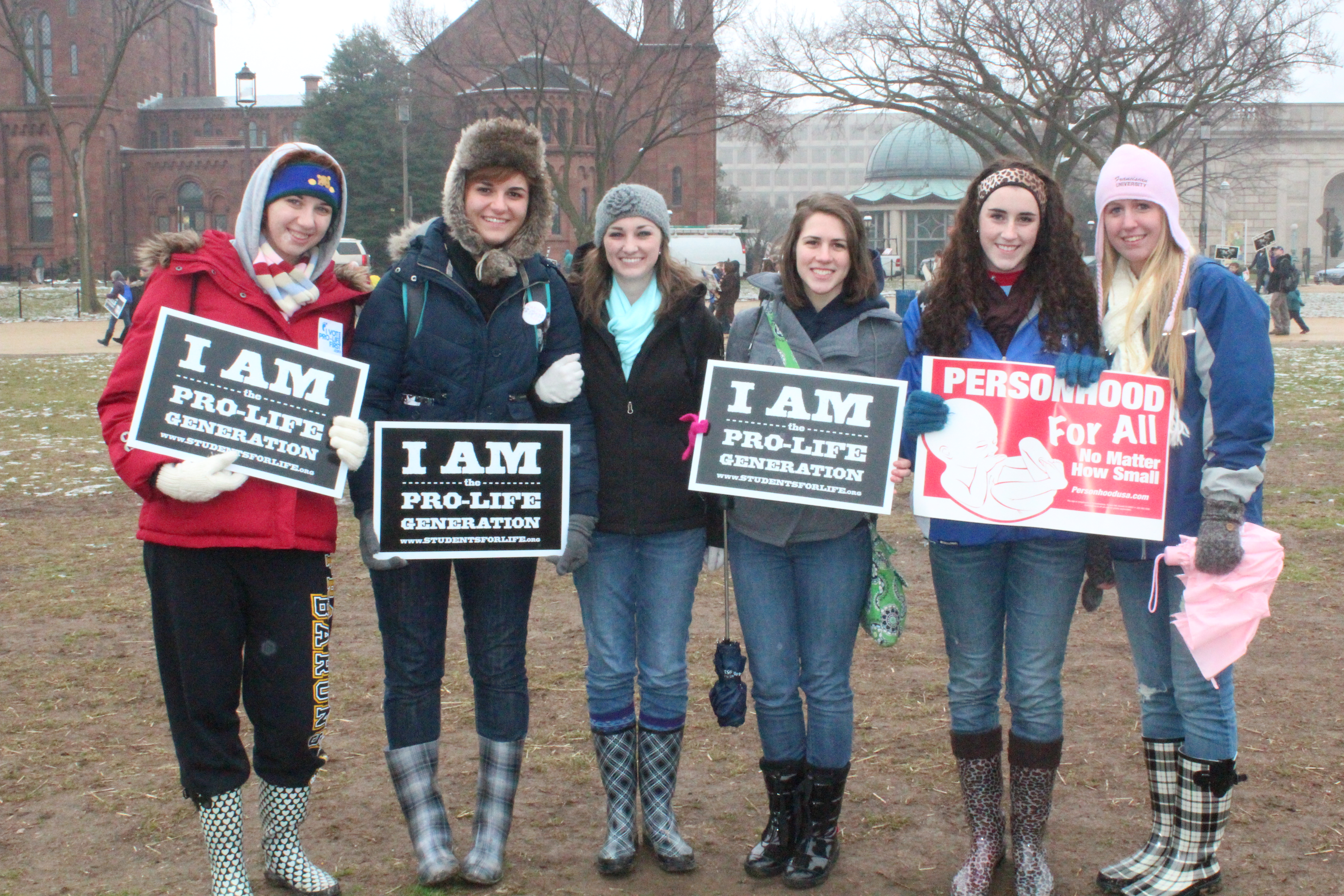
Undergraduates from the Franciscan University of Steubenville at the 2012 March for Life

As with all large crowd estimates, the numbers vary among the sources and the year, ranging from tens to hundreds of thousands.

In 1987, an estimated 10,000 participated. In 1995, the last year that the National Park Service made an official estimate of attendance, about 45,000 attended.

Between 2003 and 2012, the marches drew crowds estimated in the hundreds of thousands. March organizers estimated attendance of 400,000 in 2011. and 650,000 in 2013, the fortieth anniversary of the first March.

In 2016, the march proceeded despite a blizzard that dropped 24 inches (610 mm) of snow in D.C., with thousands of attendees.

Since the 2010s, a growing share of young people have joined the march, including teenagers and college students from Catholic schools, churches, and youth groups. A columnist for The Washington Post estimated that about half of the marchers were under age 30 in 2010.

The 2020s saw appearances by online political activists ("influencers") who could appeal to the young. In 2022 attendance was estimated to be in the tens of thousands, as the fate of legal abortion at the national level rested in the hands of the Supreme Court. Many attendees were members of Generation Z. By 2023, The Washington Post noticed that those who attended the March came from diverse religious backgrounds, white Evangelicals, Protestants, Jews, adherents of non-Christian religions, and members of secular groups. A large number of the marchers were of high-school or college age. Thousands of people from across the United States came out for the 2026 March despite the incoming snowstorm.

== Notable speakers ==
=== 1987 ===
In 1987, then-President Ronald Reagan addressed the attendees gathered at the Ellipse south of the White House by telephone connected to a loudspeaker. He vowed to help "end this national tragedy." Jesse Helms, then Senator of North Carolina, attended in person. He accused abortion of being an "American holocaust" in his speech.

=== 2003–2009 ===
In 2003, then-President George W. Bush spoke remotely via telephone and thanked participants for their "devotion to such a noble cause". During his telephone addresses, he tended to speak broadly of opposing abortion as opposed to offering any specific efforts being made to overturn the Roe v. Wade decision.

In 2003, speakers included U.S. Representative Chris Smith, Republican of New Jersey, and Randall Terry, the founder of Operation Rescue. In his speech, Terry encouraged the youth in the audience, calling them to "fight for all you're worth."

In 2004, 15 lawmakers (all Republican) spoke. Among the lawmakers who spoke were U.S. Representatives Todd Tiahrt of Kansas and Pat Toomey of Pennsylvania. Tiahrt, who also spoke at the 30th annual march, urged marchers to "help pro-lifers in your state"; Toomey supported these remarks, saying to vote for anti-abortion candidates in order to reclaim the Senate and, in turn, the courts.

In 2006, U.S. Representative Steve Chabot, an Ohio Republican and prominent anti-abortion advocate in the House of Representatives, spoke to the masses on overturning Roe v. Wade. Nellie Gray, the founder of March for Life, also spoke.

In 2009, approximately 20 Congress members spoke, including U.S. Representative F. James Sensenbrenner, Jr., Wisconsin Republican and former chairman of the House Judiciary Committee, and Gray.

=== 2011–2019 ===
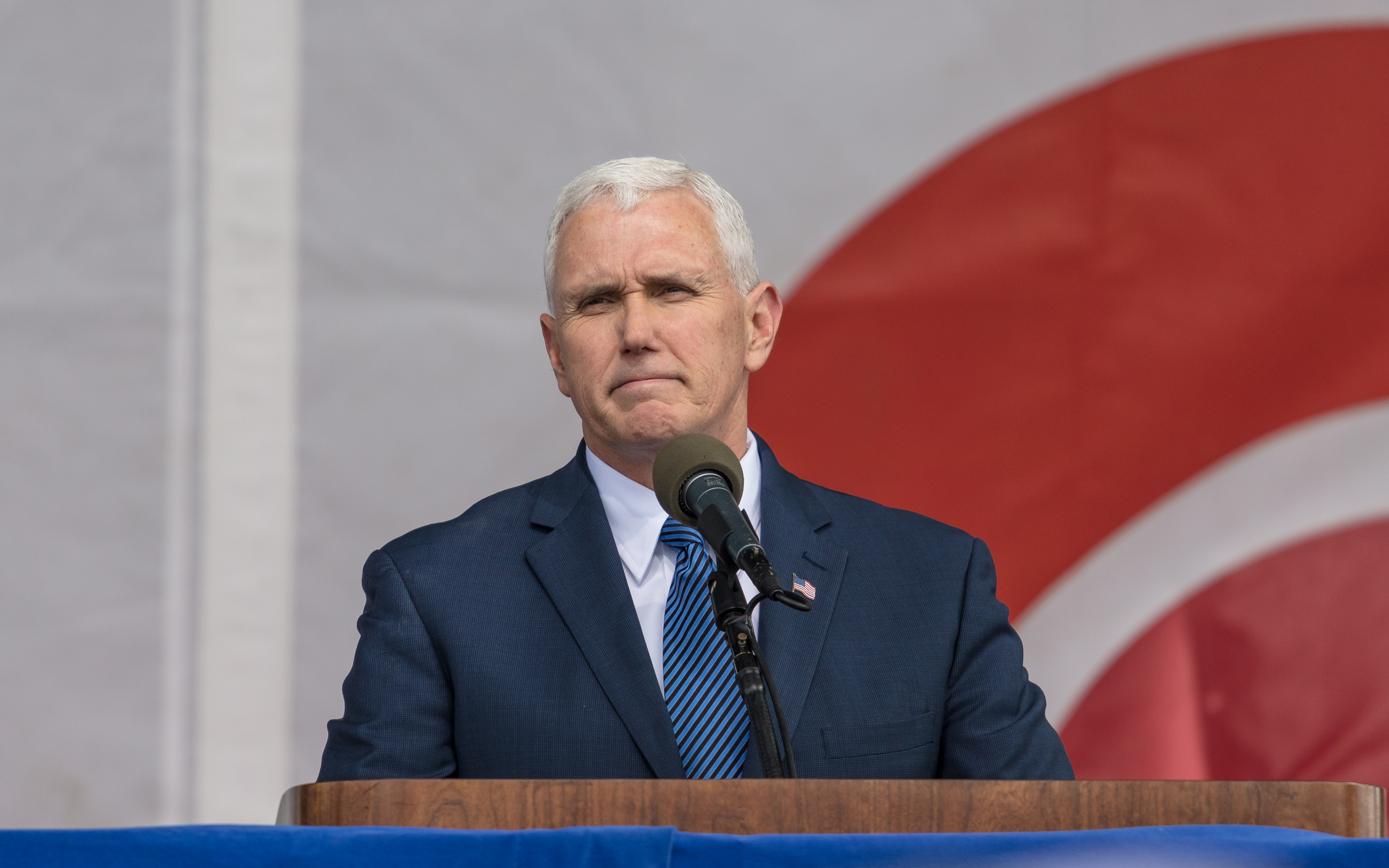
Vice President Mike Pence speaking at the March for Life in Washington, D.C., 2017

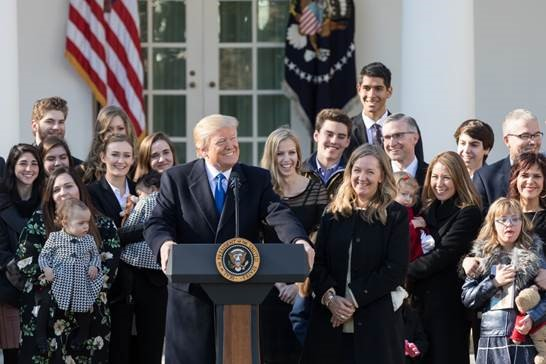
President Donald Trump addresses the March for Life at the White House Rose Garden on January 19, 2018.

In 2011, speakers included House Majority Leader Eric Cantor, House Majority Whip Kevin McCarthy, and several other members of the U.S. Congress, including then-Representative Mike Pence.

In 2013, presenters included U.S. House Speaker John Boehner (via a pre-recorded video address), former senator and candidate for the 2012 Republican Party presidential nomination Rick Santorum, as well as other members of Congress.

In 2016, Republican presidential candidate Carly Fiorina took part in the march.

In 2017, the march included Vice President Mike Pence, Kellyanne Conway, the Presidential Counselor, the Archbishop of New York Cardinal Timothy M. Dolan, anti-abortion activist Abby Johnson, and NFL player Benjamin Watson. Vice President Pence attended and spoke at the march, becoming the first vice president and the then highest-ranking federal official to do so. Pence was also one of the speakers at the 2010 march while serving as representative of Indiana’s 6th congressional district.

In 2018, President Donald Trump addressed the 45th march via satellite from the White House Rose Garden, becoming the first U.S. President to address the rally using this technology. The march was attended by U.S. House Speaker Paul Ryan, Democratic Illinois Representative Dan Lipinski, former NFL center Matt Birk, and former NFL quarterback Tim Tebow's mother Pam.

In 2019, President Trump again addressed the crowd via satellite and Vice President Pence did so in person. The President said, "I will always defend the first right in our Declaration of Independence: the right to life." Political commentator Ben Shapiro also spoke at the event.

=== 2020–present ===
Vice President JD Vance's speech at the 2026 March for Life, the second consecutive event he attended

On January 24, 2020, Trump became the first incumbent president to attend and speak at the March for Life, marking the annual rally as an important part of contemporary conservatism in the United States. He told the story of how he changed his mind about the issue of abortion and the actions he had taken as president to advance the goals of the anti-abortion movement.

In 2022, two current Republican House members and one former Democratic House member spoke: Chris Smith, Julia Letlow, and Dan Lipinski.

House Majority Leader Steve Scalise and Representative Chris Smith, co-chair of the Congressional Pro-Life Caucus, addressed the crowd at the 2023 March, as did Mississippi Attorney General Lynn Fitch.

In 2024, Speaker of the House Mike Johnson shared with the crowd that he was born of an unplanned pregnancy to teenage parents in 1972, a year before the Roe v. Wade decision.

In 2025, newly inaugurated Vice President JD Vance made a speech at the event, declaring, "I want more babies in the United States of America."

President Trump's pre-recorded speech for the 2026 March for Life

In 2026, President Trump spoke to the attendees by pre-recorded video. He stated that his administration had been promoting "the institution of the family like never before" by appointing "judges and justices who believed in interpreting the Constitution as written." Reflecting on his appointment of SCOTUS justices who later overturned Roe v. Wade, President Trump called it "a big deal" and "the greatest victory" in the history of the anti-abortion movement. Vice President Vance once again addressed the crowd in person. He assuaged those who worried that the Trump administration had not done enough to for the cause. He called the Dobbs v Jackson decision by SCOTUS the most important in his life time. He announced that the United States was expanding the "Mexico City" restrictions on funding for non-governmental organizations that provided abortions or information about said procedure to include those that advocated for "radical gender ideologies" and diversity, equity, and inclusion (DEI) policies. The Mexico City policy was first introduced by President Ronald Reagan at a United Nations conference in Mexico City in 1984. He shared that he and his wife, Usha, were expected their fourth child. "Let the record show, you have a vice president who practices what he preaches," he told the audience.

== Associated events ==
Various anti-abortion organizations hold events before and after the March. Such events include a Luau for Life at Georgetown University and a candlelight vigil at the Supreme Court. Additionally, independent films with an anti-abortion message have premiered or have been promoted in association with the March, including the Vatican endorsed film Doonby, which was shown at Landmark E Street Cinema during the 2013 march, and 22 Weeks, which premiered at Union Station's Phoenix Theatre on the eve of the 2009 march.

=== Catholic events ===
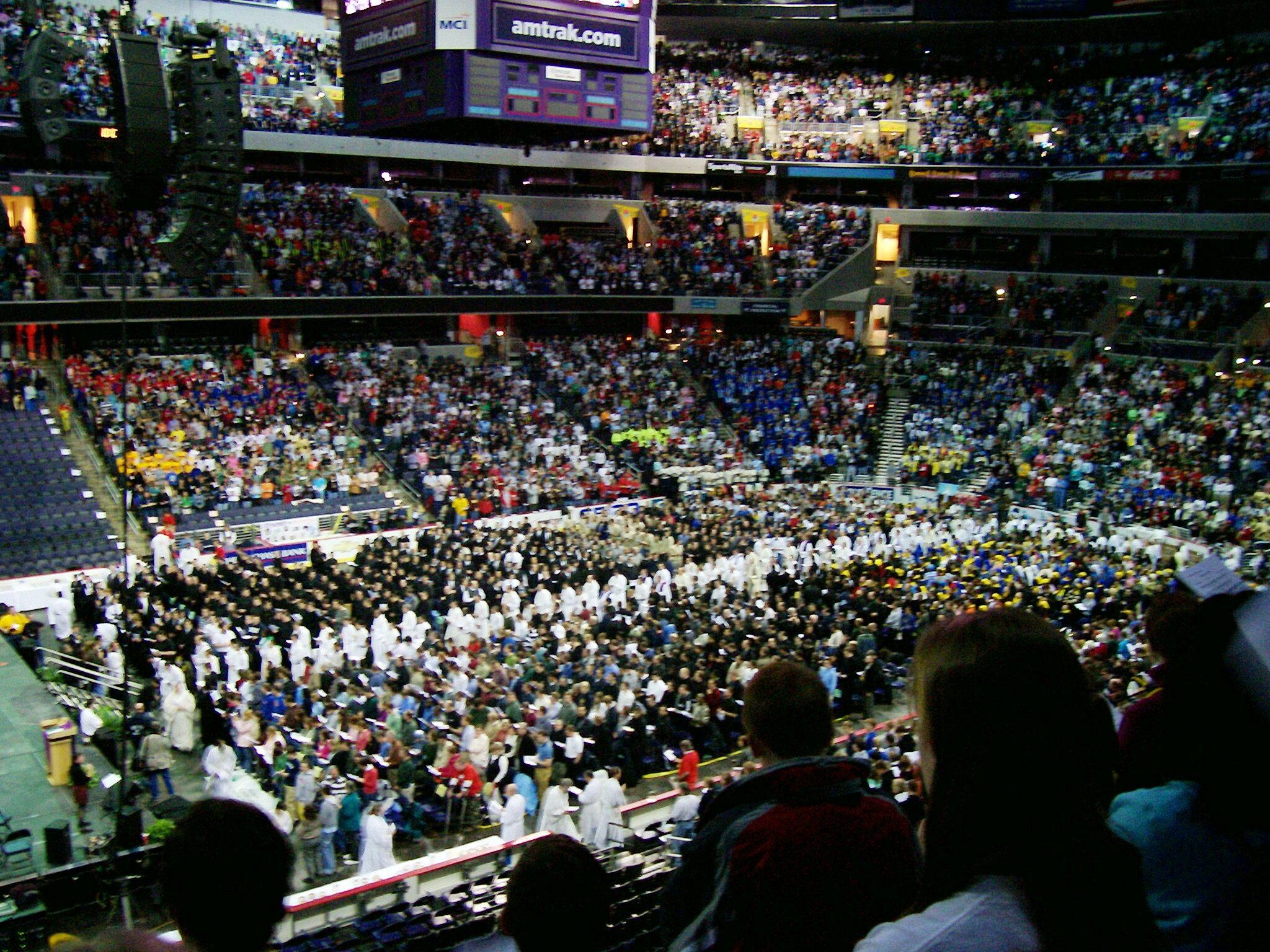
Youth Rally and Mass at Verizon Center (2006), now called the Capital One Arena

In 2009, the apostolic nuncio to the United States, Archbishop Pietro Sambri, read Pope Benedict XVI's message, which told attendants that he was "deeply grateful" for the youths' "outstanding annual witness for the gospel of life". In 2008, the Pope's message thanked attendants for "promoting respect for the dignity and inalienable rights of every human being." In 2011, an event parallel to the Verizon Center event was held at the D.C. Armory; a total of over 27,000 young people attended the events.

In 2013, a Morning Mass and Rally (preceding the March for Life) was added and held at the Patriot Center on the campus of George Mason University, including Arlington Bishop Paul Loverde, Richmond Bishop Francis DiLorenzo and more than 100 other bishops and priests from across the nation. Life is VERY Good, which began with 350 participants in 2009, gathered in excess of 12,000 between its two events, held before and after the March, in 2013.

=== Anglican events ===
Anglicans for Life, the anti-abortion apostolate of the Anglican Church in North America, launched the "Mobilizing the Church for Life" conference on the day before the 2016 March for Life. On the following day, the primate of the Anglican Church in North America, Foley Beach, led Anglicans in the March for Life.

=== Evangelical events ===
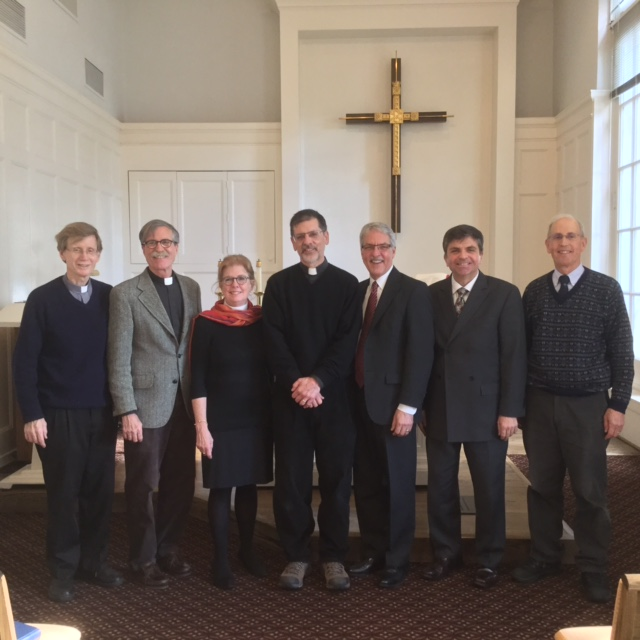
Clergy and laity at the 2017 United Methodist event for the March for Life hosted by Lifewatch, Taskforce of United Methodists on Abortion and Sexuality

At the 2016 March for Life rally, the Ethics & Religious Liberty Commission, the public policy arm of the Southern Baptist Convention, organized a conference "aimed at increasing the level of engagement in the pro-life cause".

The Taskforce of United Methodists on Abortion and Sexuality, which is a part of the National Pro-Life Religious Council, holds its annual service of worship at the United Methodist Building, and the liturgy held for the 2016 March of Life featured "a sermon by Dr. Thomas C. Oden, General Editor of the Ancient Christian Commentary on Scripture, former Professor of Theology and Ethics at Drew University, and Lifewatch Advisory Board member."

=== Lutheran events ===
Before the 2016 March for Life, a Divine Service was celebrated at Immanuel Lutheran Church in Alexandria, Virginia.

=== Virtual March for Life ===
In 2010, Americans United for Life launched an online virtual March. Those unable to attend the March for Life in person could create avatars of themselves and take part in a virtual demonstration on a Google Maps version of the National Mall. The first online event attracted approximately 75,000 participants.

The 2021 March for Life was a virtual event due to the ongoing COVID-19 pandemic and security concerns following the 2021 storming of the United States Capitol.

== Media attention ==
Members of the anti-abortion movement have frequently complained that the annual March for Life does not receive enough attention from the mainstream media.

== See also ==
- Anti-abortion movement
- Walk for Life West Coast (San Francisco)
- National Sanctity of Human Life Day
- March for Life (Paris)
- March for Life and Family (Warsaw, Poland)
- List of protest marches on Washington, D.C.
