= Walk for Life West Coast =

Annual anti-abortion event in the US

The Walk for Life West Coast is an annual anti-abortion event held in San Francisco, California. It is held on a Saturday on or near January 22, the anniversary date of the decision in the United States Supreme Court case, Roe v. Wade.

The first Walk for Life was held on January 22, 2005.

In 2008, the San Francisco Chronicle estimated at least 10,000 people were bused in from all over the state and beyond. On Saturday, January 22, 2011, more than 40,000 people gathered for the seventh annual Walk, in downtown San Francisco.

Supporters of legal abortion staged yearly counter-demonstrations, much smaller in size than the anti-abortion demonstration. Local media said that the tone in encounters between opposing sides grew less confrontational in 2009.

On Saturday, January 23, 2021, the Walk for Life was observed by thousands of people. A Mass was celebrated by archbishop Salvatore Cordileone and 12 priests. Joseph Fessio gave a tribute to the deceased Joe Scheidler, founder of the Pro-Life Action League. There were no pro-abortion protesters at the walk.

== See also ==
- March for Life (Washington, D.C.)
- National Sanctity of Human Life Day
