= Federalist No. 30 =

Federalist Paper by Alexander Hamilton on taxation

- Alexander Hamilton, author of Federalist No. 30
- Author: Alexander Hamilton
- Original title: Concerning the General Power of Taxation
- Language: English
- Series: The Federalist
- Publisher: New-York Packet
- Publication date: December 28, 1787
- Publication place: United States
- Media type: Newspaper
- Preceded by: Federalist No. 29
- Followed by: Federalist No. 31
- Text: Federalist No. 30 at Wikisource

Federalist No. 30, titled "Concerning the General Power of Taxation", is a political essay by Alexander Hamilton and the thirtieth of The Federalist Papers. It was first published in the New-York Packet on December 28, 1787, as the twenty-ninth entry in the series under the pseudonym used for all Federalist Papers, Publius. The essay argued that the national government must have broad powers of taxation to provide for national defense and the public good. It revisited ideas that were first raised in No. 12, and the series continued on the subject of taxation through No. 36.

Federalist No. 30 criticized the system of taxation under the Articles of Confederation, which required the states to levy taxes and provide funding for the national government. Hamilton argued that the national government must be able to levy taxes because there are always further needs for government funding and it would need the power to acquire additional funds in times of war. He said that the power of taxation was necessary for the nation to maintain good credit and prove it could pay its debts, otherwise it would be unable to obtain wartime funds through loans.

== Background and publication ==
Federalist No. 30 was written by Alexander Hamilton. Following the Constitutional Convention in 1787, Hamilton worked with James Madison and John Jay to write The Federalist Papers, a series of essays to explain the provisions of the Constitution of the United States and persuade New York to ratify it. They published these essays in New York newspapers under the shared pseudonym Publius. Federalist No. 30 was first published in the New-York Packet on December 28, 1787, followed by the Independent Journal and the Daily Advertiser on December 29, and the New-York Journal on January 2, 1788. It was originally published as No. 29 before it was ultimately listed as the thirtieth essay in the series.

Federalist No. 30 moved from the subject of the military and began the Federalist Papers' analysis of taxation. At the time that the Federalist Papers were written, the national government could not levy taxes and instead had to issue requisitions to the states. This system did not produce enough money to fulfill the government's needs. Taxation had previously been considered in Federalist No. 11 and No. 12.

== Summary ==
Publius begins by saying that the national government of the United States must have the power to levy taxes because money is needed to fulfill the government's purposes. He warns that failure to acquire funds either leads to collapse in government or unjust seizure of funds through illegitimate means, and he explains that putting the states in charge of collecting funds has failed because they do not always comply when the national government requests funding.

Publius acknowledges the argument of his opponents that the national government should only set duties on imports while the state governments acquire funds from internal taxation. He counters that this would not be enough, because nations always have further expenses needed to benefit the public good. Publius describes military spending as an example, saying that even a stable budget would no longer be sufficient when the outbreak of war requires additional resources. He suggests that if the nation must take loans to fund a war effort, it would need strong credit that can only be obtained by demonstrating an ability to collect funds through taxation.

== Analysis ==
Federalist No. 30 presented commerce as a subject of the government's interest because it benefits both the citizen engaging in commerce and the wider community. Hamilton supported the power of the government to levy taxes, and he opposed restricting this power because that would mean it is possible to identify a point where no other worthwhile benefits to the public can be made. Hamilton used Federalist No. 30 to argue that the national government should have more power over the economy because of a need to consistently dedicate funds for the public good and finance national defense.

Hamilton was critical of the Articles of Confederation because they made the national government financially dependent on state governments and prevented it from building the necessary credit to take loans when needed. It was a popular belief at the time that the government's inability to collect sufficient funds was a danger to the nation. Federalist No. 30 reflected Hamilton's belief that war is inevitably a regular occurrence, and he believed that the economy was the deciding factor in victory. Hamilton also foresaw the growth of the United States and argued that a strong national economy would be needed to respond to new issues.

The concerns raised in Federalist No. 12 returned in No. 30. The Federalist Papers had concluded that all sources of revenue must be accessible to the national government and that creditors will consider the nation's ability to repay a loan. Hamilton restated this in No. 30 and argued that taxes must be as high as can be tolerated to serve the public good. Though he considered credit the best way to fund government activity, he qualified this with the idea that credit is only available to nations that are able to reliably collect funds internally through taxation. Hamilton argued that without good credit, a nation would not be able to fund its defense. The United States maintained a balanced budget in its early history with bipartisan support, but the issue of a national debt was polarizing. Hamilton considered a moderate debt to be beneficial if it was used to fund national projects, while Jeffersonians wished to minimize debt and national spending as much as possible.

== Legacy ==
The Federalist Papers continued to analyze taxation until Federalist No. 36. The ability of the federal government to collect taxes and maintain good credit has consistently been a major political issue since the Constitution's ratification. Federalist No. 30 was cited by the Supreme Court justices John Catron in Piqua Bank v. Knoop (1853), Melville Fuller in Pollock v. Farmers' Loan & Trust Co. (1895), Hugo Black in United States v. South-Eastern Underwriters Ass'n (1944), and William J. Brennan Jr. in Michelin Tire Corp. v. Wages (1976).
