= Federalist No. 32 =

Federalist Paper by Alexander Hamilton on taxation

- Alexander Hamilton, author of Federalist No. 32
- Author: Alexander Hamilton
- Original title: The Same Subject Continued: Concerning the General Power of Taxation
- Language: English
- Series: The Federalist
- Publisher: The Independent Journal
- Publication date: January 3, 1788
- Publication place: United States
- Media type: Newspaper
- Preceded by: Federalist No. 31
- Followed by: Federalist No. 33

Federalist No. 32 is an essay by Alexander Hamilton, the thirty-second of The Federalist Papers. It was first published in The Independent Journal on January 2, 1788, under the pseudonym Publius, the name under which all The Federalist papers were published. This is the third of seven essays by Hamilton on the issue of taxation. It is titled "The Same Subject Continued: Concerning the General Power of Taxation".

The Federalist Papers, as a foundation text of constitutional interpretation, are frequently cited by American jurists. Of all the essays, No. 32 is the fifth-most frequently cited.

== Notes ==
1. Ira C. Lupu, "The Most-Cited Federalist Papers." 15 Constitutional Commentary 403-410 (1998)
