= Federalist No. 83 =

Federalist Paper by Alexander Hamilton

- Alexander Hamilton, author of Federalist No. 83
- Author: Alexander Hamilton
- Original title: The Judiciary Continued in Relation to Trial by Jury
- Language: English
- Publisher: The Independent Journal, New York Packet, The Daily Advertiser
- Publication date: July 5, 1788; July 9, 1788; July 12, 1788
- Publication place: United States
- Media type: Newspaper
- Preceded by: Federalist No. 82
- Followed by: Federalist No. 84

Federalist No. 83 is an essay by Alexander Hamilton, the eighty-third of The Federalist Papers. It was published on July 5, 9, and 12, 1788, under the pseudonym Publius, the name under which all The Federalist papers were published. Titled "The Judiciary Continued in Relation to Trial by Jury", it is the last in a series of six essays discussing the powers and limitations of the judicial branch.

Federalist No. 83 was Hamilton's attempt to assuage anxieties about the lack of a constitutional provision for trial by jury in civil cases. Hamilton said the Constitution's silence on the matter was not a cancellation of rights:

The specification of an obligation to try all criminal cases in a particular mode, excludes indeed the obligation or necessity of employing the same mode in civil causes, but does not abridge the power of the legisature to exercise that mode if it should be thought proper. The pretence therefore, that the national legislature would not be at full liberty to submit all the civil causes of federal cognizance to the determination of juries, is a pretence destitute of all just foundation.

Hamilton acknowledges that juries may be corrupted by the selection process. The benefits of trial by jury in civil cases result from "complicated agency" which "discourages" would-be corrupters:

The temptations to prostitution, which the judges might have to surmount, must certainly be much fewer while the co-operation of a jury îs necessary, than they might be if they had themselves the exclusive determination of all cases.

Although Hamilton is not persuaded that jury trials in civil cases are essential to the "preservation of liberty", he recognizes the benefit of jury and court acting as checks on each another. Trial by jury, Hamilton says, "is in most cases, under proper regulations, an excellent method of determining questions of property".

He defended the Convention's decision to not impose a uniform rule on states because of the complexity of state judicial structures. In some States like Pennsylvania and Delaware common law courts had equity jurisdiction. Equity, admiralty and (common) law jurisdictions were blended in Connecticut, New Hampshire and Massachusetts. In New York trial by jury was only available in the common law courts. Hamilton says Virginia and Maryland were most similar to New York.

Later, the Seventh Amendment was added to the Constitution to guarantee a jury trial in common law suits.
