= Federalist No. 49 =

Federalist Paper by James Madison

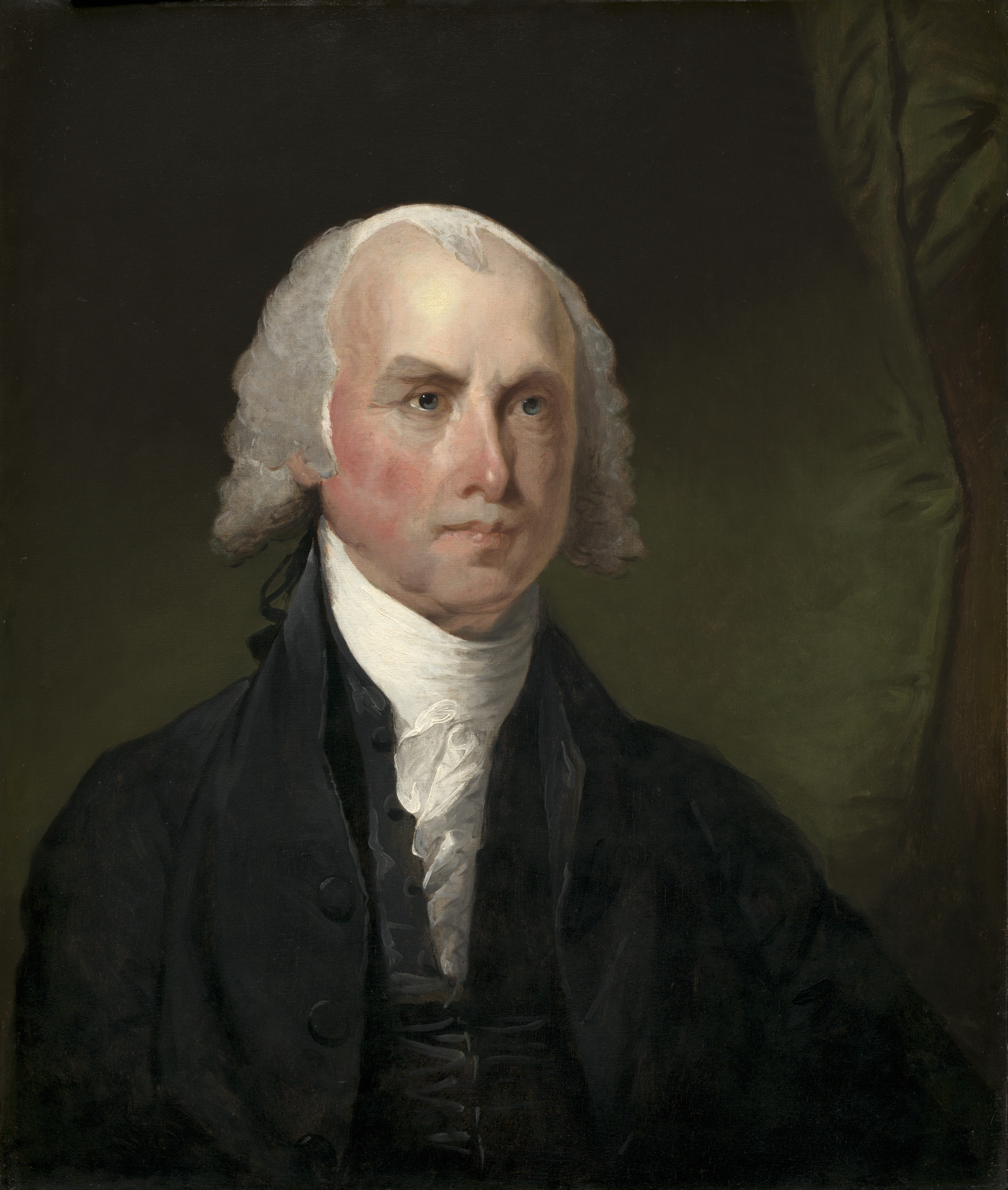
- James Madison, author of Federalist No. 49
- Author: James Madison
- Original title: Method of Guarding Against the Encroachments of Any One Department of Government by Appealing to the People Through a Convention
- Language: English
- Series: The Federalist
- Publisher: New York Packet
- Publication date: February 2, 1788
- Publication place: United States
- Media type: Newspaper
- Preceded by: Federalist No. 48
- Followed by: Federalist No. 50

Federalist No. 49 is an essay by James Madison, the forty-ninth of The Federalist Papers. It was first published by The New York Packet on February 2, 1788, under the pseudonym "Publius", the name under which all The Federalist papers were published. It is titled "Method of Guarding Against the Encroachments of Any One Department of Government by Appealing to the People Through a Convention".

== Summary ==
In this essay, Madison, writing as Publius, confronts directly some of the ideas raised by Thomas Jefferson in his Notes on the State of Virginia. Jefferson's provision in question reads: "whenever any two of the three branches of government shall concur in opinion, each by the voices of two thirds of their whole number, that a convention is necessary for altering the Constitution, or correcting breaches of it, a convention shall be called for the purpose." Madison begins by agreeing that there is logic to the idea of allowing the people to appeal through the use of a convention, but then explains that it would be unworkable and contradictory to the proposed Constitution.

Madison explains that allowing the proposed conventions would allow the "public passions" to disturb the "public tranquility." He explains that it would suggest a "defect" in the actions of the government, one that may erode the government completely. Madison then reminds his audience that it is a moment of public passion that has caused the drafters to write the proposed United States Constitution, and that it would be impractical to provide the opportunity for constant change once it is ratified.

Madison also reasons that providing for a constitutional convention when any two of the three branches concur that one should be held is not as safeguarding as may seem. He notes that the Executive Branch and Judicial Branch of the proposed government are both made of a small number of people, and points out that a small number of people could prompt the need for a convention. Instead, Madison explains, the proposed Constitution provides for a Legislative Branch consisting of many representatives, which can provide a check on the other two branches, and vice versa.

Based on these reasons, Madison concludes that "appeals to the people would be neither a proper nor an effectual provision."

Madison also contended for government transparency, claiming that "road to the decision of the people ought to be marked out and kept open."
