= Federalist No. 13 =

Federalist Paper by Alexander Hamilton

- Alexander Hamilton, author of Federalist No. 13
- Author: Alexander Hamilton
- Original title: Advantage of the Union in Respect to Economy in Government
- Language: English
- Series: The Federalist
- Publisher: The Independent Journal
- Publication date: November 28, 1787
- Publication place: United States
- Media type: Newspaper
- Preceded by: Federalist No. 12
- Followed by: Federalist No. 14

Federalist No. 13 is an essay by Alexander Hamilton, the thirteenth of The Federalist Papers. It was first published in The Independent Journal (New York) on November 28, 1787, under the pseudonym Publius, the name under which all The Federalist papers were published. It is titled "Advantage of the Union in Respect to Economy in Government".

== Summary ==
This essay focuses on the view that a Union would be more economically sound than separate States. Publius explains that, rather than having many separate governments to support, a Union would require only one national government to support. He describes this as being both more simple as well as more economical. The essay further explains that in order to defend themselves, separate States would have to work together, but their support of one another would be disjointed. Only a fully united government would provide the best defense for all the States and be able to support military establishments and necessary civil servants. The paper finishes with a warning for what would happen if the states become broken up: "a separation would be not less injurious to the economy, than to the tranquility, commerce, revenue, and liberty of every part," meaning that a division would hurt many components of America's unity.
