= Federalist No. 64 =

Federalist Paper by John Jay

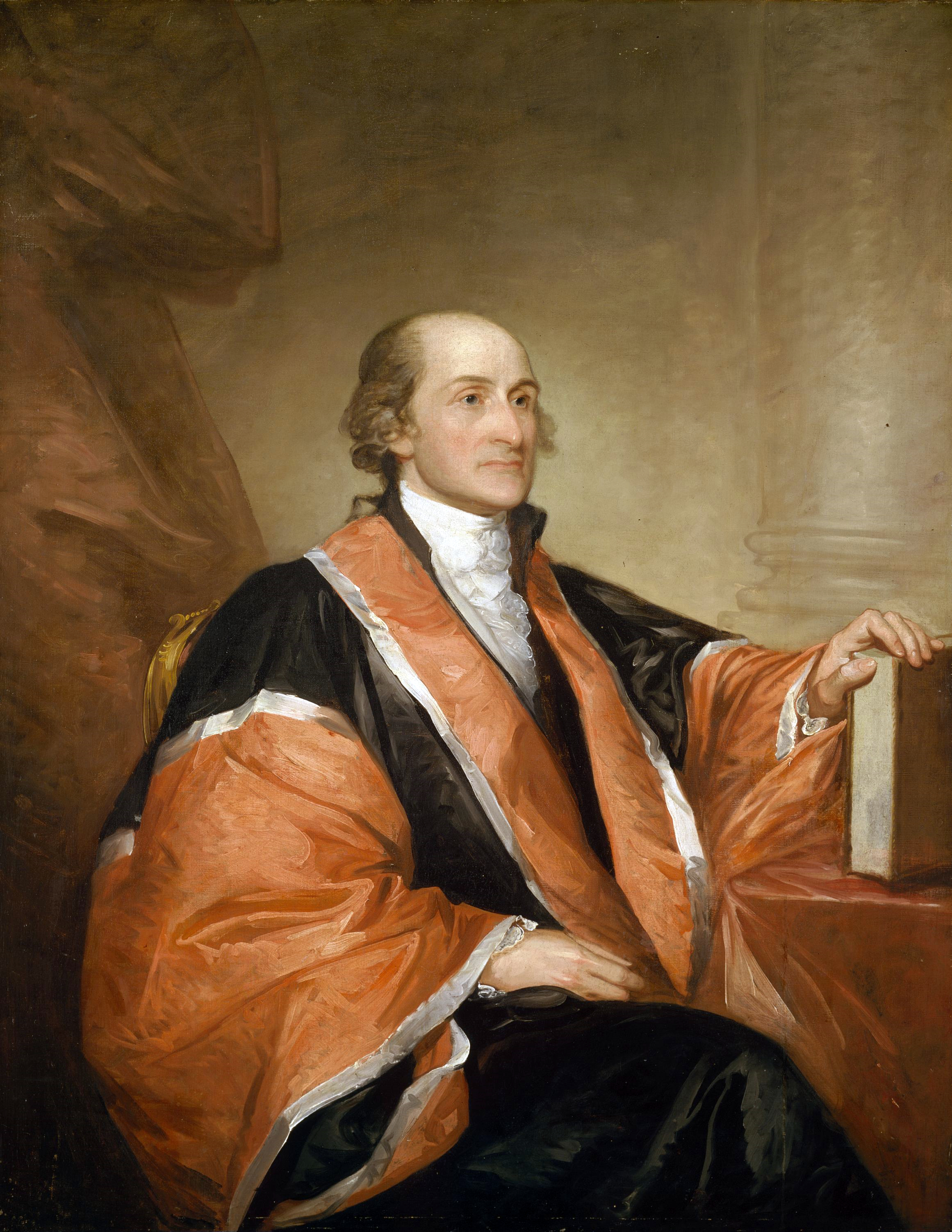
- Portrait of John Jay by Gilbert Stuart. Jay was the author of Federalist No. 64
- Author: John Jay
- Original title: The Power of the Senate
- Language: English
- Series: The Federalist
- Publisher: New York Packet
- Publication date: March 5, 1788
- Publication place: United States
- Media type: Newspaper
- Preceded by: Federalist No. 63
- Followed by: Federalist No. 65

Federalist No. 64, titled "The Power of the Senate", is an essay first published in The New York Packet on March 5, 1788, by John Jay as part of the ongoing Federalist Papers. Throughout the Federalist Papers, James Madison, Alexander Hamilton, and Jay emphasize the particular role in the field of foreign affairs (Golove). However, Federalist No. 64 specifically focuses more deeply on the concept of treaties and how they are formed. This essay in the Federalist Papers is very influential, discussing the idea of treaties, the mystery behind the author, and the invalidity of the Anti-Federalists' argument.

== Summary ==
In Federalist No. 64, Jay defends the provision in the Constitution that grants the President the power to make treaties with the consent of two-thirds of the Senate. The Senate can check presidential power and ensure the states are each given an equal vote in the treaty-making process. He interpreted the Constitution as giving more power to the President through treaties, unlike his other Founding Fathers. They, however, believe that the Senate would gain too much power by doing this. While the "advise and consent" clause was typically understood to give the Senate power to oversee treaty enactment, Jay interpreted the clause as giving the President the power to decide when he wanted to seek "advise and consent" from the body. With this being noted, Jay expresses his stance that the Senate represents the state issues and is less knowledgeable in foreign affairs than the President. This concept also supports Jay's belief that the Constitution creates a strong national government that favors the Senate. While the Senate gets a say in the outcome, they do not have a say in how they are passed. With these concepts in mind, Federalist No. 64 is an influential piece of the Federalist Papers.

== Anti-Federalist argument ==
The Anti-Federalist Papers was written before the Federalist Papers by Founding Fathers opposed to the merits of the proposed United States Constitution. Three papers touch on the aspects of the Senate defended in Federalist 64. Anti-Federalist 62 discusses how the members of the Senate should be chosen and their organization. People believed that if the chosen Senate worked for a long time, they would begin only to make decisions for themselves, stating specifically, "The term for which the senate are to be chosen, is in my judgment too long, and no provision being made for a rotation will, I conceive, be of dangerous consequence". Anti-Federalist paper 63 states opinions on the number of people in the Senate and possible problems. The writer agrees that the Senate taking part will be beneficial but thinks that it will eventually become "the source of the greatest evils". Finally, Anti-Federalist 64 speaks about the beliefs that the constitution of the Senate sends fear and little hope to the democratic rights. "[It] will swallow up the democratic rights and liberties of the nation...that we have much to fear from it, and little to hope, and then it must necessarily produce a baneful aristocracy, by which the democratic rights of the people will be overwhelmed".

== Influence over time ==
Initially, there was not much controversy over the power between the Senate and President in treaty making. Still, the Senate had many differences because of different political views. Multiple arguments were submitted to the Senate between 1789 and 1815, and there were no rejections. Over time, the checks and balances between the President and Senate have affected the country's ability to make treaties in the best interest of the country successfully. Getting two-thirds of the Senate's approval became a hard process. It seemed more effective for the President to make executive agreements than to negotiate more formal treaties leading to a preference of successive administrations to make executive agreements. The President can act alone and make an executive agreement in relation to foreign policy without the approval of Congress. Over time, there has been a significant increase in executive agreements and a decrease in treaty-making. 1937 was the last year that more treaties were made than executive agreements. Between 1789 and 1839, the US State Department reported 60 treaties and 27 executive agreements; still, by the 20th century, presidents including McKinley, Taft, and Theodore Roosevelt began using more executive agreements on critical foreign situations. Between the presidencies of Roosevelt (1901–1909) and Bush (2001–2005), the use of executive agreements significantly increased, indicating that presidents would rather avoid political differences with the Senate and make foreign policy decisions without discussing a possible treaty with the Senate. One-third of the treaties discussed during the presidencies of Roosevelt and Bush were in the Senate's power. During President Obama's first three years of office, he used many more executive agreements than treaties. To avoid controversy due to politics, President Obama made many executive decisions, including "the use of American military power and solutions to global problems, including nuclear proliferation, a global financial crisis, and climate change".

== Publication history ==
The identity of the author of Federalist paper No. 64 was long disputed. The exact reason why the authorship was lost is unknown; however, different theories emerged as to why the authorship was not evident. The first and most likely of the theories is that John Jay became ill, and No. 64 was not published at the same time as the other Federalist Papers. The second theory is that Jay asked Hamilton and Madison to hide his involvement in the Federalist Papers because his writing was not strong enough; however, this information came from an unidentified source. This theory is supported by the fact that Madison changed the list of authors that Hamilton wrote up. The author was finally confirmed to be John Jay when his descendant of the same name found the original draft of Federalist No. 64, along with multiple The Independent Journal newspapers. Many of the Federalist Papers were published in The Independent Journal. The original draft of No. 64 is one of the two initial drafts of the Federalist Papers. Only four of the Federalist Papers still exist, and all four are in John Jay's hand.
