= Federalist No. 77 =

Federalist Paper by Alexander Hamilton

- Alexander Hamilton, author of Federalist No. 77
- Author: Alexander Hamilton
- Original title: The Appointing Power Continued and Other Powers of the Executive Considered
- Language: English
- Publisher: The Independent Journal, New York Packet, The Daily Advertiser
- Publication date: April 2, 1788
- Publication place: United States
- Media type: Newspaper
- Preceded by: Federalist No. 76
- Followed by: Federalist No. 78

Federalist No. 77 is an essay by Alexander Hamilton, the seventy-seventh of The Federalist Papers. It was published on April 2, 1788, under the pseudonym Publius, the name under which all The Federalist papers were published. The title is "The Appointing Power Continued and Other Powers of the Executive Considered", and it is the last in a series of 11 essays discussing the powers and limitations of the Executive Branch.

In this paper, Hamilton discusses the power of the Senate to approve a president's appointments, the Executive's ability to call Congress together to give the State of the Union, and shares his concluding thoughts on the president's powers discussed throughout all of the Federalist Papers’ previous commentary.

== Summary ==
Hamilton opens by acknowledging the counterarguments that oppose the "Union of the Senate with the President," established by both branches of government playing a role in the nomination process. He writes that some say it would result in the president having "undue influence" over the Senate and that others say it would have the opposite tendency. In response, Hamilton argues that the idea that this provision would create presidential power over the Senate when the concept of a confirmation process is actually restraining executive power is "an absurdity in terms." To argue against the idea that requiring Senate confirmation is problematic because it will give the Senate influence over the president, he argues that the power of influence equates "conferring a benefit" and since the "power of nomination is unequivocally vested in the Executive" and the Senate can only "obstruct their course," the Senate cannot confer a benefit from the Executive. Thus, Hamilton reasons that the Senate does not have influence over the president.

When advocating for the nomination process outlined in the Constitution, Hamilton argues that having a Senate confirmation process would turn presidential appointments into "matters of notoriety" and that the public "would be at no loss" to form opinions on the nominees compared to the traditional "shut up" small group that appointed positions at the State level during his time. By doing this, Hamilton chose to criticize his own state of New York's method and makes the point of how a public, large scale process would increase accountability for both the president and the Senate compared to the current norm. He also adds that it is far easier to manipulate a small group than a big group like the Senate. Again, he juxtaposes what is outlined in the Constitution with New York's appointment process at the time, which was that 3-5 men, including the governor, would make these decisions behind closed doors.

Hamilton moves on from discussion of Senate confirmations to defend the Executive's constitutional power to give information to Congress on the State of the Union. He acknowledges that those who criticize the extent of this power only question the president's ability to convene each branch separately. Hamilton argues that since the Executive branch has "concurrent power" with the Senate, and only the Senate, to form treaties that it would be "unnecessary and improper" to convene the House of Representatives as well.
