= Federalist No. 31 =

Federalist Paper by Alexander Hamilton

- Alexander Hamilton, author of Federalist No. 31
- Author: Alexander Hamilton
- Original title: The Same Subject Continued: Concerning the General Power of Taxation
- Language: English
- Series: The Federalist
- Publisher: New York Packet
- Publication date: January 1, 1788
- Publication place: United States
- Media type: Newspaper
- Preceded by: Federalist No. 30
- Followed by: Federalist No. 32

Federalist No. 31 is an essay by Alexander Hamilton, the thirty-first of The Federalist Papers. It was first published in The New York Packet on January 1, 1788, under the pseudonym Publius, the name under which all The Federalist papers were published. This is the second of seven essays by Hamilton on the controversial issue of taxation. It is titled "The Same Subject Continued: Concerning the General Power of Taxation".

== Brief Precis ==
Hamilton argues that a government must possess all the powers necessary for achieving its objectives. It must have the means to secure an end. One of these means is the power of taxation. Hamilton argues that the great body of representatives will seek to prevent abuse of this power and usurpation of the state governments' abilities to collect taxes.
