= Federalist No. 33 =

Federalist Paper promoting a Supremacy Clause

- Alexander Hamilton, author of Federalist No. 33
- Author: Alexander Hamilton
- Original title: The Same Subject Continued: Concerning the General Power of Taxation
- Language: English
- Series: The Federalist
- Publisher: The Independent Journal
- Publication date: January 2, 1788
- Publication place: United States
- Media type: Newspaper
- Preceded by: Federalist No. 32
- Followed by: Federalist No. 34

Federalist No. 33, written by Alexander Hamilton and first published in The Independent Journal on January 2, 1788, continues the focus on the issues in creating an efficient taxation system, along with reassuring the people's doubts about the government control over taxation. Titled "The Same Subject Continued: Concerning the General Power of Taxation", No. 33 explores the idea of allowing Congress to make all laws that are necessary for efficiently operating the national government. Under the pseudonym, Publius, John Jay, Hamilton, and James Madison collectively wrote and published eighty-five essays in the New York newspaper between 1787 and 1788 (later published as a book called The Federalist Papers in 1788) to promote the ratification of the United States Constitution.

== Controversies ==
Hamilton notes that the Necessary and Proper Clause and the Supremacy Clause "have been the source of much virulent invective and petulant declamation against the proposed Constitution." This stirs up much of the issues amongst the people due to the uncertainty of the consequences of granting the government "too much power". He argues that the first clause is implicit in the constitution—if congress is granted a power, it must necessarily be able to draft laws that enable it to execute that power. Hamilton then applies this line of logic to the issue of taxation, stating that Congress must have the power to create legislation to collect taxes. The people's reluctance is understandable, considering their recent break from Great Britain. Hamilton ridicules the anti-federalist alarmism about giving the national government more power, writing that the national government has "been held up to the people in all the exaggerated colors of misrepresentation as the pernicious engines by which their local governments were to be destroyed and their liberties exterminated; as the hideous monster whose devouring jaws would spare neither sex nor age, nor high nor low, nor sacred nor profane…" This quote expresses Hamilton's frustration for the people's inability to hear him out and truly understand the reasoning and importance for the two clauses because these legislations and clauses are stated specifically to avoid anyone from being able to nitpick and find loopholes, and without anyone enforcing it, it would just be a treaty.

He poses the question of why the clause should be included if its power is implicit. He answers by saying that the clause is included "to guard against all cavilling refinements in those who might hereafter feel the disposition to curtail and evade the legitimate authorities of the Union," in other words, to guard against those who would seek to evade the authority of the Union by an overly literal interpretation of the constitution. In his essay he states that "'to make all laws which shall be necessary and proper for carrying into execution the powers by that Constitution vested in the government of the United States...and the treaties made by their authority shall be the supreme law of the land, anything in the constitution or laws of any State to the contrary notwithstanding.'" Hamilton proceeds to clarify and explain the clause and the purpose it serves in detail in order to assuage all conflict and fear.

His response to a potential abuse of these powers is that the government must be responsible for the proper exercise of its powers, but ultimately the people themselves must hold the government to account. "If the federal government should overpass the just bounds of its authority and make a tyrannical use of its powers, the people, whose creature it is, must appeal to the standard they have formed, and take such measures to redress the injury done to the Constitution as the exigency may suggest and prudence justify."

Hamilton similarly argues that the Supremacy Clause is simply an assurance that the government's powers can be properly executed, saying that a law itself implies supremacy, and without supremacy, it would amount to nothing. He returns to the example of taxation, stating that the supremacy of the constitution as the law of the land did not preclude states from independently raising their own taxes as necessary, except for duties on imports and exports. Hamilton's intentions were to assuage any uncertainty, hesitancy or fear amongst the people. He does so by explicitly going over the main purpose of the two controversial clauses. He makes sure that the audience understands that this will not take away their liberty, but instead will strengthen the ability of the government to effectively eliminate any issues presented in the future.

Hamilton concludes by saying that this concurrent jurisdiction in the realm of taxation was the only acceptable substitute to complete federal control, an idea he expounds upon in Federalist No. 34.

== See also ==
- Article Six of the United States Constitution
  - Supremacy Clause
