= Federalist No. 67 =

Federalist Paper by Alexander Hamilton about the Executive Department

- Alexander Hamilton, author of Federalist No. 67
- Author: Alexander Hamilton
- Original title: The Executive Department
- Language: English
- Publisher: The New York Packet
- Publication date: March 11, 1788
- Publication place: United States
- Media type: Newspaper
- Preceded by: Federalist No. 66
- Followed by: Federalist No. 68

Federalist No. 67 is an essay by Alexander Hamilton, the sixty-seventh of The Federalist Papers. This essay's title is "The Executive Department" and begins a series of eleven separate papers discussing the powers and limitations of that branch. Federalist No. 67 was published under the pseudonym Publius, like the rest of the Federalist Papers. It was published in the New York Packet on Tuesday, March 11, 1788.

In this paper, Hamilton distinguishes between the president's constitutionally limited executive powers and the far more extensive powers of a monarch as a ruler. He also chastises opponents of the Constitution who claim the U.S. President is granted excessive power by being allowed to fill vacancies in the U.S. Senate. Hamilton points out that this is a misreading, as the President's power applies to vacancies of executive officers, which does not include the Senate.

== Anti-Federalist criticisms ==
Hamilton's arguments are a response to anti-federalist arguments against the new constitution and the strong general government that it implied. The anti-federalists feared that the national government would weaken their states and that national debts would burden the country, and were particularly concerned with the executive branch, arguing that it would eventually become a monarchy or dictatorship. People questioned why Hamilton and the Federalists would propose a constitution that created an executive branch that seemed to have too much power. America was coming off the revolution where they fought England to gain independence from an oppressive government they believed had too much power. People were concerned that this new executive branch would destroy the freedom that they had just fought and died for. Another major fear was that the executive would have too much say in the Senate. They thought the executive would be controlling from behind the scenes and appointing whoever they wanted to Congress. Hamilton set out to prove that these fears were something not to worry about because the executive branch would be tightly regulated.

== Hamilton's arguments ==
=== Executive branch ===
To refute the notion that the executive branch would become a monarchy, allowing the President to put a person in any office, Hamilton wrote, "To nominate, and by and with the advice and consent of the Senate, to appoint ambassadors, other public ministers and consuls, judges of the Supreme Court, and all other officers of United States whose appointments are not in the Constitution otherwise provided for, and which shall be established by law." What this statement means is that the President of the United States can only nominate members as ambassadors, public ministries and consuls, Supreme Court judges, and any other member that is not directly named in the Constitution currently or that will be named in the future without first consulting the Senate and then getting the Senate's approval of his nomination.

=== Recess appointments ===
In a case where the President would have nominated a person to an office mentioned above, Hamilton creates a measure to ensure the President's choice will not be able to stay in the office unless agreed upon by the Senate when he writes, "The President shall have power to fill up all vacancies that may happen during the recess of the Senate, by granting commissions which shall expire at the end of their next session." This sentence states that during an instance when the Senate has recessed, and a vacancy occurs, the President can fill this vacancy without consulting the Senate, but as soon as the recess is over, the vacancy that was filled will be considered and possibly changed at the Senate's will.

== Modern interpretations ==
=== Divided government ===
Two major political parties can hold the executive branch: the Democrats and the Republicans. The elections that occur every four years, unequal representation within Congress, and differing opinions make it difficult to find a balance among the Executives. Each new term brings in new faces with new ideas and backgrounds. This rapid exchange of power often leads to a president who tries to do too much in too little time, forcing a president to be the main problem solver despite having Congress for guidance or intellectual support. This contributes to the sense that the president may hold too much power like a forceful dictator.

=== "Most dangerous branch" ===
Despite the uncertainty of Hamilton's original message, the executive branch has played a significant role in the United States since its genesis. The executive has become known as the "most dangerous" branch of government because it is the main decision-maker regarding all national policies and ideas. The legislative and judiciary branches assist in those decisions, but the president – along with Congress – makes the final judgments. To the public, the power seems to remain within the Executives, which goes against what Hamilton originally addressed in Federalist 67, but it also shows the division of branches and their capability.

=== Power of president ===
Alexander Hamilton's plea against becoming a dictatorship still raises questions today. Tom Howard of Harding University believes that presidential powers have increased at an alarming rate since the 20th century. He said, "The most significant change in the entire history of the American political system has been the growth of the President's powers." A contributing factor to the overabundance of power that the president holds is the concept of having a one-person office. The main power within the executive branch is very lightly distributed to the additional 535 members of Congress.

=== Fixed terms ===
Unless the President commits an impeachable offense or dies, they are present in the White House for the entirety of the four years. Several American citizens are challenging the standards; they are fighting for a way to enable the United States to re-elect presidents when necessary – maybe after two years. Research has shown that almost half of the support for presidents typically dies down after the first half of the term. On the contrary, others argue that a single six-year term would benefit the country as whole. Without the pressure of campaigning for reelection, having a longer term would allow the President to focus on national and global issues strictly. These two perspectives provide alternatives to the US Constitution's original plan for the executive branch that Hamilton backed in Federalist 67.
