= Federalist No. 50 =

Federalist Paper by James Madison on Periodic Appeals to the People

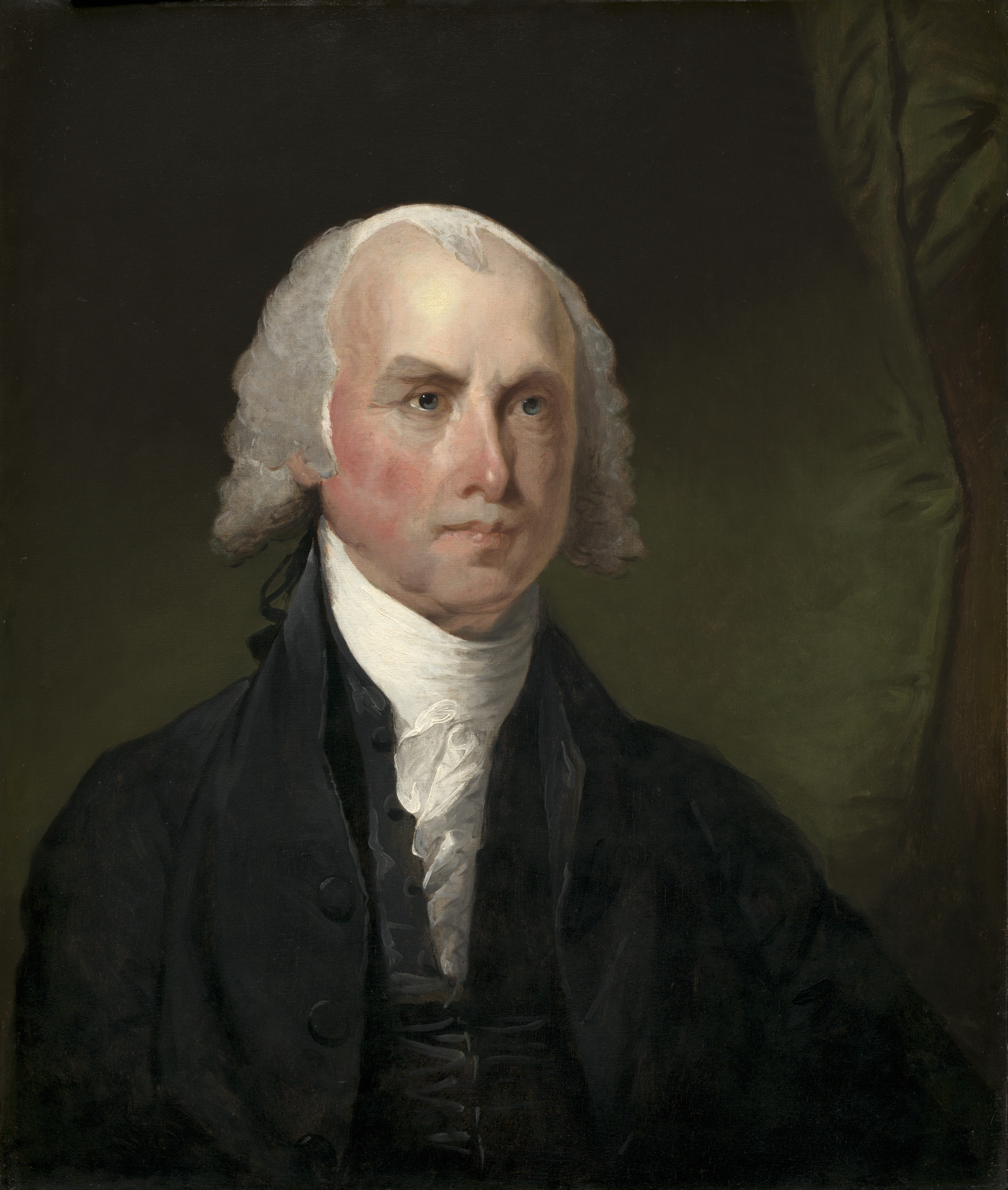
- James Madison, disputed author of Federalist No. 50
- Author: James Madison or Alexander Hamilton
- Original title: Periodic Appeals to the People Considered
- Language: English
- Series: The Federalist
- Publisher: New York Packet
- Publication date: February 5, 1788
- Publication place: United States
- Media type: Newspaper
- Preceded by: Federalist No. 49
- Followed by: Federalist No. 51

Federalist No. 50 is the fiftieth essay of The Federalist Papers. The authorship of the work is disputed between James Madison and Alexander Hamilton. It was first published in The New York Packet on February 5, 1788, under the pseudonym Publius, the name under which all The Federalist papers were published. It is titled "Periodic Appeals to the People Considered".

== Summary ==
Federalist No. 50 further examines the proper means of "PREVENTING AND CORRECTING INFRACTIONS OF THE CONSTITUTION." Whereas No. 49 refutes arguments for occasional appeals of the people, No. 50 argues against a second alternative: periodic appeals of the people, occurring with a higher frequency. With this latter system, the author claims, the judgement of people to remedy infringements on the constitution would be clouded by a passion and zeal rooted in its recency, ultimately leading to a failure to reach a solution. The author propounds an example from the Pennsylvania legislature, where legislators acting as intermediaries to enforce checks and balances, were biased and thus ineffective.
