= Federalist No. 76 =

Federalist Paper by Alexander Hamilton

- Alexander Hamilton, author of Federalist No. 76
- Author: Alexander Hamilton
- Original title: The Appointing Power of the Executive
- Language: English
- Publisher: The Independent Journal, New York Packet, The Daily Advertiser
- Publication date: April 1, 1788
- Publication place: United States
- Media type: Newspaper
- Preceded by: Federalist No. 75
- Followed by: Federalist No. 77

Federalist No. 76, written by Alexander Hamilton, was published on April 1, 1788. The Federalist Papers are a series of eighty-five essays written to urge the ratification of the United States Constitution. These letters were written by Alexander Hamilton, James Madison, and John Jay under the name of Publius in the late 1780s. This paper discusses the arrangement of the power of appointment and the system of checks and balances. The title is "The Appointing Power of the Executive", and is the tenth in a series of 11 essays discussing the powers and limitations of the Executive branch. There are three options for entrusting power: a single individual, a select congregation, or an individual with the unanimity of the assembly. Hamilton supported bestowing the president with the nominating power but the ratifying power would be granted to the senate in order to have a process with the least bias.

== Purpose ==
The President is to appoint ambassadors, other public ministers and consuls, judges of the Supreme Court, and all other officers of the United States. Alongside the President when making these decisions is the Senate who is to give consent to such choices. "Appointments could be made in three ways, by a single person, by a select assembly of moderate number, or by a single man with concurrence of the assembly." By law, the Congress may vest the appointment of such inferior officers as they think proper in the President alone, or in the courts of law, or even in the heads of departments.

== Background ==
Hamilton saw that an appointing power of an executive was a huge decision not only for the Senate but for the entirety of the United States. Hamilton saw that without this article the United States could fall back into what they had just gotten out of, a tyranny. A President with absolute appointing power would be too similar to when the King of England had control over the United States. However, having it vice versa with the President having less appointing power than the Senate, would cause more arguments than needed to run a smoothly operating government. Hamilton's conclusion was based on his two ideas. The President can appoint a qualified person to the Senate and it is up to the Senate to see if they are the right nomination or not.

== The Constitution ==
Ratified in 1781, the Articles of Confederation originally depicted the nation's government when it was a confederation of states. Under the Articles of Confederation, the Congress of the Confederation was the legislature that had overarching power and authority, including that of appointments.

In 1787, at the Philadelphia Convention, a proposal for a new system of government was constructed. Rather than having a single authoritative and dominating body, the delegates devised a plan for three branches of government: executive, legislative, and judicial. Not only this, but the system of checks and balances was also created in order to prevent unequal power amongst branches. The new structure of government was a key ideal written in the Constitution of the United States, signed on September 17, 1787 by delegates of the Continental Congress.

In regards to Federalist Paper 76, the essay discusses the arrangement of the power of appointment and the distribution of power. Hamilton wrote Federalist 76 in support of the proposals from the US Constitutional Convention.

== Summary ==
Publius begins this essay by quoting the Appointments Clause of the proposed United States Constitution. Publius then states that "it is not easy to conceive a plan better calculated than this" and explains why he believes that is so. He explains that the power of appointment can only be allocated in one of three ways: vested in a single man, in a "select assembly of a moderate number," or in a single man with concurrence by an assembly.

First, he explains that such power vested in a single man would make him sway to personal inclinations and attachments. Thus, this was not the best option. Second, he explains that power vested in an assembly would make the group prone to compromise, where one's personal inclination for one appointment would lead him to compromise on another in the hope that others will do the same for his. Again, this would not work very well.

The only possible option left was to place the Appointment power with the President, by and with the consent of the Senate. According to Publius, this arrangement would ensure that the nominated candidate's qualifications were taken into account by the Senate and fully considered before the appointment was completed.

Publius concludes by explaining that the Constitution was written to provide important safeguards to ensure against tyranny.

== Modern Analysis and Reaction ==
Hamilton believed it is the right of the President to nominate, and with the advice and consent of the Senate to appoint. History has put Hamilton's idea in dispute. Even during Washington's presidency, the Senate rejected the President's nominee not because he lacked the necessary qualifications but because they preferred a different candidate. Supreme Court nominations have long been widely accepted as a Presidential right, but the role of the Senate to give advice and consent has been inoperative. Almost every president has been able to appoint whom they've nominated; some commentators view this as mere confirmation rather than "consent." though others may contend that this is in part due to presidents negotiating and verifying whether they have support for a nominee and would not usually nominate someone without enough support to be approved.
