= Federalist No. 80 =

Federalist Paper by Alexander Hamilton

- Alexander Hamilton, author of Federalist No. 80
- Author: Alexander Hamilton
- Original title: The Powers of the Judiciary
- Language: English
- Publisher: J. & A. McLean; The Independent Journal, New York Packet, The Daily Advertiser
- Publication date: May 28, 1788; June 21, 1788
- Publication place: United States
- Media type: Book, Newspaper
- Preceded by: Federalist No. 79
- Followed by: Federalist No. 81

Federalist No. 80 is an essay by Alexander Hamilton, the eightieth of The Federalist Papers. It was published on June 21, 1788 under the pseudonym Publius, the name under which all The Federalist papers were published. It is titled "The Powers of the Judiciary", and it is the third in a series of six essays discussing the powers and limitations of the judicial branch.

== Summary ==
Publius begins this essay by describing five areas that the federal judiciary ought to have jurisdiction over: first, cases which arise out of the laws of the United States; second, cases which arise out of provisions of the proposed United States Constitution; third, cases in which the United States is a party; fourth, all cases that involve "the peace of the confederacy"; and fifth, all cases that originate on the high seas. He then addresses each of these points in turn. Federalist No. 80, the "Powers of the Judiciary", published on June 21, 1788, explains the powers and limitations of the judicial branch of the United States government. Alexander Hamilton offers five specific principles or situations in which the judiciary should have jurisdiction to overrule state laws and explains why the federal court should hold such responsibilities.

As to the first set of cases, Publius explains that in a Union, there will necessarily be certain things that the states are prohibited from doing, such as the prohibition on coining money. Given this, he states that there must be some way for the federal government to enforce these prohibitions, and so it must be the authority of federal courts to overrule improper action by the states. As he puts it, "the States, by the plan of the convention, are prohibited from doing a variety of things, some of which are incompatible with the interests of the Union, and others with the principles of good government." In other words, the interests of the whole nation require certain limits on the states. Hamilton offers the example of coining money, which was forbidden to the states but was done anyway. The only logical way to prevent such violations was to allow federal courts to hear such cases, since state courts would presumably rule in favor of their own state.[1]

As to the second set of cases, Publius posits that there can be no argument against this power of the federal judiciary. The necessity of uniform laws, and the status of the judiciary as equal to the legislative branch and the executive branch, requires that the judiciary hear cases involving the text of the Constitution. Hamilton's second principle states that, where federal laws are concerned, the federal court should have jurisdiction to maintain uniformity in the interpretation of national laws. If thirteen independent courts had the final say over the same laws, there would be no national laws, only state laws.[2]

Publius says very little about the third set of cases. He mentions only that a national forum is the only one proper to hear cases between a citizen and the United States. The overall main focus of this third set of cases emphasizes that only a national forum is the proper to hear cases between a citizen and the United States. Any conflict between the nation and a citizen can and will be resolved, only through the Federal Court. "Still less need be said in regard to the third point. Controversies between the nation and its members or citizens, can only be properly referred to the national tribunals. Any other plan would be contrary to reason, to precedent, and to decorum." The third is the shortest of the principles and the most straightforward. Furthermore, this leads us into the fourth case.

As to the fourth set of cases, Publius explains that this relies on the proposition that "the peace of the whole ought not to be left at the disposal of the part." He further explains that undoubtedly there will be cases involving citizens of foreign countries, and only the federal judiciary can adjudicate those cases to reflect the national perspective, unlike the states that would decide such cases in their own best interest rather than that of the Union. Within this same jurisdictional power is that to hear cases involving citizens of different states, as well as territorial disputes. Along the same reasoning, the federal judiciary is the only forum that can be expected to decide such cases with neutrality and uniformity, since the State courts would likely decide in favor of their own citizens and their own interests. This principle simply emphasizes that as a whole, the country should not be taken to blame for one part of it: you as a citizen are responsible for actions in and out of the country and will be handled by the federal court if a problem arises. Hamilton explains that this point is important when dealing with problems between two states and/or countries.

As to the fifth set of cases, Publius explains that maritime disputes are also relevant to the "public peace" and must be decided by the federal judiciary. Maritime disputes should also be under the jurisdiction of the federal court. The federal court should hold much jurisdiction over the maritime cases because they involve other countries laws. Maritime disputes are generally known as lawsuit cases that appear after the action of passengers injured or actions against employers that fail to use reasonable care towards others that take place near or on the water. Knowing this, the importance for most maritime (sea-related) cases to be in the hands of the federal court is developed

Having concluded this summary, Publius begins explaining the neutrality and impartiality that will be afforded by a federal judiciary. He explains that the states cannot be expected to be unbiased, but that the proposed Constitution must take this into account to ensure fairness and equality among the states.

Publius then moves to explain the differences between "law" and "equity", and how those concepts have been reflected in the language of the proposed Constitution with the word "cases" to mean arising from law and the word "controversies" to mean arising from equity. He then quotes the proposed Constitution to explain which areas are to be cases and which are to be controversies, such as cases involving treaties and maritime disputes, but controversies involving disputes between two states.

Publius concludes the essay with the affirmation that the drafters of the proposed United States Constitution have attempted to safeguard against all "mischiefs", but if those do arise in the judicial branch, there are checks in place to maintain order and to insure against impropriety.
