= Federalist No. 82 =

Federalist Paper by Alexander Hamilton

- Alexander Hamilton, author of Federalist No. 82
- Author: Alexander Hamilton
- Original title: The Judiciary Continued
- Language: English
- Publisher: The Independent Journal, New York Packet, The Daily Advertiser
- Publication date: July 2, 1788
- Publication place: United States
- Media type: Newspaper
- Preceded by: Federalist No. 81
- Followed by: Federalist No. 83

Federalist No. 82 is an essay by Alexander Hamilton, the eighty-second of The Federalist Papers. It was published on July 2, 1788, under the pseudonym Publius, the name under which all The Federalist papers were published. Its title is "The Judiciary Continued", and it is the fifth in a series of six essays discussing the powers and limitations of the judicial branch of government.

The essay focuses on explaining the breadth of jurisdiction between the state and Supreme Courts. Hamilton repeatedly assures his readers that state courts will not lose any pre-constitutional authority except on specific appeals. He also defends the section of the constitution that gives the Supreme Court automatic jurisdiction over cases where a state is an involved party.
