= Federalist No. 48 =

Federalist Paper by James Madison

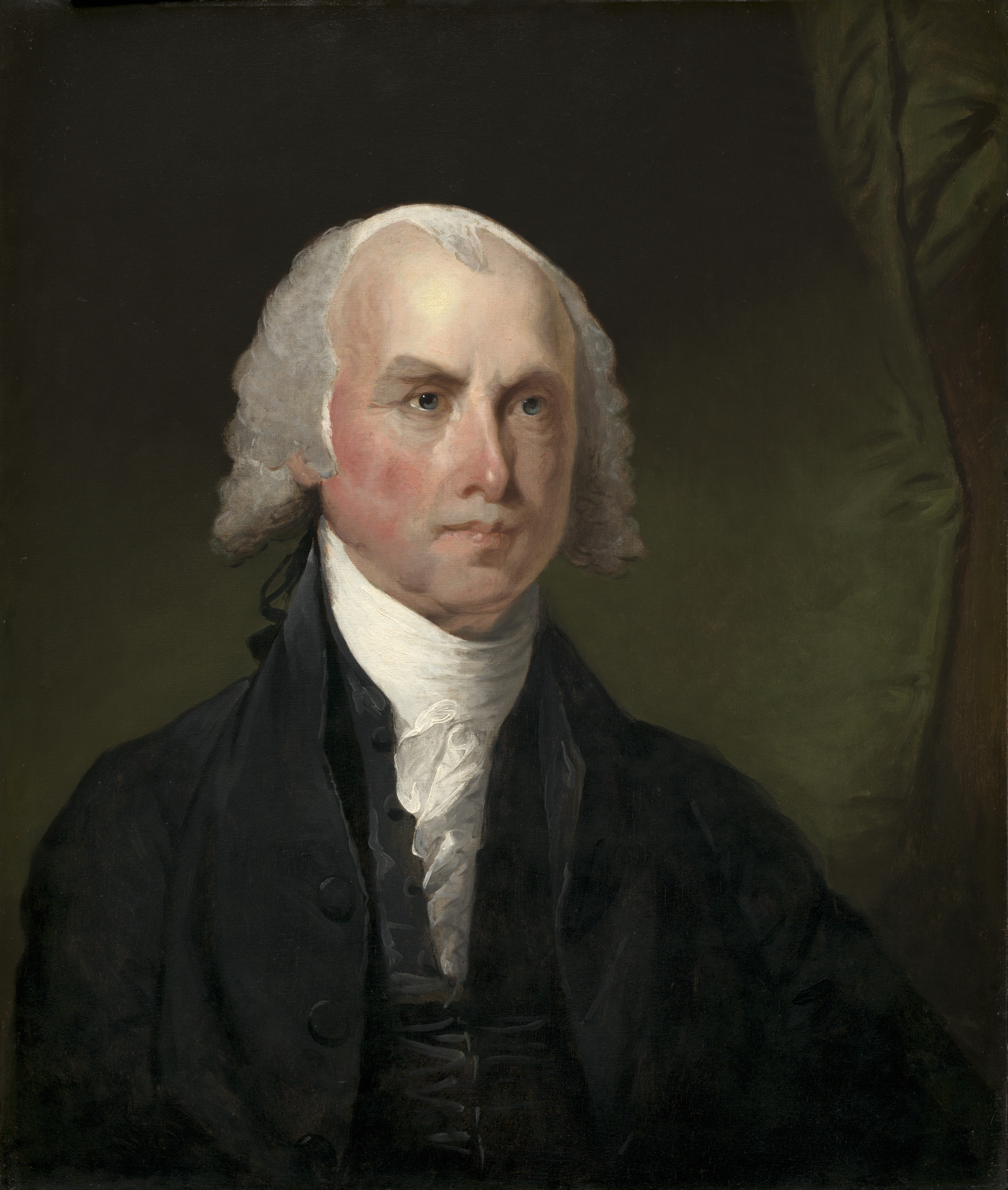
- James Madison, author of Federalist No. 48
- Author: James Madison
- Original title: These Departments Should Not Be So Far Separated as to Have No Constitutional Control Over Each Other
- Language: English
- Series: The Federalist
- Publisher: New York Packet
- Publication date: February 1, 1788
- Publication place: United States
- Media type: Newspaper
- Preceded by: Federalist No. 47
- Followed by: Federalist No. 49

Federalist No. 48 is an essay by James Madison, the forty-eighth of the Federalist Papers. It was first published by The New York Packet on February 1, 1788, under the pseudonym Publius, the name under which all the Federalist Papers were published. This paper builds on Federalist No. 47. In that essay Madison argued for separation of powers; here he argues that the legislative, executive, and judicial branches of government must not be totally divided. It is titled "These Departments Should Not Be So Far Separated as to Have No Constitutional Control Over Each Other".

== Summary ==
Federalist No. 48 argued that the branches of government can be connected, while remaining "separate and distinct". The argument of No. 48 is that, in order to practically maintain the branches as "separate and distinct", they must have "a constitutional control" over each other.

The paper begins by asserting that "power is of an encroaching nature", i.e. those with power will attempt to control everything they can. It then asks how this tendency can be stopped, in order to preserve the "separate and distinct" quality of the branches of government. It then makes the claim that merely defining the boundaries of the branches is an insufficient safeguard. It singles out the legislative branch as being particularly successful in taking over power.

As an aside from the main argument, the paper notes that the danger of the legislative branch taking over has not been thought about by the "founders of our republics", i.e. the people who wrote the thirteen state constitutions.

The paper offers a number of reasons why legislative over-reaching is more likely in a "representative republic", as distinct from other types of government. These reasons include the claim that the legislature is "sufficiently numerous to feel all the passions which actuate a multitude, yet not so numerous as to be incapable of pursuing the objects of its passions" and that its powers are both "more extensive, and less susceptible of precise limits".

Then two examples of legislative over-reaching are given: Virginia and Pennsylvania.

The Virginia example is primarily a long quote from Thomas Jefferson's Notes on the State of Virginia, in which he corroborates the claims of the paper, explaining, for example, that "an elective despotism was not the government we fought for; but one which should not only be founded on free principles, but in which the powers of government should be so divided and balanced among several bodies of magistracy as that no one could transcend their legal limits without being effectually checked and restrained by the others."

In respect of Pennsylvania, the paper summarizes the conclusions of a report by a "Council of Censors" on apparent violations of the Pennsylvania constitution; it found many. A small rebuttal is made to the claim in the report that many violations were committed by the executive branch, not only the legislative branch.
