= Federalist No. 51 =

Federalist Paper by James Madison

- Author: James Madison or Alexander Hamilton
- Original title: The Structure of the Government Must Furnish the Proper Checks and Balances Between the Different Departments
- Language: English
- Series: The Federalist
- Publisher: The New York Independent Journal
- Publication date: February 6, 1788
- Publication place: United States
- Media type: Newspaper
- Preceded by: Federalist No. 50
- Followed by: Federalist No. 52

Federalist No. 51, titled: "The Structure of the Government Must Furnish the Proper Checks and Balances Between the Different Departments", is an essay written by James Madison or Alexander Hamilton, the fifty-first of The Federalist Papers. This document was first published by The New York Independent Journal on February 6, 1788, under the pseudonym Publius, the name under which all The Federalist papers were published. Federalist No. 51 addresses the separation of powers, the federal structure of government and the maintenance of checks and balances by "opposite and rival interests" within the national government. One of Federalist No. 51's most important ideas, an explanation of checks and balances, is the often-quoted phrase, "Ambition must be made to counteract ambition."

Madison's idea was that the politicians and the individuals in public service in the U.S. would all have proclamations and ideas that they were passionate about and that they wanted to enact. The logical solution to ensure that laws and strong ideas were not enacted by a small group of partisan individuals was to use a federalist system where each level of government had different branches, each branch having the authority to impact legislation proposed by other branches. One of the main ways that Federalist 51 was able to encourage checks and balances was by emphasizing that justice was the end to which civil society aims. He continued that it be pursued "until it be obtained, or until liberty be lost in the pursuit". In a "state of nature", Madison says, echoing such thinkers as Hobbes, "the weaker individual is not secured against the violence of the stronger".

Furthermore, Madison emphasized that although the branches were meant to have checks and balances, the branches would only function to their fullest extent if they were independent of one another. By being independent of one another, the branches would be able to focus on their purpose and the system of checks and balances would only really come into play if disagreements and issues arose within the three branches.

The "if men were angels" quote was meant to imply that not everyone has communal interests in mind and that certain government officials are inevitably going to push legislation that is in their own interests, rather than in the interests of their constituents. Madison emphasized that a system of checks and balances would prevent this from happening and he uses the quote to show that checks and balances are necessary because men are not necessarily all angels. This also ties back into the ideas of liberty and equal opportunity that Madison emphasizes through this Federalist paper.

In addition, the original idea of checks and balances was a European idea that had roots in the enlightenment period. Political philosophers such as John Locke and Jean-Jacques Rousseau had ideas that related to this proposal. Further, the idea of representative democracy as a method of establishing these checks and balances is a pivotal component to the federalist paper, mostly because it helps explain how the different branches of government will be put into place. The idea of checks and balances existed in other countries, prior to the establishment of this system in the United States, suggesting that the idea of the political separation of powers and of checks and balances in government that was implemented in the United States is a universal concept that is concrete in political theory. Thus, the inclusion of this theory in Federalist 51 can be seen as a reiteration of a sentiment that was already present on an international scale.

The Federalist papers, as a foundation text of constitutional interpretation, are commonly cited by American jurists and court systems in general. Of all The Federalist papers, No. 51 is the fourth most-cited document.

== Purpose ==
The purpose of No. 51 is, according to Madison, to inform the reader of the safeguards created by the convention to maintain the separate branches of government and to protect the rights of the people and of the country. The biggest threats to the government of the United States would be the ability of one governing branch to obtain too much power over another, and of factions to cause a tyranny of the majority.

=== Dependency and encroachment ===
Madison's key point is that the members of each department should have as little dependence as possible on the members of the other departments, and to stay independent, their own department must not encroach on the others. To secure these ends, Madison suggests that "the necessary constitutional means... and personal motives" are to enable each department (or the leader of the department) to fend off attempts to encroach upon the government of each other's departments. Each branch should have as little influence as possible in the appointment of members of other branches, and should also retain financial independence from one another to prevent corruption.

=== Legislature ===
In a republican form of government, Madison asserts, the legislative branch is the strongest, and therefore must be divided into different branches, be as little connected with each other as possible, and render them by different modes of election. He deems the legislative branch to be the strongest since it is essentially the true voice of the people. (Before the Seventeenth Amendment, only the House of Representatives was chosen directly by the people. The Senate was chosen by state legislatures.) He stresses the need for the checks and balances.

=== Usurpations and security ===
The government is guarded against usurpations because it is divided into distinct and separate departments.

In 1787, power over people was divided both through federalism (between the federal government and the state governments) and through branches (legislative, executive, and judicial) within the national (or federal) government. Because of the division of power, a "double security arises to the rights of the people. The governments will control each other, at the same time that each will be controlled by itself by the use of checks and balances".

=== Factions ===
Madison discusses at great length the issue of Political factions and their ability to allow the oppression of the minority opinion by the majority. He recognizes that factions will always be present and that the only way to counteract the effects of factions is to either have a "community will" or to have a greater diversity of interest groups so that no singular faction can become the majority. He recognizes that this first option can also lead to injustices, so the best solution is for society to have a multitude of different groups and classes to prevent tyranny. In other words, even if individuals mingle with other members of the same social groups, ideals, and goals, no particular group should be able to become so strong as to thwart the interest of all other groups. No faction can become large enough to overthrow all other factions in a well-run republic, which is why Madison believes the greatest self-governance can occur in a large society.

Factions had been further discussed in Federalist No. 10.

== Notes ==
1. Ira C. Lupu, "The Most-Cited Federalist Papers." 15 Constitutional Commentary 403-410 (1997)
2. James n, "Federalist, No. 51." (1787)
