= Federalist No. 66 =

Federalist Paper by Alexander Hamilton

- Alexander Hamilton, author of Federalist No. 66
- Author: Alexander Hamilton
- Original title: Objections to the Power of the Senate To Set as a Court for Impeachments Further Considered
- Language: English
- Publisher: The Independent Journal
- Publication date: March 8, 1788
- Publication place: United States
- Media type: Newspaper
- Preceded by: Federalist No. 65
- Followed by: Federalist No. 67

Federalist No. 66 is an essay by Alexander Hamilton, the sixty-sixth of The Federalist Papers. It was published on March 8, 1788, under the pseudonym Publius, the name under which all The Federalist papers were published. The title is "Objections to the Power of the Senate To Set as a Court for Impeachments Further Considered".

In this paper, Hamilton addresses specific objections to the power of the Senate to try impeachment cases, a discussion that is continued from the previous essay.

== Background ==
The Federalist Papers, written by Alexander Hamilton and his colleagues John Jay and James Madison, were written in the late 1780s to argue in favor of the ratification of the United States Constitution to replace the Articles of Confederation, which served as the first form of a constitution for the newly-freed country. The Federalist Papers were directed towards the Anti-Federalists, those who opposed a stronger general government (especially the New York Anti-Federalists), to persuade them and undecided citizens to ratify the Constitution. The first Federalist Paper was published on October 27, 1787, in the New York Independent Journal. The essays argued that the proposed government would preserve the Union and give power to the federal government to act in the nation's interest.

== Publication ==
Federalist No. 66 was written by Alexander Hamilton, who represented New York in the Congress of the United States under the Articles of Confederation and had served as a deputy from New York at the Constitutional Convention in 1787. It was titled "Objections to the Power of the Senate To Set as a Court for Impeachments Further Considered" and was first published on March 8, 1788, in the New York Independent Journal under the pseudonym Publius.

== Anti-Federalist responses ==
There were three different responses for Federalist No. 66. The people who responded were Joseph Taylor, William Porter, and Timothy Bloodworth. One of the responses was that "none can impeach but the representatives; and the impeachments are to be determined by the senators, who are one of the branches of power which we dread under this Constitution." Another response was that the United States "shall undoubtedly, for instance, have a great number of tax-gatherers. If any of these officers shall do wrong, when we come to fundamental principles, we find that we have no way to punish them but by going to Congress, at an immense distance, whither we must carry our witnesses." Another response was that the people "wish[ed] to be informed, whether this sole power of impeachment, given to the House of Representatives, deprived the state of the power of impeaching any of its members."

== Hamilton's argument ==
Hamilton structures his argument as a series of rebuttals to various Anti-Federalist arguments about the U.S. Senate having the power to impeach and the Senate's potential to overreach its authority. Under the Constitution, the U.S. House of Representatives can impeach a government official serving as a prosecutor. The Senate has the sole power to conduct impeachment trials, serving as jury and judge. The first argument he rebuts is that if the Senate acts as a court for impeachments, it infringes on the judicial branch's power. He argues that some intermixture of minor forms of power is necessary to prevent more significant abuses and that allowing the Senate to serve as an impeachment court serves as a check and balance on the powers of the president of the United States and is worth the small encroachment on the power of the Supreme Court. The second argument Hamilton addresses is that the Senate could gain so much power that it would soon become aristocratic; if the Senate were given more power, it would be able to control too much of the government. Hamilton refutes this argument by pointing out that under all historical republican governments, the lower house of the legislature – its correspondent house of representatives – always, as a natural result of being the more popular branch of the legislature, would predominate over the upper house – its correspondent senate – and adds that the House can act as an effective counterbalance to the Senate because of its certain exclusive powers; particularly, the "sole power" to impeach. The third argument states that "the senators will not be able to impartially judge presidential appointees who they once voted to confirm." Hamilton says that the Senate would rely on "evidences of guilt so extraordinary." The last argument is that senators cannot impartially judge themselves for their role in ratifying foreign treaties. The Senate would not appoint itself to deal with foreign treaties. Hamilton felt that this would allow for an unbiased decision regarding making treaties.

== Modern day analysis ==
Today, the Federalist Papers are admired for their insights into human nature and the character of republican government. It was likewise praised for its easily understood review of the proposed Constitution's provisions and its persuasive arguments for their efficacy. These papers helped people to understand why Hamilton, Madison, and Jay wanted the Constitution to be ratified and what they wanted it to look like.
