= Federalist No. 81 =

Third-most cited Federalist Paper; by Alexander Hamilton on the judiciary

- Alexander Hamilton, author of Federalist No. 81
- Author: Alexander Hamilton
- Original title: The Judiciary Continued, and the Distribution of the Judicial Authority
- Language: English
- Publisher: The Independent Journal, New York Packet, The Daily Advertiser
- Publication date: June 25, 1788 and June 28, 1788
- Publication place: United States
- Media type: Newspaper
- Preceded by: Federalist No. 80
- Followed by: Federalist No. 82

Federalist No. 81 is an essay by Alexander Hamilton, the eighty-first of The Federalist Papers. It was published on June 25 and 28, 1788 under the pseudonym Publius, the name under which all The Federalist papers were published. The title is "The Judiciary Continued, and the Distribution of the Judicial Authority", and it is the fourth in a series of six essays discussing the powers and limitations of the Judicial branch.

The Federalist Papers, as a foundation text of constitutional interpretation, are frequently cited by American jurists. Of all the essays, No. 81 is the third-most cited, behind only Federalist No. 42 and Federalist No. 78. Federalist No. 81 addresses how the powers of the judiciary should be distributed. It deals with potential fears for the irreversible effects of judicial activism.

== Background ==
Before the U.S Constitution was implemented the states were held together by the Articles of Confederation, which served as a loose tie between the states during the Revolutionary War. The articles were lacking in many ways and was unsuitable to create a long lasting and effective government capable of sustaining a nation. It became apparent that the U.S. would not last long if they could not draft a constitution capable of offering both the people and states security. In May 1787 a national convention was held to discern what was currently wrong inside the union and how to address those issues within a new constitution which would unite the states.

The outline of the constitution was promising, but it would not be very productive to simply drop an entire new system of government on a nation without first outlining the process first. John Jay, James Madison, and Alexander Hamilton together collaborated on what would be known as the Federalist Papers a series of papers published in newspapers outlining exactly how the constitution would work while taking input and defending itself from criticism.

== The Judiciary Continued ==
Federalist No. 81 Outlines and explains how the various courts of the U.S. will work in tandem to create a system that ensures that laws are both fair and equal across the country. The Supreme Court and its relation to state legislatures is the main focus of this paper. Hamilton spends the majority of the piece defending and outlining the necessity of a supreme court in order to protect and preserve the rights of the citizens. Hamilton Wrote "The power of constituting inferior courts is evidently calculated to obviate the necessity of having recourse to the Supreme Court in every case of federal cognizance. It is intended to enable the national government to institute or AUTHORIZE, in each State or district of the United States, a tribunal competent to the determination of matters of national jurisdiction within its limits.". The main need for the supreme court was to ensure that states could not directly interfere with and degrade the average citizens constitutional rights.

== State sovereign immunity ==
Federalist No. 81 contained the following comments on state sovereign immunity:

It has been suggested that an assignment of the public securities of one State to the citizens of another, would enable them to prosecute that State in the federal courts for the amount of those securities; a suggestion which the following considerations prove to be without foundation.
It is inherent in the nature of sovereignty not to be amenable to the suit of an individual without its consent. This is the general sense, and the general practice of mankind; and the exemption, as one of the attributes of sovereignty, is now enjoyed by the government of every State in the Union. Unless, therefore, there is a surrender of this immunity in the plan of the convention, it will remain with the States, and the danger intimated must be merely ideal. The circumstances which are necessary to produce an alienation of State sovereignty were discussed in considering the article of taxation, and need not be repeated here. A recurrence to the principles there established will satisfy us, that there is no color to pretend that the State governments would, by the adoption of that plan, be divested of the privilege of paying their own debts in their own way, free from every constraint but that which flows from the obligations of good faith. The contracts between a nation and individuals are only binding on the conscience of the sovereign, and have no pretensions to a compulsive force. They confer no right of action, independent of the sovereign will. To what purpose would it be to authorize suits against States for the debts they owe? How could recoveries be enforced? It is evident, it could not be done without waging war against the contracting State; and to ascribe to the federal courts, by mere implication, and in destruction of a pre-existing right of the State governments, a power which would involve such a consequence, would be altogether forced and unwarrantable.

The Supreme Court quoted these paragraphs in Hans v. Louisiana (1890).

== Impact ==
Federalist 81 also made mention as to how an ordinary citizen could sue their state. The first landmark case where such an event took place was Chisholm v. Georgia where Alexander Chisholm sued Georgia for holding back payments that were owed to him but Georgia refused claiming a state could only be sued if it consented, too. The Supreme Court held that the State could be sued. This led to outrage and eventually the adoption of the Eleventh Amendment. Another major case Where Federalist 81 was put to the test was Hans v. Louisiana where Hans had tried to sue his home state on an issue that was not directly threatening his civil liberties. The Eleventh Amendment had left out if a state could be sued by a citizen of that same state. The court then set precedent that the ability to sue a state would be defined by instances where a state has ignored a person's liberties as defined by their constitutional rights.

== Notes ==
1. Ira C. Lupu, "The Most-Cited Federalist Papers." 15 Constitutional Commentary 403-410 (1998)
