= Federalist No. 65 =

Federalist Paper by Alexander Hamilton

- Alexander Hamilton, author of Federalist No. 65
- Author: Alexander Hamilton
- Original title: The Powers of the Senate Continued
- Language: English
- Publisher: The Independent Journal, New York Packet, The Daily Advertiser
- Publication date: March 7, 1788
- Publication place: United States
- Media type: Newspaper
- Preceded by: Federalist No. 64
- Followed by: Federalist No. 66

Federalist No. 65 is an essay by Alexander Hamilton, the sixty-fifth of The Federalist Papers. It was published on March 7, 1788, under the pseudonym "Publius", the name under which all The Federalist papers were published. Titled "The Powers of the Senate Continued", it carries on a theme begun by John Jay in Federalist No. 64.

== Overview ==
Publius begins by discussing the U.S. Senate's role as a "judiciary character" during the trial of impeachments. Federalist 65 is the only essay in the Federalist Papers that specifically delineates the Framers’ intended use and purpose of the impeachment and removal power. The constitution defines impeachable offenses as "treason, bribery, or other high crimes and misdemeanors." The latter definition of "high crimes and misdemeanors" left ambiguity and room for interpretation within the realm of impeachment. Publius, however, goes on to designate the scope of impeachment to:

"The subject of [impeachment's] jurisdiction are those offences which proceed from the misconduct of men, or in other words, from the abuse or violation of some public trust. They are of a nature which may with peculiar propriety be denominated POLITICAL, as they relate chiefly to injuries done immediately to the society itself."

Because the accused offence is political and directly related to the public trust, Publius explains that the unfortunate side-effect of impeachment will subsequently agitate the passions of the entire community and divide individuals into parties and factions. The impeachment inquiry will thus become not entirely based upon the offense itself but also on rival factions' pre-existing biases and personal interests. Publius asserts that "...in such cases there will always be the greatest danger, that the decision will be regulated more by the comparative strength of parties, than by the real demonstrations of innocence or guilt." Looking retrospectively at previous impeachments or impeachment attempts, there does seem to be true to the fact that initial resentment and passion were leading factors in the pursuit of impeachment.

Publius then questions whether the Senate is the proper depository for such a power. He explains that the proposed model of dividing the vote of impeachment and the trial between the U.S. House of Representatives and the Senate was not the Constitutional Convention's original idea but rather was borrowed by the system in place in the British Parliament. In the British system, the House of Commons votes upon the call for impeachment, and then if impeached, the trial takes place in the House of Lords. The system has been successful, but Publius continues by asking if this model is proper for our proposed government. Ultimately Publius says that no other group is capable of such a task. He states, "What other body would be likely to feel confidence enough in its own situation, to preserve, unawed and uninfluenced, the necessary impartiality between an individual accused, and the representatives of the people, his accusers?"

Publius goes through other possible bodies that could act as a tribunal or jury. He states that the Supreme Court is an obvious choice for a trial, however upon his further inspection, he notes that certain parties could contest the results of the trial and that the Supreme Court, an unelected body, may not have the "degree of credit and authority" to settle any qualms brought on as a result of the trial. The Supreme Court also has only a small number of individuals; Publius states that the number of jurors must be high enough to prove without a doubt that an overwhelming number of individuals were convinced of the guilt of the accused.
