= Federalist No. 79 =

Federalist Paper by Alexander Hamilton

- Alexander Hamilton, author of Federalist No. 79
- Author: Alexander Hamilton
- Original title: The Judiciary Continued
- Language: English
- Publisher: J. & A. McLean; The Independent Journal, New York Packet, The Daily Advertiser
- Publication date: May 28, 1788; June 18, 1788
- Publication place: United States
- Media type: Book, Newspaper
- Preceded by: Federalist No. 78
- Followed by: Federalist No. 80

Federalist No. 79 is an essay by Alexander Hamilton, the seventy-ninth of The Federalist Papers. It was published in a book collection on May 28, 1788, but first appeared in a newspaper, where most readers would have seen it, on June 18 of that year. It appeared under the pseudonym Publius, the name under which all The Federalist papers were published whether they were written by Hamilton, John Jay, or James Madison. Its title is "The Judiciary Continued", and it is the second in a series of six essays discussing the powers and limitations of the judicial branch.

== Publius' argument ==
In Federalist No. 78, Hamilton argued that "permanence in office," as enshrined in lifelong appointments, was the most important guarantee of the independence of the judiciary. In No. 79 he states that the other main guarantee of that independence is the provision in the proposed Constitution of the United States for the financial independence of judges. Hamilton also argues that the ability of Congress to impeach judges provides protection against their misconduct despite their relative independence.
