= The Federalist Papers =

1788 essay collection by Alexander Hamilton, James Madison, and John Jay

The Federalist
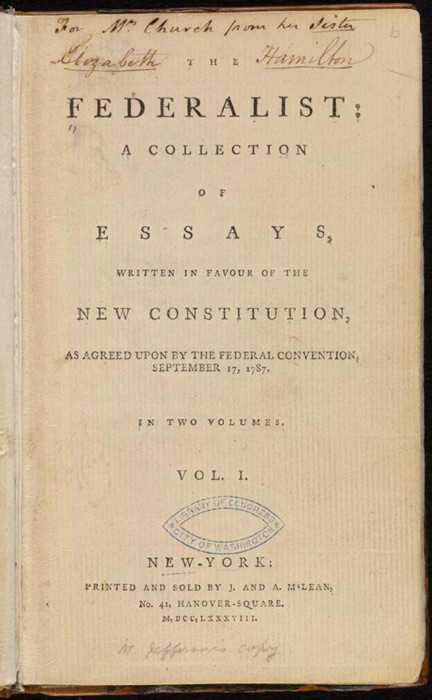
- Title page of the first collection of The Federalist (1788). This specific volume was a gift from Elizabeth Schuyler Hamilton, Alexander Hamilton's wife, to her sister Angelica
- Authors: Alexander Hamilton; James Madison; John Jay; (all under the pseudonym 'Publius')
- Original title: The Federalist: A Collection of Essays, Written in Favour of the New Constitution, as Agreed upon by the Federal Convention, September 17, 1787
- Language: English
- Publisher: The Independent Journal; New York Packet; The Daily Advertiser; J. & A. McLean
- Publication date: October 27, 1787 – May 28, 1788
- Publication place: United States
- Media type: Newspaper; book
- Text: The Federalist at Wikisource

The Federalist is a collection of 85 articles and essays written by Alexander Hamilton, James Madison, and John Jay under the collective pseudonym Publius to promote the ratification of the Constitution of the United States. The papers themselves came to be known collectively as the Federalist Papers beginning in the nineteenth century.

The first seventy-seven of these essays were published serially in the Independent Journal, the New York Packet, and the Daily Advertiser between October 1787 and April 1788. A compilation of these 77 essays and eight others were published in two volumes as The Federalist: A Collection of Essays, Written in Favour of the New Constitution, as Agreed upon by the Federal Convention, September 17, 1787, by publishing firm J. & A. McLean in March and May 1788. The last eight papers (Nos. 78–85) were republished in the New York newspapers between June 14 and August 16, 1788.

The authors of The Federalist intended to influence the voters to ratify the Constitution. In Federalist No. 1, Hamilton explicitly sets that debate in broad political terms:

It has been frequently remarked, that it seems to have been reserved to the people of this country, by their conduct and example, to decide the important question, whether societies of men are really capable or not, of establishing good government from reflection and choice, or whether they are forever destined to depend, for their political constitutions, on accident and force.

In Federalist No. 10, Madison discusses the means of preventing rule by majority faction and advocates a large, commercial republic. This is complemented by Federalist No. 14, in which Madison takes the measure of the United States, declares it appropriate for an extended republic, and concludes with a memorable defense of the constitutional and political creativity of the Federal Convention.

In Federalist No. 84, Hamilton makes the case that there is no need to amend the Constitution by adding a Bill of Rights, insisting that the various provisions in the proposed Constitution protecting liberty amount to a "bill of rights". Federalist No. 78, also written by Hamilton, lays the groundwork for the doctrine of judicial review by federal courts of federal legislation or executive acts. Federalist No. 70 presents Hamilton's case for a one-man chief executive. In Federalist No. 39, Madison presents the clearest exposition of what has come to be called "Federalism". In Federalist No. 51, Madison distills arguments for checks and balances in an essay often cited for its justification of government as "the greatest of all reflections on human nature." According to historian Richard B. Morris, the essays that make up The Federalist Papers are an "incomparable exposition of the Constitution, a classic in political science unsurpassed in both breadth and depth by the product of any later American writer."

On June 21, 1788, the proposed Constitution was ratified by the minimum of nine states required under Article VII. In late July 1788, with eleven states having ratified the new Constitution, the process of organizing the new government began.

== History ==
=== Origins ===
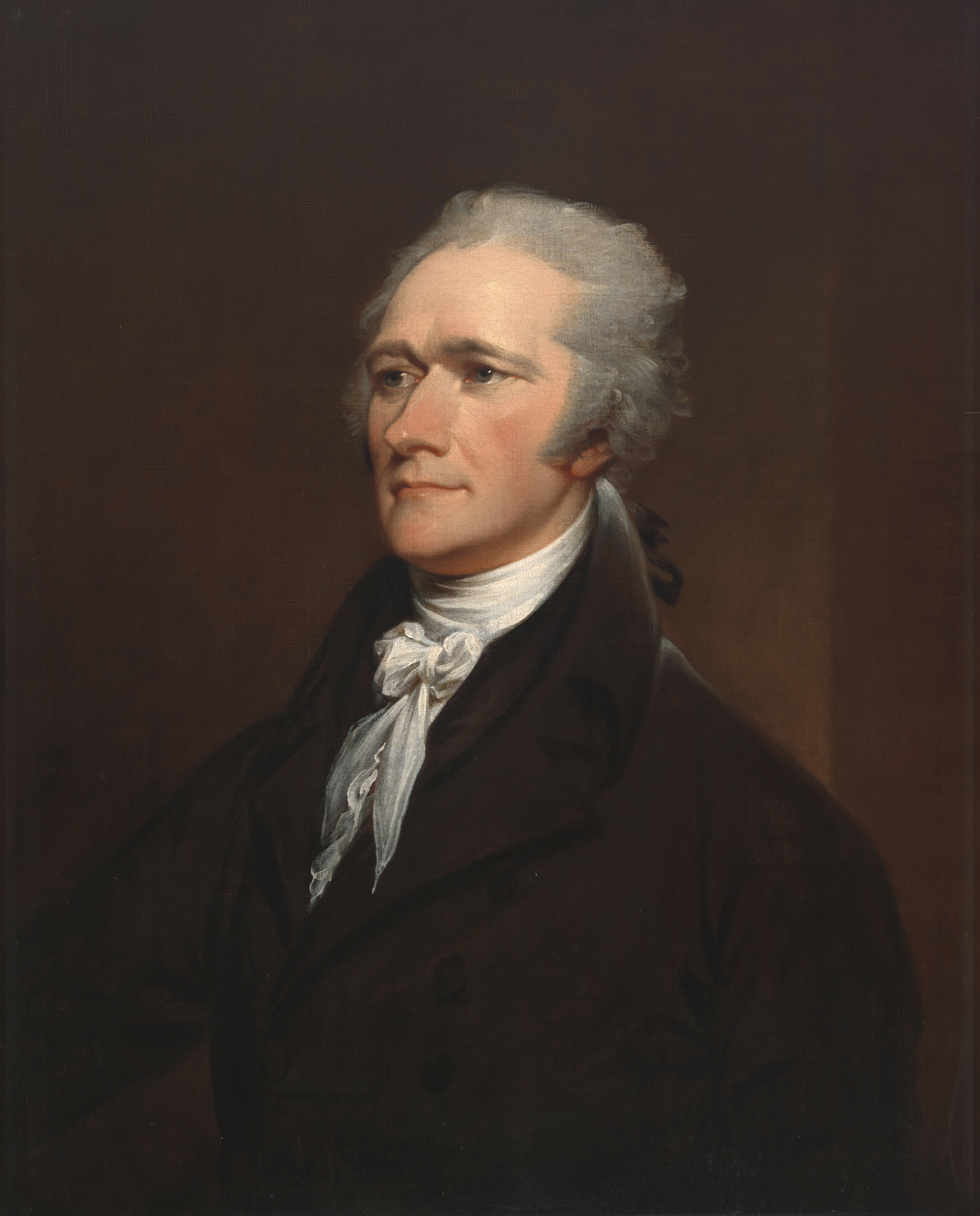
Alexander Hamilton, author of the majority of The Federalist Papers

The Federal Convention (Constitutional Convention) sent the proposed Constitution to the Confederation Congress, which in turn submitted it to the states for ratification at the end of September 1787. On September 27, 1787, "Cato" first appeared in the New York press criticizing the proposition; "Brutus" followed on October 18, 1787. These and other articles and public letters critical of the new Constitution would eventually become known as the "Anti-Federalist Papers". In response, Alexander Hamilton decided to launch a measured defense and extensive explanation of the proposed Constitution to the people of the state of New York. He wrote in Federalist No. 1 that the series would "endeavor to give a satisfactory answer to all the objections which shall have made their appearance, that may seem to have any claim to your attention."

Hamilton recruited collaborators for the project. He enlisted John Jay, who after four essays (Federalist Nos. 2, 3, 4, and 5), fell ill and contributed only one more essay, Federalist No. 64, to the series. Jay also distilled his case into a pamphlet in the spring of 1788, An Address to the People of the State of New-York; Hamilton cited it approvingly in Federalist No. 85. James Madison, present in New York as a Virginia delegate to the Confederation Congress, was recruited by Hamilton and Jay and became Hamilton's primary collaborator. Gouverneur Morris and William Duer were also considered. However, Morris turned down the invitation, and Hamilton rejected three essays written by Duer. Duer later wrote in support of the three Federalist authors under the name "Philo-Publius", meaning either "Friend of the People" or "Friend of Hamilton" based on Hamilton's pen name Publius.

Hamilton chose the pseudonymous name "Publius". While many other pieces representing both sides of the constitutional debate were written under Roman names, historian Albert Furtwangler contends that "'Publius' was a cut above 'Caesar' or 'Brutus' or even 'Cato'. Publius Valerius helped found the ancient republic of Rome. His more famous name, Publicola, meant 'friend of the people'." Hamilton had applied this pseudonym to three letters in 1778, in which he attacked fellow Federalist Samuel Chase and revealed that Chase had taken advantage of knowledge gained in Congress to try to dominate the flour market.

=== Authorship ===
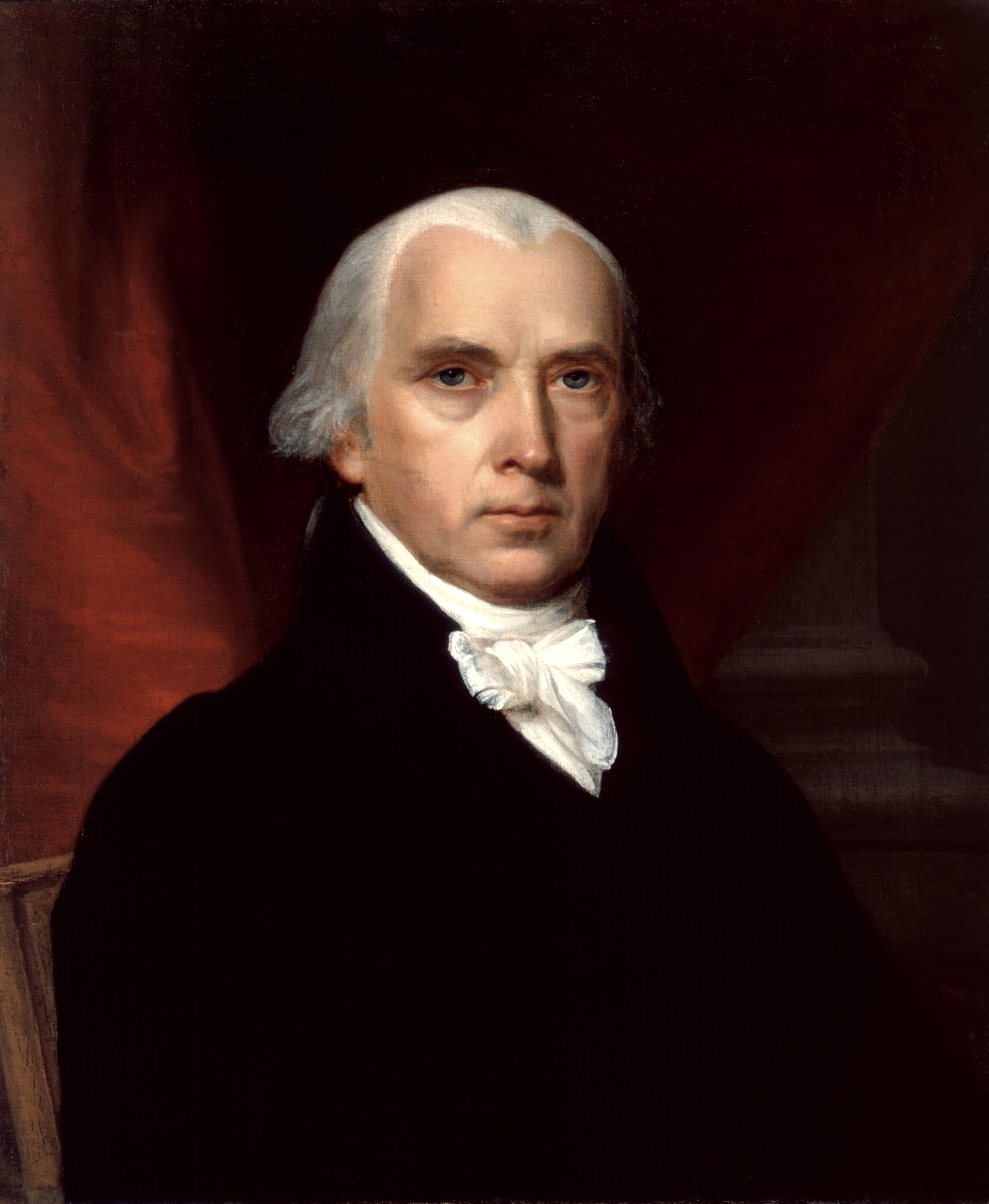
James Madison, Hamilton's major collaborator, later fourth president of the United States (1809-1817)

At the time of publication, the authors of The Federalist Papers attempted to hide their identities due to Hamilton and Madison having attended the convention. Astute observers, however, correctly discerned the identities of Hamilton, Madison, and Jay. Establishing authorial authenticity of the essays that constitute The Federalist Papers has not always been clear. After Hamilton's death in 1804, a list emerged, claiming that he alone had written two-thirds of The Federalist essays. Some believe that several of these essays were written by Madison (Nos. 49–58 and 62–63). The scholarly detective work of Douglass Adair in 1944 postulated the following assignments of authorship, corroborated in 1964 by a statistical analysis of the text:

- Alexander Hamilton (51 articles: Nos. 1, 6–9, 11–13, 15–17, 21–36, 59–61, and 65–85)
- James Madison (29 articles: Nos. 10, 14, 18–20, (Note: Nos. 18, 19, 20 are frequently indicated as being jointly written by Hamilton and Madison. However, Adair concurs with previous historians that these are Madison's writing alone: "Madison had certainly written all of the essays himself, including in revised form only a small amount of pertinent information submitted by Hamilton from his rather sketchy research on the same subject.") 37–58 and 62–63)
- John Jay (5 articles: Nos. 2–5 and 64).

In six months, a total of 85 articles were written by the three men.

Hamilton, who had been a leading advocate of national constitutional reform throughout the 1780s and was one of the three representatives for New York at the Constitutional Convention, in 1789 became the first secretary of the treasury, a post he held until his resignation in 1795.

Madison, who is now acknowledged as the father of the Constitution, despite his repeated rejection of this honor during his lifetime, became a leading member of the U.S. House of Representatives from Virginia (1789–1797), secretary of state (1801–1809), and ultimately the fourth president of the United States (1809–1817).

John Jay, who had been secretary for foreign affairs under the Articles of Confederation from 1784 through their expiration in 1789, became the first Chief Justice of the United States in 1789, stepping down in 1795 to accept election as governor of New York, a post he held for two terms, retiring in 1801.

=== Publication ===
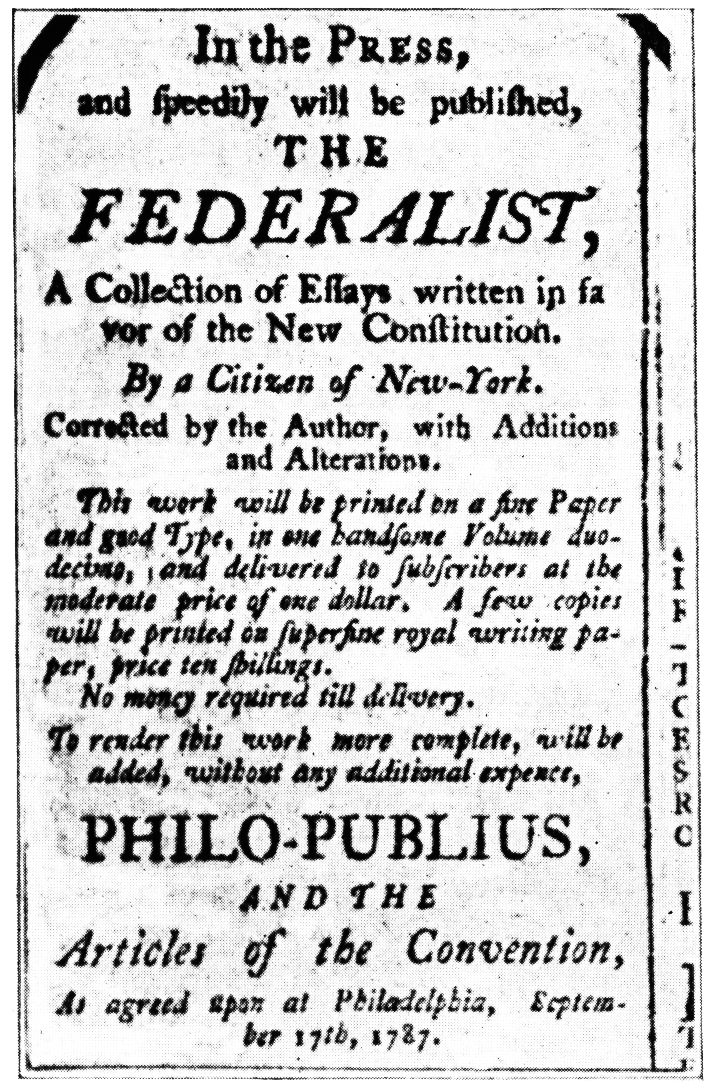
An advertisement for the book edition of The Federalist

The Federalist articles appeared in three New York newspapers: The Independent Journal, the New-York Packet, and the Daily Advertiser, beginning on October 27, 1787. Although written and published with haste, The Federalist articles were widely read and greatly influenced the shape of American political institutions. Hamilton, Madison and Jay published the essays at a rapid pace. At times, three to four new essays by Publius appeared in the papers in a single week. Garry Wills observes that this fast pace of production "overwhelmed" any possible response: "Who, given ample time could have answered such a battery of arguments? And no time was given." Hamilton also encouraged the reprinting of the essays in newspapers outside New York state, and indeed they were published in several other states where the ratification debate was taking place. However, they were only irregularly published outside New York, and in other parts of the country they were often overshadowed by local writers.

Because the essays were initially published in New York, most of them begin with the same salutation: "To the People of the State of New York".

The high demand for the essays led to their publication in a more permanent form. On January 1, 1788, the New York publishing firm J. & A. McLean announced that they would publish the first 36 essays as a bound volume; that volume was released on March 22, 1788, and was titled The Federalist Volume 1. New essays continued to appear in the newspapers; Federalist No. 77 was the last number to appear first in that form, on April 2. A second bound volume was released on May 28, containing Federalist Nos. 37–77 and the previously unpublished Nos. 78–85. The last eight papers (Nos. 78–85) were republished in the New York newspapers between June 14 and August 16, 1788.

A 1792 French edition ended the collective anonymity of Publius, announcing that the work had been written by "Mm. Hamilton, Maddisson e Gay, citoyens de l'État de New York". In 1802, George Hopkins published an American edition that similarly named the authors. Hopkins wished as well that "the name of the writer should be prefixed to each number," but at this point Hamilton insisted that this was not to be, and the division of the essays among the three authors remained a secret.

The first publication to divide the papers in such a way was an 1810 edition that used a list left by Hamilton to associate the authors with their numbers; this edition appeared as two volumes of the compiled "Works of Hamilton". In 1818, Jacob Gideon published a new edition with a new listing of authors, based on a list provided by Madison. The difference between Hamilton's list and Madison's formed the basis for a dispute over the authorship of a dozen of the essays.

Both Hopkins's and Gideon's editions incorporated significant edits to the text of the papers themselves, generally with the approval of the authors. In 1863, Henry Dawson published an edition containing the original text of the papers, arguing that they should be preserved as they were written in that particular historical moment, not as edited by the authors years later.

Modern scholars generally use the text prepared by Jacob E. Cooke for his 1961 edition of The Federalist; this edition used the newspaper texts for essay numbers 1–76 and the McLean edition for essay numbers 77–85.

=== Disputed essays ===
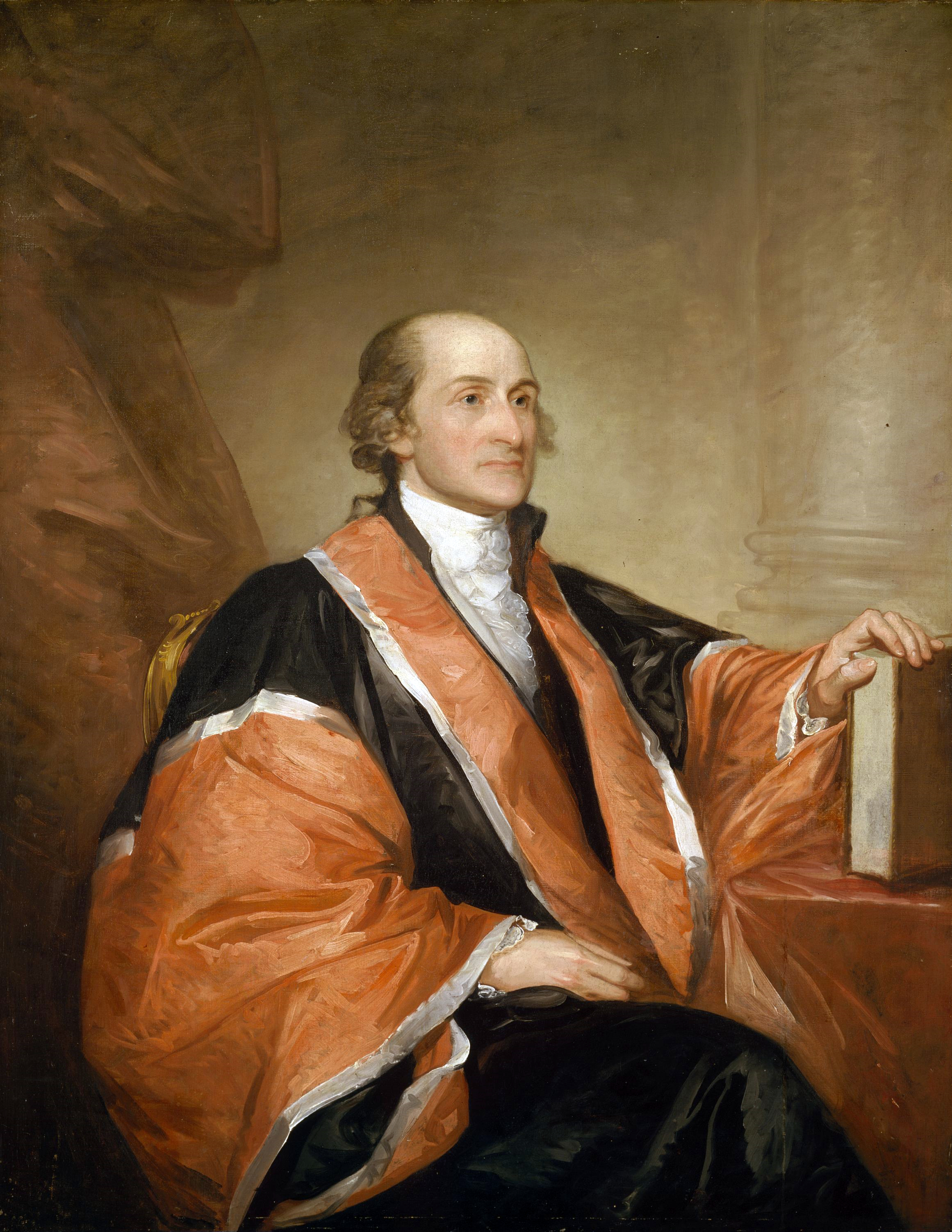
Portrait of John Jay by Gilbert Stuart. Jay, author of five of The Federalist Papers, later became the first chief justice of the United States

While the authorship of 73 of The Federalist essays is fairly certain, the identities of those who wrote the twelve remaining essays are disputed by some scholars. The modern consensus is that Madison wrote essays Nos. 49–58, with Nos. 18–20 being products of a collaboration between him and Hamilton; No. 64 was by John Jay. The first open designation of which essay belonged to whom was provided by Hamilton who, in the days before his ultimately fatal gun duel with Aaron Burr, provided his lawyer with a list detailing the author of each number. This list credited Hamilton with a full 63 of the essays (three of those being jointly written with Madison), almost three-quarters of the whole, and was used as the basis for an 1810 printing that was the first to make specific attribution for the essays.

Madison did not immediately dispute Hamilton's list, but provided his own list for the 1818 Gideon edition of The Federalist. Madison claimed 29 essays for himself, and he suggested that the difference between the two lists was "owing doubtless to the hurry in which [Hamilton's] memorandum was made out." A known error in Hamilton's list—Hamilton incorrectly ascribed No. 54 to John Jay, when in fact, Jay wrote No. 64—provided some evidence for Madison's suggestion.

Statistical analysis has been undertaken on several occasions in attempts to accurately identify the author of each individual essay. After examining word choice and writing style, studies generally agree that the disputed essays were written by James Madison. However, there are notable exceptions maintaining that some of the essays which are now widely attributed to Madison were, in fact, collaborative efforts.

=== Influence on the ratification debates ===
The Federalist Papers were written to support the ratification of the Constitution, specifically in New York. Whether they succeeded in this mission is questionable. Separate ratification proceedings took place in each state, and the essays were not reliably reprinted outside of New York; furthermore, by the time the series was well underway, a number of important states had already ratified it, for instance Pennsylvania on December 12. New York held out until July 26; certainly The Federalist was more important there than anywhere else, but historian Albert Furtwangler argues that it "could hardly rival other major forces in the ratification contests"—specifically, these forces included the personal influence of well-known Federalists, for instance Hamilton and Jay, and Anti-Federalists, including Governor George Clinton. Further, by the time New York came to a vote, ten states had already ratified the Constitution and it had thus already passed—only nine states had to ratify it for the new government to be established among them; the ratification by Virginia, the tenth state, placed pressure on New York to ratify. In light of that, Furtwangler observes, "New York's refusal would make that state an odd outsider."

Only 19 Federalists were elected to New York's ratification convention, compared to the Anti-Federalists' 46 delegates. While New York did indeed ratify the Constitution on July 26, the lack of public support for pro-Constitution Federalists has led historian John Kaminski to suggest that the impact of The Federalist on New York citizens was "negligible".

As for Virginia, which ratified the Constitution only at its convention on June 25, Hamilton writes in a letter to Madison that the collected edition of The Federalist had been sent to Virginia; Furtwangler presumes that it was to act as a "debater's handbook for the convention there", though he claims that this indirect influence would be a "dubious distinction". Probably of greater importance to the Virginia debate, in any case, were George Washington's support for the proposed Constitution and the presence of Madison and Edmund Randolph, the governor, at the convention arguing for ratification.

== Structure and content ==
In Federalist No. 1, Hamilton listed six topics to be covered in the subsequent articles:

1. "The utility of the UNION to your political prosperity"—covered in No. 2 through No. 14
2. "The insufficiency of the present Confederation to preserve that Union"—covered in No. 15 through No. 22
3. "The necessity of a government at least equally energetic with the one proposed to the attainment of this object"—covered in No. 23 through No. 36
4. "The conformity of the proposed constitution to the true principles of republican government"—covered in No. 37 through No. 84
5. "Its analogy to your own state constitution"—covered in No. 85
6. "The additional security which its adoption will afford to the preservation of that species of government, to liberty and to prosperity"—covered in No. 85.

Furtwangler notes that as the series grew, this plan was somewhat changed. The fourth topic expanded into detailed coverage of the individual articles of the Constitution and the institutions it mandated, while the two last topics were merely touched on in the last essay.

The papers can be broken down by author as well as by topic. At the start of the series, all three authors were contributing; the first 20 papers are broken down as 11 by Hamilton, five by Madison and four by Jay. The rest of the series, however, is dominated by three long segments by a single writer: Nos. 21–36 by Hamilton, Nos. 37–58 by Madison, written while Hamilton was in Albany, and No. 65 through the end by Hamilton, published after Madison had left for Virginia.

=== Opposition to the Bill of Rights ===
The Federalist Papers (specifically Federalist No. 84) are notable for their opposition to what later became the United States Bill of Rights. The idea of adding a bill of rights to the Constitution was originally controversial because the Constitution, as written, did not specifically enumerate or protect the rights of the people; rather, it was intended to list the powers of the government and left all that remained to the states and the people. Alexander Hamilton, the author of Federalist No. 84, feared that such an enumeration, once written down explicitly, would later be interpreted as a list of the only rights that people had.

However, Hamilton's opposition to a Bill of Rights was far from universal. Robert Yates, writing under the pseudonym "Brutus", articulated this view point in the so-called Anti-Federalist No. 84, asserting that a government unrestrained by such a bill could easily devolve into tyranny. References in The Federalist and in the ratification debates warn of demagogues of the variety who through divisive appeals would aim at tyranny. The Federalist begins and ends with this issue. In the final paper Hamilton offers "a lesson of moderation to all sincere lovers of the Union, and ought to put them on their guard against hazarding anarchy, civil war, a perpetual alienation of the States from each other, and perhaps the military despotism of a successful demagogue". The matter was further clarified by the Ninth Amendment.

== Judicial use ==
Federal judges, when interpreting the Constitution, frequently use The Federalist Papers as a contemporary account of the intentions of the framers and ratifiers. They have been applied on issues ranging from the power of the federal government in foreign affairs (in Hines v. Davidowitz) to the validity of ex post facto laws (in the 1798 decision Calder v. Bull, apparently the first decision to mention The Federalist). By 2000, The Federalist had been quoted 291 times in Supreme Court decisions.

The amount of deference that should be given to The Federalist Papers in constitutional interpretation has always been somewhat controversial. As early as 1819, Chief Justice John Marshall noted in the famous case McCulloch v. Maryland, that "the opinions expressed by the authors of that work have been justly supposed to be entitled to great respect in expounding the Constitution. No tribute can be paid to them which exceeds their merit; but in applying their opinions to the cases which may arise in the progress of our government, a right to judge of their correctness must be retained." In a letter to Thomas Ritchie in 1821, James Madison stated of the Constitution that "the legitimate meaning of the Instrument must be derived from the text itself; or if a key is to be sought elsewhere, it must be not in the opinions or intentions of the Body which planned & proposed the Constitution, but in the sense attached to it by the people in their respective State Conventions where it recd. all the authority which it possesses."

== Complete list ==
The colors used to highlight the rows correspond to the author of the paper.

Alexander Hamilton
John Jay
James Madison

#	Date	Title	Author
1	October 27, 1787	General Introduction	Alexander Hamilton
2	October 31, 1787	Concerning Dangers from Foreign Force and Influence	John Jay
3	November 3, 1787	The Same Subject Continued: Concerning Dangers from Foreign Force and Influence	John Jay
4	November 7, 1787	The Same Subject Continued: Concerning Dangers from Foreign Force and Influence	John Jay
5	November 10, 1787	The Same Subject Continued: Concerning Dangers from Foreign Force and Influence	John Jay
6	November 14, 1787	Concerning Dangers from Dissensions Between the States	Alexander Hamilton
7	November 15, 1787	The Same Subject Continued: Concerning Dangers from Dissensions Between the States	Alexander Hamilton
8	November 20, 1787	The Consequences of Hostilities Between the States	Alexander Hamilton
9	November 21, 1787	The Utility of the Union as a Safeguard Against Domestic Faction and Insurrection	Alexander Hamilton
10	November 22, 1787	The Same Subject Continued: The Union as a Safeguard Against Domestic Faction and Insurrection	James Madison
11	November 24, 1787	The Utility of the Union in Respect to Commercial Relations and a Navy	Alexander Hamilton
12	November 27, 1787	The Utility of the Union In Respect to Revenue	Alexander Hamilton
13	November 28, 1787	Advantage of the Union in Respect to Economy in Government	Alexander Hamilton
14	November 30, 1787	Objections to the Proposed Constitution From Extent of Territory Answered	James Madison
15	December 1, 1787	The Insufficiency of the Present Confederation to Preserve the Union	Alexander Hamilton
16	December 4, 1787	The Same Subject Continued: The Insufficiency of the Present Confederation to Preserve the Union	Alexander Hamilton
17	December 5, 1787	The Same Subject Continued: The Insufficiency of the Present Confederation to Preserve the Union	Alexander Hamilton
18	December 7, 1787	The Same Subject Continued: The Insufficiency of the Present Confederation to Preserve the Union	James Madison
19	December 8, 1787	The Same Subject Continued: The Insufficiency of the Present Confederation to Preserve the Union	James Madison
20	December 11, 1787	The Same Subject Continued: The Insufficiency of the Present Confederation to Preserve the Union	James Madison
21	December 12, 1787	Other Defects of the Present Confederation	Alexander Hamilton
22	December 14, 1787	The Same Subject Continued: Other Defects of the Present Confederation	Alexander Hamilton
23	December 18, 1787	The Necessity of a Government as Energetic as the One Proposed to the Preservation of the Union	Alexander Hamilton
24	December 19, 1787	The Powers Necessary to the Common Defense Further Considered	Alexander Hamilton
25	December 21, 1787	The Same Subject Continued: The Powers Necessary to the Common Defense Further Considered	Alexander Hamilton
26	December 22, 1787	The Idea of Restraining the Legislative Authority in Regard to the Common Defense Considered	Alexander Hamilton
27	December 25, 1787	The Same Subject Continued: The Idea of Restraining the Legislative Authority in Regard to the Common Defense Considered	Alexander Hamilton
28	December 26, 1787	The Same Subject Continued: The Idea of Restraining the Legislative Authority in Regard to the Common Defense Considered	Alexander Hamilton
29	January 9, 1788	Concerning the Militia	Alexander Hamilton
30	December 28, 1787	Concerning the General Power of Taxation	Alexander Hamilton
31	January 1, 1788	The Same Subject Continued: Concerning the General Power of Taxation	Alexander Hamilton
32	January 2, 1788	The Same Subject Continued: Concerning the General Power of Taxation	Alexander Hamilton
33	January 2, 1788	The Same Subject Continued: Concerning the General Power of Taxation	Alexander Hamilton
34	January 5, 1788	The Same Subject Continued: Concerning the General Power of Taxation	Alexander Hamilton
35	January 5, 1788	The Same Subject Continued: Concerning the General Power of Taxation	Alexander Hamilton
36	January 8, 1788	The Same Subject Continued: Concerning the General Power of Taxation	Alexander Hamilton
37	January 11, 1788	Concerning the Difficulties of the Convention in Devising a Proper Form of Government	James Madison
38	January 12, 1788	The Same Subject Continued, and the Incoherence of the Objections to the New Plan Exposed	James Madison
39	January 16, 1788	The Conformity of the Plan to Republican Principles	James Madison
40	January 18, 1788	The Powers of the convention to Form a Mixed Government Examined and Sustained	James Madison
41	January 19, 1788	General View of the Powers Conferred by the Constitution	James Madison
42	January 22, 1788	The Powers Conferred by the Constitution Further Considered	James Madison
43	January 23, 1788	The Same Subject Continued: The Powers Conferred by the Constitution Further Considered	James Madison
44	January 25, 1788	Restrictions on the Authority of the Several States	James Madison
45	January 26, 1788	The Alleged Danger From the Powers of the Union to the State Governments Considered	James Madison
46	January 29, 1788	The Influence of the State and Federal Governments Compared	James Madison
47	January 30, 1788	The Particular Structure of the New Government and the Distribution of Power Among Its Different Parts	James Madison
48	February 1, 1788	These Departments Should Not Be So Far Separated as to Have No Constitutional Control Over Each Other	James Madison
49	February 2, 1788	Method of Guarding Against the Encroachments of Any One Department of Government	James Madison (Note: One of twelve disputed papers (Nos. 49–58 and 62–63) to which both Madison and Hamilton laid claim. Modern scholarly consensus leans towards Madison as the author of all twelve, and he is so credited in this table.)
50	February 5, 1788	Periodic Appeals to the People Considered	James Madison
51	February 6, 1788	The Structure of the Government Must Furnish the Proper Checks and Balances Between the Different Departments	James Madison
52	February 8, 1788	The House of Representatives	James Madison
53	February 9, 1788	The Same Subject Continued: The House of Representatives	James Madison
54	February 12, 1788	The Apportionment of Members Among the States	James Madison
55	February 13, 1788	The Total Number of the House of Representatives	James Madison
56	February 16, 1788	The Same Subject Continued: The Total Number of the House of Representatives	James Madison
57	February 19, 1788	The Alleged Tendency of the New Plan to Elevate the Few at the Expense of the Many	James Madison
58	February 20, 1788	Objection That The Number of Members Will Not Be Augmented as the Progress of Population Demands Considered	James Madison
59	February 22, 1788	Concerning the Power of Congress to Regulate the Election of Members	Alexander Hamilton
60	February 23, 1788	The Same Subject Continued: Concerning the Power of Congress to Regulate the Election of Members	Alexander Hamilton
61	February 26, 1788	The Same Subject Continued: Concerning the Power of Congress to Regulate the Election of Members	Alexander Hamilton
62	February 27, 1788	The Senate	James Madison
63	March 1, 1788	The Senate Continued	James Madison
64	March 5, 1788	The Powers of the Senate	John Jay
65	March 7, 1788	The Powers of the Senate Continued	Alexander Hamilton
66	March 8, 1788	Objections to the Power of the Senate To Set as a Court for Impeachments Further Considered	Alexander Hamilton
67	March 11, 1788	The Executive Department	Alexander Hamilton
68	March 12, 1788	The Mode of Electing the President	Alexander Hamilton
69	March 14, 1788	The Real Character of the Executive	Alexander Hamilton
70	March 15, 1788	The Executive Department Further Considered	Alexander Hamilton
71	March 18, 1788	The Duration in Office of the Executive	Alexander Hamilton
72	March 19, 1788	The Same Subject Continued, and Re-Eligibility of the Executive Considered	Alexander Hamilton
73	March 21, 1788	The Provision For The Support of the Executive, and the Veto Power	Alexander Hamilton
74	March 25, 1788	The Command of the Military and Naval Forces, and the Pardoning Power of the Executive	Alexander Hamilton
75	March 26, 1788	The Treaty Making Power of the Executive	Alexander Hamilton
76	April 1, 1788	The Appointing Power of the Executive	Alexander Hamilton
77	April 2, 1788	The Appointing Power Continued and Other Powers of the Executive Considered	Alexander Hamilton
78	May 28, 1788 (book); June 14, 1788 (newspaper)	The Judiciary Department	Alexander Hamilton
79	May 28, 1788 (book); June 18, 1788 (newspaper)	The Judiciary Continued	Alexander Hamilton
80	June 21, 1788	The Powers of the Judiciary	Alexander Hamilton
81	June 25, 1788; June 28, 1788	The Judiciary Continued, and the Distribution of the Judicial Authority	Alexander Hamilton
82	July 2, 1788	The Judiciary Continued	Alexander Hamilton
83	July 5, 1788; July 9, 1788; July 12, 1788	The Judiciary Continued in Relation to Trial by Jury	Alexander Hamilton
84	July 16, 1788; July 26, 1788; August 9, 1788	Certain General and Miscellaneous Objections to the Constitution Considered and Answered	Alexander Hamilton
85	August 13, 1788; August 16, 1788	Concluding Remarks	Alexander Hamilton

=== Calendar view ===
	October 1787
Su	Mo	Tu	We	Th	Fr	Sa
	1	2	3	4	5	6
7	8	9	10	11	12	13
14	15	16	17	18	19	20
21	22	23	24	25	26	27
28	29	30	31

	November 1787
Su	Mo	Tu	We	Th	Fr	Sa
				1	2	3
4	5	6	7	8	9	10
11	12	13	14	15	16	17
18	19	20	21	22	23	24
25	26	27	28	29	30

	December 1787
Su	Mo	Tu	We	Th	Fr	Sa
						1
2	3	4	5	6	7	8
9	10	11	12	13	14	15
16	17	18	19	20	21	22
23	24	25	26	27	28	29
30	31

	January 1788
Su	Mo	Tu	We	Th	Fr	Sa
		1	2^{+}	3	4	5^{+}
6	7	8	9	10	11	12
13	14	15	16	17	18	19
20	21	22	23	24	25	26
27	28	29	30	31

	February 1788
Su	Mo	Tu	We	Th	Fr	Sa
					1	2
3	4	5	6	7	8	9
10	11	12	13	14	15	16
17	18	19	20	21	22	23
24	25	26	27	28	29

	March 1788
Su	Mo	Tu	We	Th	Fr	Sa
						1
2	3	4	5	6	7	8
9	10	11	12	13	14	15
16	17	18	19	20	21	22
23	24	25	26	27	28	29
30	31

	April 1788
Su	Mo	Tu	We	Th	Fr	Sa
		1	2	3	4	5
6	7	8	9	10	11	12
13	14	15	16	17	18	19
20	21	22	23	24	25	26
27	28	29	30

	May 1788
Su	Mo	Tu	We	Th	Fr	Sa
				1	2	3
4	5	6	7	8	9	10
11	12	13	14	15	16	17
18	19	20	21	22	23	24
25	26	27	28	29	30	31

	June 1788
Su	Mo	Tu	We	Th	Fr	Sa
1	2	3	4	5	6	7
8	9	10	11	12	13	14
15	16	17	18	19	20	21
22	23	24	25	26	27	28
29	30

	July 1788
Su	Mo	Tu	We	Th	Fr	Sa
		1	2	3	4	5
6	7	8	9	10	11	12
13	14	15	16	17	18	19
20	21	22	23	24	25	26
27	28	29	30	31

	August 1788
Su	Mo	Tu	We	Th	Fr	Sa
					1	2
3	4	5	6	7	8	9
10	11	12	13	14	15	16
17	18	19	20	21	22	23
24	25	26	27	28	29	30
31

== In popular culture ==
The purposes and authorship of The Federalist Papers were prominently highlighted in the lyrics of "Non-Stop", the finale of Act One in the 2015 Broadway musical Hamilton, written by Lin-Manuel Miranda.

The HBO historical miniseries titled "John Adams," authored by Kirk Ellis, depicts the controversies associated with the ratification of the United States Constitution and reflects on the historical epoch when The Federalist Papers emerged and were circulated in the states.

An educational website called Annenberg Classroom reviews both authorship and influence of the essays as well as their relevancy to understanding the United States Constitution in contemporary politics.

Among different programs offered by the Library of Congress are those featuring lectures about The Federalist Papers due to the crucial importance of the essays in publicizing the Constitution.

Public affairs programs of C-SPAN channel have paid attention to The Federalist Papers as a result of interviews and panel discussions dedicated to the essays' meaning for Americans.

The PBS documentary television series The American Revolution by director Ken Burns is primarily about the intellectual beginnings of the American Revolution and contribution of The Federalist Papers to the development and ratification of the Constitution.

== See also ==
- Bibliography of the United States Constitution
- American philosophy
- The Anti-Federalist Papers
- The Complete Anti-Federalist
- List of pseudonyms used in the American Constitutional debates

== General and cited references ==
- Adair, Douglass (1974). "The Disputed Federalist Papers". Fame and the Founding Fathers. Indianapolis: Liberty Fund.
- Mosteller, Frederick; Wallace, David L. (2012). Applied Bayesian and Classical Inference: The Case of The Federalist Papers. Springer Science & Business Media. ISBN 978-1-4612-5256-6. Updated 2nd ed., originally published as Mosteller, Frederick; Wallace, David L. (June 1963). "Inference in an Authorship Problem". Journal of the American Statistical Association. 58 (302): 275–309. JSTOR 2283270.
- Furtwangler, Albert (1984). The Authority of Publius: A Reading of the Federalist Papers. Ithaca, New York: Cornell Univ. Press. ISBN 978-0-8014-9339-3.
- Wills, Gary. Explaining America: The Federalist. Garden City, NJ: 1981. ISBN 978-0140298390.
