= Federalist No. 85 =

Final Federalist Paper, by Alexander Hamilton

- Alexander Hamilton, author of Federalist No. 85
- Author: Alexander Hamilton
- Original title: Concluding Remarks
- Language: English
- Publisher: The Independent Journal, New York Packet, The Daily Advertiser
- Publication date: August 13 and 16, 1788
- Publication place: United States
- Media type: Newspaper
- Preceded by: Federalist No. 84
- Followed by: None

Federalist No. 85 is an essay by Alexander Hamilton, the eighty-fifth and last of The Federalist Papers. It was published on August 13 and 16, 1788, under the pseudonym Publius, the name under which all The Federalist papers were published. The title is "Concluding Remarks".

== Overview ==
Federalist No. 85 begins with Publius quoting Federalist No. 1, stating that two points within the first essay have never been directly addressed. The first point was the resemblance of the proposed government's constitution to New York's state constitution while the second point was the added security and safety of the nation regarding invasion, liberty, and property. Although these points were not given their own respective essays, Publius stated that the issues had been thoroughly exhausted in prior works. Publius continued by saying that the "pretended" defects of the proposed government: the re-eligibility of the executive, the want of a council, the omission of a bill of rights, and the omission of a provision respecting the liberty of the press, were all characteristics of the New York constitution. The advantageous New Yorkers who attacked the proposed federal constitution while claiming to be adherent admirers of the New York government were thus found to be either hypocritical in their position or insincere in their admiration of their state.

Publius continued by addressing the issue of additional security. By doing so, the essay essentially summarized the overarching points of the previous works. The Union gains additional security through its strength and adherence to preservation. Because the proposed governments plan imposes restraints upon local and state factions and insurrections, it weakens the ability of a few or single powerful individuals to influence the overall government; it disbands the confederation and institutes a hardened alliance of unity between the states, thus extinguishing the real possibility of states leaving and commencing wars with each other; assures a republican form of government for all and excludes the idea of nobility and title; and solidly ferments the protection of liberties from state governments.

Publius declared that he had successfully finished the purpose with his work. To his knowledge, he had explained and defended the proposed government from every inquiry and objection against it and briefly dissected the reasons and purposes for its ratification. The argument then turned to the constitution's imperfect nature. The essay asks why adopt a flawed document when it could be revised and amended first and then ratified later. Publius responded by declaring it imprudent to prolong national affairs for the irrational pursuit of perfection. He stated:

"I never expect to see a perfect work from imperfect man. The result of the deliberation of all collective bodies, must necessarily be a compound as well of the errors and prejudices, as of the good sense and wisdom of the individuals of whom they are composed. The compacts which are to embrace thirteen distinct states, in a common bond of amity and union, must as necessarily be a compromise of the dissimilar interests and inclinations. How can perfection spring from such materials?"

For those with serious intent to amend the proposed constitution, it would subsequently be easier to amend the document after its ratification rather than prior. With every amendment added before its ratification, every state must revise and agree upon these changes. Little progress would be made, and compromise from the states would obscure the amendments' original intent. However, if any amendment were proposed after ratification, there would be no compromise on its language; it would either be accepted or denied. Publius quoted Scottish Enlightenment philosopher, David Hume, the excerpt saying:

"to balance a large state or society (says he) whether monarchical or republican, on general laws, is a work of so great difficulty, that no human genius, however comprehensive, is able by the mere dint of reason and reflection, to effect it. The judgments of many must unite in the work: EXPERIENCE must guide their labour: TIME must bring it to perfection: and the FEELING OF inconveniences must correct the mistakes which they inevitably fall into, in their first trials and experiments."

The overall changes and flaws of any work come into check from time and experience of the system rather than the passionate pursuits of imprudent men. In closing, Publius said that "a nation without a national government is an awful spectacle", and any other proposals are engineered by "powerful individuals" who seek to remain nationally weak to keep their local and regional power.
