= Federalist No. 54 =

Federalist Paper by James Madison on Apportionment of Representatives

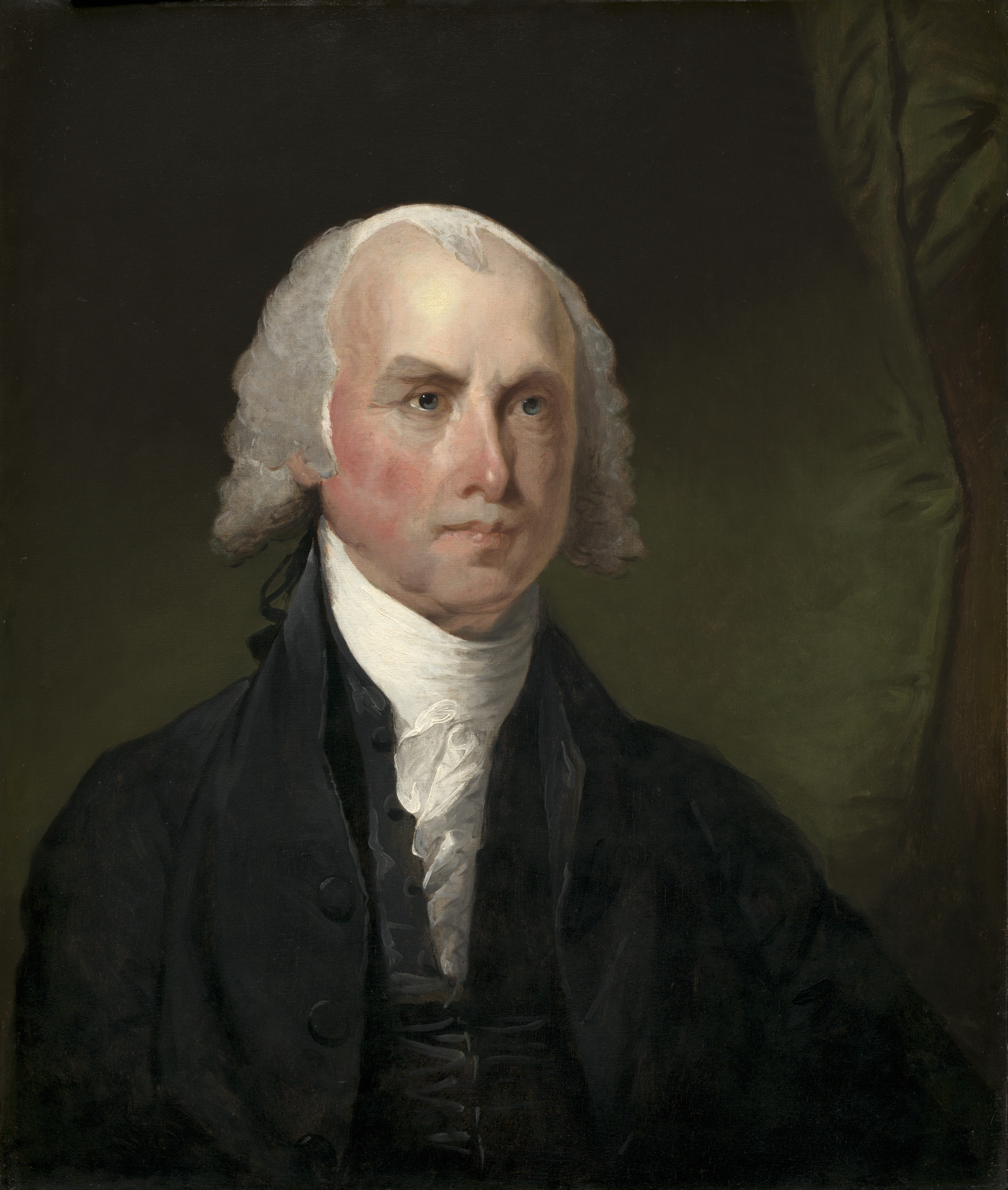
- James Madison, author of Federalist No. 54
- Author: James Madison
- Original title: The Apportionment of Members Among the States
- Language: English
- Series: The Federalist
- Publisher: New York Packet
- Publication date: February 12, 1788
- Publication place: United States
- Media type: Newspaper
- Preceded by: Federalist No. 53
- Followed by: Federalist No. 55

Federalist Paper No. 54 is an essay by James Madison, the fifty-fourth of The Federalist Papers. It was first published by The New York Packet on February 12, 1788 under the pseudonym Publius, the name under which all The Federalist papers were published.

Titled, "The Apportionment of Members Among the States", the paper discusses how seats in the United States House of Representatives are apportioned among the states and compares the distinct reasons for apportionment for taxes and for people. Madison proposes that the "opposite interests" of states to both increase their population counts for purposes of representation and to decrease the counts for purposes of taxation would lead them to contribute to an accurate census.

The primary concern of the paper regards the inclusion of slaves in the proposed apportionment. Madison states that slaves are property as well as people and therefore require some degree of representation, which in the Constitution was to be three out of every five slaves, or 3/5 of the total number of slaves in a state. Madison thereby defends the Three-fifths Compromise that was adopted by the Constitutional Convention but which remained controversial and a source of friction between the states and political parties (it was annulled by the Fourteenth Amendment).

Federalist No. 54 was erroneously attributed to John Jay in Alexander Hamilton's enumeration of the authors of the various Federalist Papers. Madison was Hamilton's major collaborator, writing 29 of the papers, although Madison himself asserted that he had written more. A known error in Hamilton's list, that he incorrectly ascribed No. 54 to John Jay when in fact Jay wrote No. 64, provides evidence for Madison's claim. Nearly all of the statistical studies show that the disputed papers were written by Madison, including No. 54.

== Background ==
Prior to the Constitution, the Articles of Confederation stated that the apportionment of taxation was based on the land value in each state, causing states to depreciate the value of their land so they weren't burdened with the amount of taxes that they had to pay. To prevent states from manipulating the numbers, Madison wanted to create a system where both taxes and the number of representatives were based on the population, so that if a state claimed too large of a population to gain more seats in the House of Representatives, they would have to pay higher taxes. While this proposal found support, it led to a problem: the slave states had large populations of slaves, who were ineligible to vote; if they were counted in the population, the slave states would have more seats in the House.

A national convention was assembled for May 1787, to revise the Articles of Confederation. The problem of how to count slaves was a major issue. Southerners wanted slaves to count fully because it would increase the number of representatives allotted to slave-holding states. On the other hand, northern delegates wanted the slaves not to count. As they saw it, slaves were not free citizens, and were considered mere property by their masters. After a long deliberation, Madison came to a compromise that counted slaves as three-fifths of a person.

The Three-Fifths Clause is perhaps the most misunderstood provision of the U.S. Constitution because the clause provides that the representation in Congress will be based on "the whole Number of free Persons" and "the three fifths of all other persons". The other persons were slaves. This provision declared that the slave states would get extra representation in congress for their slaves, even though those states treated slaves purely as property. The provision was not directly about race, but about status and allocation of political power. Free African American people were counted the same way as whites. The clause provided a mathematical formula that allowed for the allocation of representatives in Congress that factored in the slave population. No slaves could vote in the country, and the clause did not even provide a voice for slaves. This was about the distribution of political power among the states

== Three-Fifths Compromise ==
The Three-Fifths Compromise was proposed by James Wilson in 1787 in order to gain Southern support for the new framework of government by guaranteeing that the South would be strongly represented in the House of Representatives. Naturally, it was more popular in the South than in the North.

In Article I, Section II, Clause III of the United States Constitution, the Three-Fifths Compromise is stated as:

"Representatives and direct taxes shall be apportioned among the several states which may be included in this Union, according to their respective numbers, which shall be determined by adding to the whole number of free persons, including those bound to service for a term of years, and excluding Indians not taxed, three fifths of all other persons."

== Madison's arguments ==
In the 54th Federalist Paper, James Madison reveals his defenses and arguments behind a portion of the United States Constitution known as the Three-Fifths Compromise. Madison created the 54th Federalist Paper in order to influence the American public that the compromise was in fact a successful solution to the differences between the North and the South regions. Although Madison was a strong supporter of the Constitution, he personally felt conflicted about the concept of slavery, which inevitably left him feeling obligated to defend the three-fifths rule. Throughout the Federalist 54, Madison recognizes that the lives of the slaves are initially considered property under the law, because of the slaves compelling labor, constant trade, and in the end, their liberty was constrained, much like property. Essentially, Madison argues that the law protects the lives of slaves as property, and as a person because in reality slaves could receive punishment for the harm of others. Madison continues to argue through the content of the 54th Federalist Paper, that by the defense of the Constitution and in support of the Three-Fifths Compromise, that slaves should be represented with mixed characteristics, as both property and person.

== Publication ==
Written by Alexander Hamilton, James Madison and John Jay, Federalist Paper No. 54 was published on February 12, 1788 under the pseudonym Publius, the name under which all The Federalist Papers were published. Alexander Hamilton was the force behind the project of the Federalist Papers, and was responsible for recruiting James Madison and John Jay to write with him as Publius. Two others were considered, Gouverneur Morris and William Duer. Morris rejected the offer, and Hamilton didn't like Duer's work. Even still, Duer managed to publish three articles in defense of the Constitution under the name Philo-Publius, or "Friend of Publius." The Federalist Papers were written in an attempt to get the New York citizens to ratify the United States Constitution in 1787, but the specific issue at hand for No. 54 was the way which the seats in the US House of Representatives would be apportioned among the states.

== See also ==
- United States congressional apportionment
