= Federalist No. 12 =

Federalist Paper by Alexander Hamilton

- Alexander Hamilton, author of Federalist No. 12
- Author: Alexander Hamilton
- Original title: The Utility of the Union In Respect to Revenue
- Language: English
- Series: The Federalist
- Publisher: New York Packet
- Publication date: November 27, 1787
- Publication place: United States
- Media type: Newspaper
- Preceded by: Federalist No. 11
- Followed by: Federalist No. 13

Federalist No. 12 is an essay by Alexander Hamilton, the twelfth of The Federalist Papers. It was first published in The New York Packet on November 27, 1787 under the pseudonym Publius, the name under which all The Federalist papers were published. It is titled "The Utility of the Union In Respect to Revenue".

== Summary ==
In Federalist 12, Hamilton argues that the formation of the union will lead to greater wealth. The government, by establishing currency, would encourage industry and all Americans would enjoy the benefits. Hamilton continues by arguing that there is no rivalry between commerce and agriculture – rather each benefits when the other prospers. Taxes should be levied on commerce and the union will be more efficient than the states at collecting revenue. In fact, the article predicts that revenue will triple with the new federal government administering tax collection. The states had been unable to establish an adequate way to collect taxes. Hamilton claims that direct taxation is not a reality for the new government. Instead, taxes should be levied on imports and exports, mainly on imports. Hamilton also suggests that if the federal government administers tax collection instead of leaving the task to states, it will reduce the amount of resources needed to ensure that the tax is not being evaded. It will be easier for the federal government to protect one border – the Atlantic coast – than it would be for each state to protect its borders. A few ships stationed outside of the Union's ports would ensure the collection of duties. Hamilton concludes that funding the government is essential and if Americans fail to do so then the Revolution itself will have been in vain.
