= Federalist No. 11 =

Federalist Paper by Alexander Hamilton

- Alexander Hamilton, author of Federalist No. 11
- Author: Alexander Hamilton
- Original title: The Utility of the Union in Respect to Commercial Relations and a Navy
- Language: English
- Series: The Federalist
- Publisher: The Independent Journal
- Publication date: November 23, 1787
- Publication place: United States
- Media type: Newspaper
- Preceded by: Federalist No. 10
- Followed by: Federalist No. 12

Federalist No. 11 is an essay by Alexander Hamilton, the eleventh of The Federalist Papers. It was first published in The Independent Journal (New York) on November 23, 1787 under the pseudonym Publius, the name under which all The Federalist papers were published. It is titled "The Utility of the Union in Respect to Commercial Relations and a Navy".

== Summary ==
The essay begins with Publius admitting that the "adventurous spirit" of America has already made the European countries uneasy about engaging in trade. Publius explains that continued uneasiness will deprive the States of "active commerce." Publius then posits that a Union would counteract that problem by making prohibitory regulations that are uniform throughout the states, thus requiring foreign countries to negotiate with the Union as a whole and bid against each other for trading rights.

Publius then moves to discuss the importance of establishing a federal navy. This would increase the Union's ability to gain access and control the trade opportunities of the West Indies, thus allowing the Union to set prices and control all European trade in the Americas, putting the Union in a commanding position over foreign trade. This "active commerce" in controlling trade, as opposed to "passive commerce," reflects the American spirit.

Publius further emphasizes not just the importance of controlling foreign trade, but also that a Union would allow "an unrestrained intercourse between the States themselves." The naval presence will allow the States to protect trade among themselves and help promote mutual gains. Without a Union between the States, trade would be less successful; "would be fettered, interrupted, and narrowed by a multiplicity of causes."

== Background ==
Federalist Papers No. 11 addresses the necessity of a unified regulation of trade among states under the federal government. At the time, congress did not have the power to regulate the commerce and trade between states or foreign countries. Also, because of the status quo, foreign countries would not agree with individual unnecessary trade agreements with states. Alexander Hamilton saw the necessity of a common regulation to prevent future consequences the country may face when engaging in commerce. He also points out that by having a unified country under the federal regulation, it will create competition between foreign countries for the right to trade. This idea is then later put into effect by stating, "To regulate Commerce with foreign Nations, and among the several States, and with the Indian Tribes" in the constitution also known as the commerce clause.

== Analysis ==
It has been debated in the past regarding the meaning and intent in the regulation of commerce such as in the case of United States v. Lopez. In this case, the Supreme Court ruled that Congress had exceeded its constitutional authority under the Commerce Clause when it passed a law prohibiting gun possession in local school zones. One reason was that the regulation of guns in school would not significantly affect interstate commerce and the Supreme Court found it unconstitutional. Some have also argued that the "regulation of commerce" meant the regulation of "gainful activity" and not necessarily goods.

== The Navy and Commerce ==
Alexander Hamilton emphasizes the necessity of a federal navy throughout the paper. He states, "A navy of the United States, as it would embrace the resources of all, is an object far less remote than a navy of any single State or partial confederacy…". He writes about the convenience and many benefits of a federal navy compared to several navies belonging to each state independently. It would allow the transport of a variety of goods instead of specific goods from separate states.

The potential power that the navy would possess causes Hamilton to urge the creation of a unified federal navy. By maintaining a federal navy, he saw that it can be of use to protect and maintain their neutrality in commerce. According to Hamilton, "A nation, despicable by its weakness, forfeits even the privilege of being neutral." He recognizes that the use of the navy would allow protection from foreign countries' demands that would otherwise ruin U.S. commerce.
