= Federalist No. 62 =

Federalist Paper by James Madison about the Senate

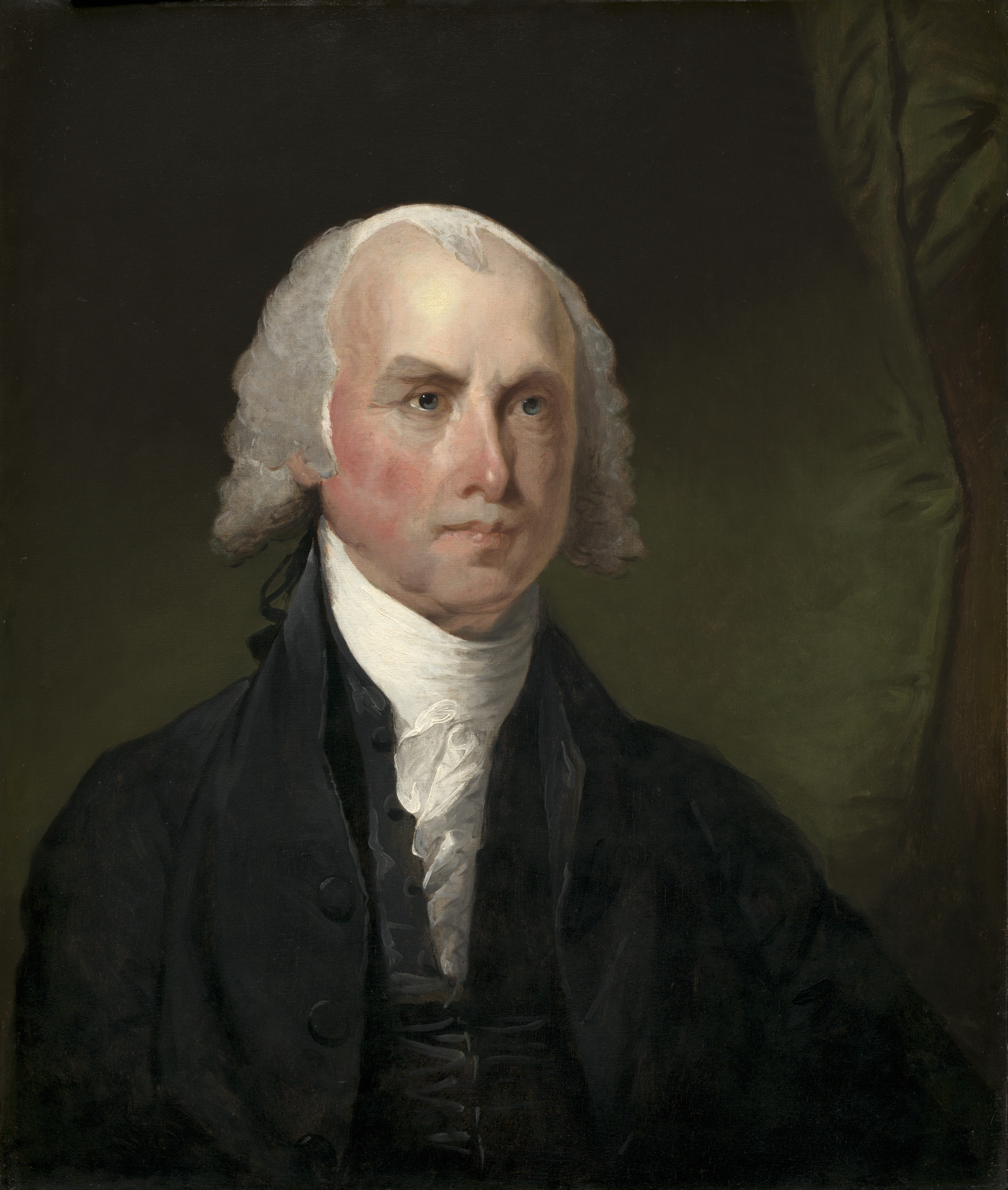
- James Madison, author of Federalist No. 62
- Author: James Madison
- Original title: The Senate
- Language: English
- Series: The Federalist
- Publisher: New York Packet
- Publication date: February 27, 1788
- Publication place: United States
- Media type: Newspaper
- Preceded by: Federalist No. 61
- Followed by: Federalist No. 63

Federalist No. 62 is an essay written by James Madison as the sixty-second of The Federalist Papers, a series of essays initiated by Alexander Hamilton arguing for the ratification of the United States Constitution. It was first published in The New York Packet on February 27, 1788, under the pseudonym Publius. Federalist No. 62 is the first of two essays by Madison detailing, and seeking to justify, the organization of the United States Senate, and is titled "The Senate".

== Purpose ==
The purpose of Federalist No. 62 is "defending" the structure and design of the Senate. Five key considerations are raised, of which three and a part of the fourth are discussed in Federalist No. 62. Madison's thoughts on this subject are completed in Federalist No. 63:

1. The qualifications of senators (thirty years of age or older/citizen for nine years),
2. the appointment of Senators by the state legislatures – later changed to direct popular vote by the 17th Amendment in 1913,
3. the equality of representation in the Senate, and
4. the number of senators.

=== Proposed qualifications of a member of the Senate ===
A member of the Senate must be thirty years of age and have been an American citizen for nine years while a Member of the House of Representatives is required to be 25 years of age and needs to have been a citizen for seven years. James Madison's reasoning for this is that with age comes more wisdom and a lower chance of being affected by emotion when making decisions. The reason for the longer period of citizenship is to protect the government from any influence that other countries could have, caused by appointing those who have not been in America for long enough to understand the values and interests of the people. These requirements are the same today.

=== Method of appointing members of the Senate ===
Madison believed the Senate should be a method of connecting state and national government. Therefore, he proposed that senators be voted in by the State legislatures in order to keep the Senate exclusive to a well selected and qualified group of individuals while also effectively linking the two government groups. However, after passage of the Seventeenth Amendment in 1913, senators of each State are elected through popular vote by the residents of each State.

=== Equality of representation ===
The Senate is meant to regulate the power of the House of Representatives by giving equal power to every State in the Senate. This is accomplished by allowing each State two senators with one vote each, which counteracts the fact that the number of representatives per state is based on the population of the state. As Madison says, "the government ought to be founded on a mixture of the principles of proportional and equal representation". Due to this, each state has equal power in the Senate, which in turn protects less populous States from being overpowered by more populous States. Representatives are elected with the people's interests in mind, while senators are elected with the States' interests in mind. What this means is that when the House of Representatives votes to pass a law or bill it is then voted for in the Senate which leads to the passing of laws that cater to both the States and the people. This type of two-stage voting system keeps the House of Representatives from passing too many laws or from passing laws that possibly serve the interests of the people themselves.

== Modern analysis and reaction ==
Federalist No. 62 is generally not regarded as among the more important numbers of The Federalist. Today, however, Federalist No. 62 is subject to renewed interest because of its focus, along with Federalist Nos. 52, 53, 63, and 64, on the design of the United States Congress. In particular, scholars identify that Madison's arguments supporting equal representation in the Senate are contrary to the views he expressed at the Constitutional Convention. During the Constitutional Convention, Madison authored the Virginia Plan that proposed representation based on population for each state. Equal state suffrage was an idea that Madison fought against "tooth and nail." Yet, in Federalist No. 62 Madison "called the Senate a necessary compromise."
