= The Rage of Party =

2025 non-fiction book by George Owers

- Author: George Owers
- Publisher: Constable
- Publication date: 4 September 2025
- Publication place: United Kingdom
- Pages: 576
- ISBN: 978-1408719091

The Rage of Party: How Whig Versus Tory Made Modern Britain is a popular history book written by George Owers, and published by Constable in 2025. It recounts the Rage of Party, a tumultuous period in English politics between the Glorious Revolution and the death of Anne, Queen of Great Britain. The book was selected by The Times as one of the best books of 2025. Owers concludes that the competition between Whigs and Tories set the intellectual and cultural tone for the political arguments of the early twenty-first century.

== Reviews ==
The book has received many positive reviews. The historian Dominic Sandbrook commended Owers for "an impressive range of academic scholarship", his "mordant eye for eccentric details" and "an admirable sense of perspective". In The Daily Telegraph the commentator Tim Stanley wrote that Owers "[is] accomplished, funny, and does a clever job of implying comparison with the present without being obvious". For History Today Joseph Hone described the book as "tremendously entertaining" and "a heady cocktail of policy and personality". Writing in the New Statesman the historian Ronald Hutton was skeptical of Owers's conclusions, but praised the book for "[telling] this story, month by month, in all its complexity, never losing the bigger picture while making the details riveting". In The Spectator Clemmie Read argued that "Tories and Whigs map almost exactly on to the 'Somewheres' and 'Anywheres' identified by David Goodhart", concluding that "There could be no better time for a detailed and ambitious history of that period – especially one which is so entertaining".
