= 1722 British general election =

Election in Great Britain

- 19 March – 9 May 1722

All 558 seats in the House of Commons 280 seats needed for a majority

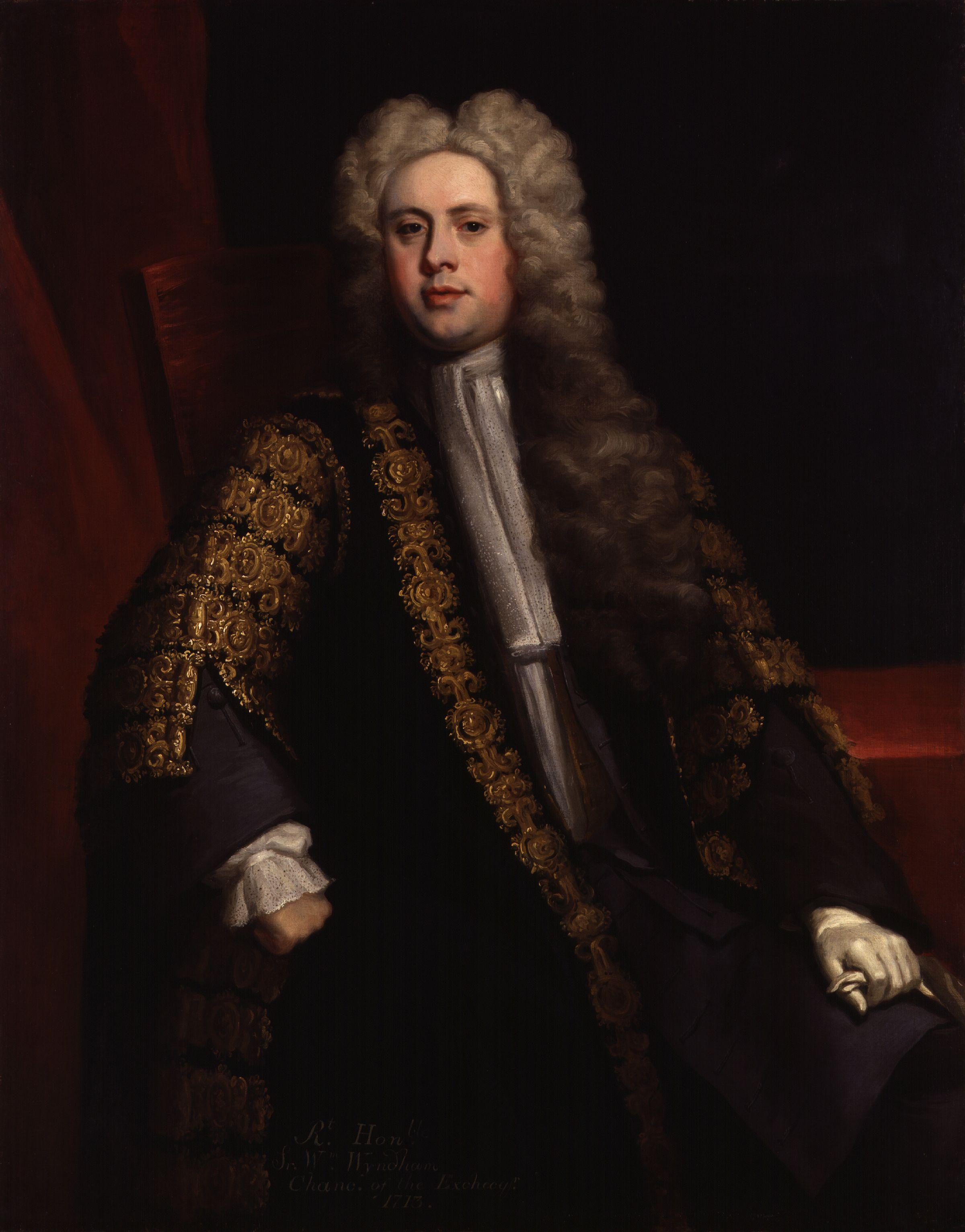
	First party	Second party
Leader	Robert Walpole	Sir William Wyndham
Party	Whig	Tory
Leader's seat	King's Lynn	Somerset
Seats won	389	169
Seat change	▲48	▼48
- Composition of the House of Commons after election
Prime Minister before election
Robert Walpole
Whig
Prime Minister after
election
Robert Walpole
Whig

The 1722 British general election elected members to serve in the House of Commons of the 6th Parliament of Great Britain. This was the fifth such election since the merger of the Parliament of England and the Parliament of Scotland in 1707. Thanks to the Septennial Act 1715, which swept away the maximum three-year life of a parliament created by the Meeting of Parliament Act 1694, it followed seven years after the previous election, that of 1715.

The election was fiercely fought, with contests taking place in more than half of the constituencies, which was unusual for the time. Despite the level of public involvement, however, with the Whigs having consolidated their control over virtually every branch of government, Walpole's party commanded almost a monopoly of electoral patronage, and was therefore able to increase its majority in Parliament even as its popular support fell.

In the midst of the election, word came from France of a Jacobite plot aimed at an imminent coup d'état. Led by Francis Atterbury, Bishop of Rochester, Lord North and Grey, and other Tory opponents of Walpole, this was later known as the "Atterbury Plot".

Previously election results had broadly reflected the opinion of at least the minority of adult males who had the vote, although the system had always been subject to the influence of corruption and patronage. However, now that one-party government had been established, those influences could be used systematically to ensure the governing party's victory. This election set the pattern for much of the rest of the eighteenth century; as partisan feeling began to decline during the years of the Whig oligarchy, the rigging of elections became ever easier, so that British governments could almost always guarantee victory.

== Summary of the constituencies ==
See 1796 British general election for details. The constituencies used were the same throughout the existence of the Parliament of Great Britain.

== Dates of election ==
The general election was held between 19 March 1722 and 9 May 1722. At this period elections did not take place at the same time in every constituency. The returning officer in each county or parliamentary borough fixed the precise date (see hustings for details of the conduct of the elections).

== Results ==

=== Seats summary ===
Parliamentary seats
Whig	69.7%
Tory	30.3%

== See also ==
- List of MPs elected in the British general election, 1722
- List of parliaments of Great Britain
