= British government in the 18th century =

Government of the Kingdom of Great Britain British Government
- Parliamentary monarchy
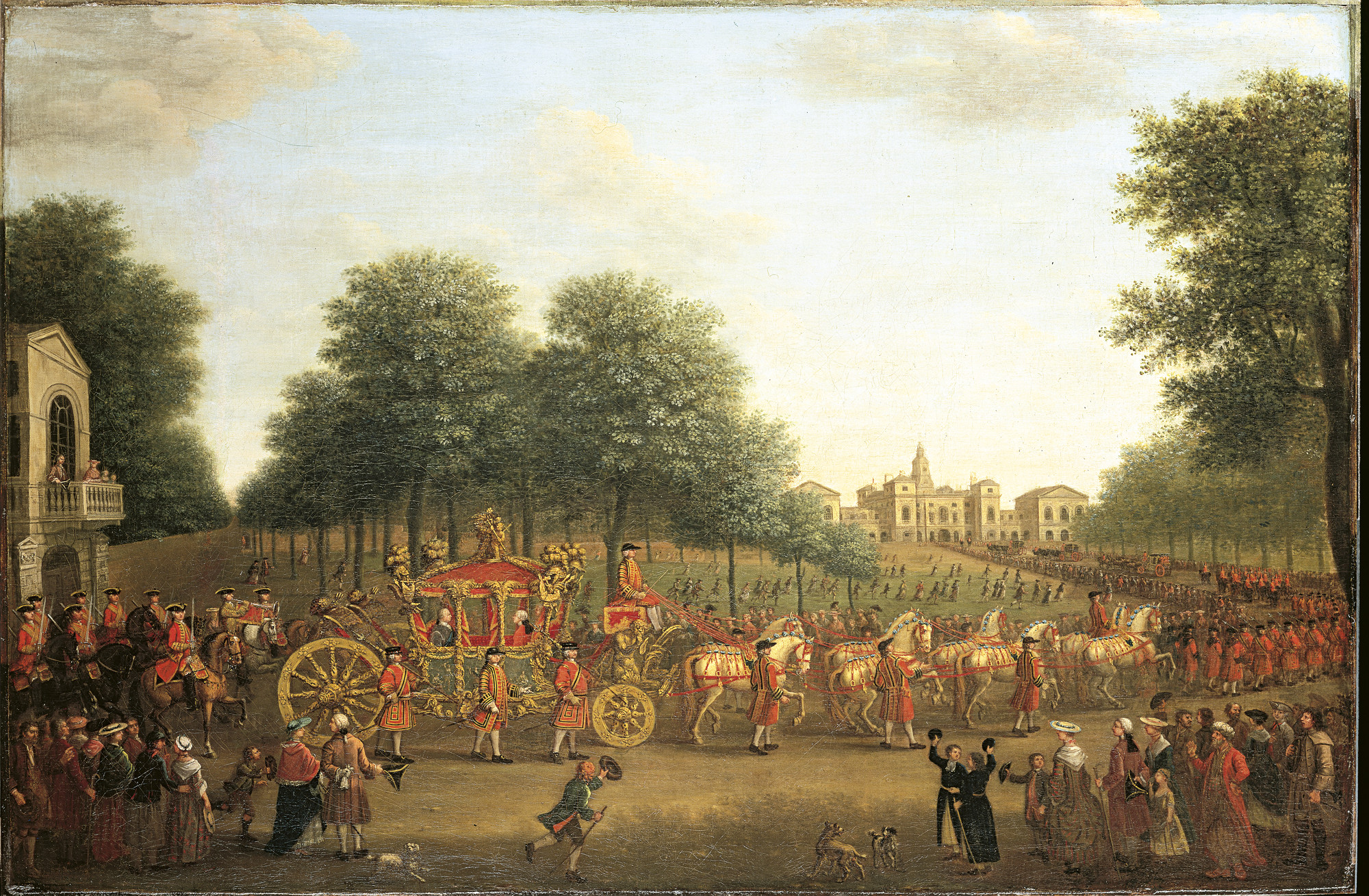
- George III's Procession to the Houses of Parliament
- Constitutional documents: Acts of Union 1707, Bill of Rights 1689
- State: Kingdom of Great Britain
- Country: Great Britain

The Crown
- Monarchs: Queen Anne; George I George II; George III
- Royal Prerogative: Appointment of ministers and peers dissolution of Parliament royal assent

Legislative branch
- Legislature: Parliament of Great Britain
- Speaker: Speaker of the House of Commons

Executive branch
- Head of Government (de facto): First Lord of the Treasury (informally: Prime Minister)
- Main body: Cabinet
- Head of State: The Monarch
- Key Ministers: Secretaries of State (Northern and Southern Departments)
- Financial Head: Chancellor of the Exchequer
- Appointed by: The Monarch (subject to parliamentary confidence)
- Headquarters: Downing Street (from 1735), Whitehall
- Main organ: Privy Council
- Departments: HM Treasury; Admiralty; Secretaries of State; Board of Trade

Judicial branch
- Court: High Court of Parliament (House of Lords)
- Senior Legal Officers: Lord High Chancellor; Lord Chief Justice
- Seat: Westminster Hall, London
- Common Law Courts: Court of King's Bench; Court of Common Pleas; Court of Exchequer

The British government in the 18th century had been marked by a massive curtailment of the Crown’s powers. The Crown lost the majority of its prerogatives and could no longer govern against the will of Parliament or without it. Although the monarch, as head of state, continued to hold is prerogative in foreign policy and the appointment of ministers, in practice he was increasingly dependent on parliamentary majorities.

To secure these majorities, the Crown and systematically manipulated the composition of both Houses of Parliament: in the House of Lords through the allocation of bishoprics, and in the House of Commons by exploiting local privileges and influencing voters in the constituencies. It was during this period that the modern British executive also took shape: the actual work of government shifted from the King’s Privy Council to the Cabinet. This development, combined with the need to administer the Exchequer effectively, led to the emergence of the office of Prime Minister in the first half of the century, with Robert Walpole regarded as its first holder.

== Background ==
Since the Glorious Revolution, the monarchy had been losing power to Parliament. The Bill of Rights and the Act of Settlement imposed firm legal constraints on the Crown. The king lost the right to determine the line of succession on his own. For the King, this meant that his rights to the throne were now explicitly subject to the law of Parliament. The principle of the inviolable divine right of kings was thus legally blocked. This blocking also prevented the king from revoking laws unilaterally without the consent of Parliament and challenging the proceedings and procedures of Parliament. To prevent the King from manipulating Parliament through the allocation of posts and funds, recipients of royal salaries or pensions were now barred from sitting in the House of Commons. With the Triennial Act of 1694 and the Septennial Act of 1716 the King was legally obliged to summon Parliament at regular intervals. At the same time, Parliament imposed permanent financial control on the Crown.

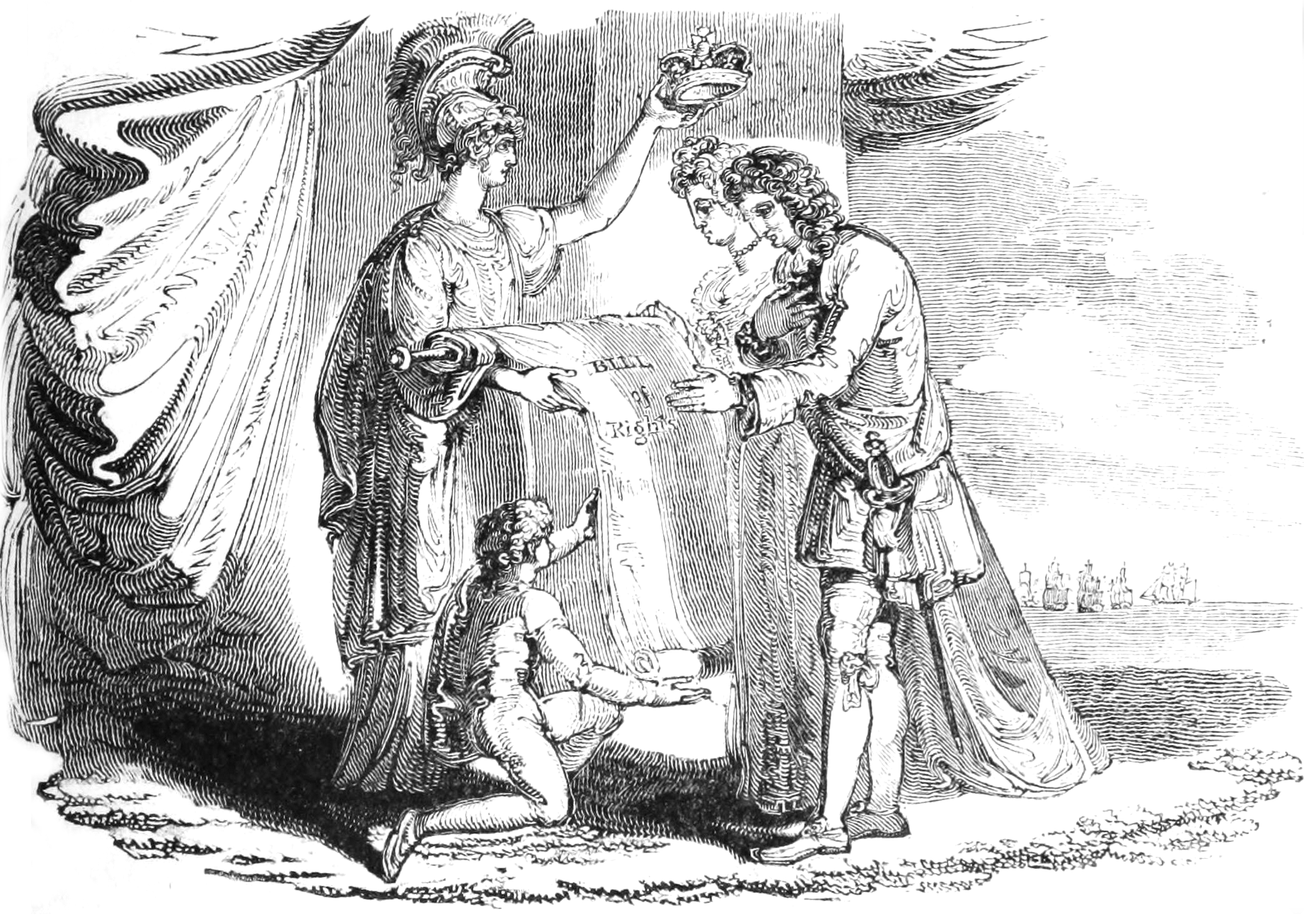
Allegorical engraving representing the 1689 Bill of Rights

The king also lost direct control over the judiciary and the executive. Judges could no longer be dismissed at the king’s whim if their rulings displeased the court; they now remained in office as long as they behaved correctly, and were thus independent. The king’s right to exempt individuals from compliance with certain laws was declared unlawful. The king was henceforth obliged to act on foreign policy matters only on the advice of his accredited ministers. At the same time, ministers could no longer shift the responsibility for their actions onto the king. The king lost the right to grant public offices, seats in Parliament or crown lands to foreign nationals. Furthermore, the king was not permitted to wage war in defence of foreign territories or to leave the country without the consent of Parliament. In treason trials, defendants were granted the right to a defence lawyer and to inspect the indictment in advance, which made it more difficult for the Crown to obtain convictions against the disaffected. At last the King no longer had the right to grant a royal pardon in order to block impeachment proceedings initiated by the House of Commons against his ministers.

== Branches ==
=== Legislative ===
Since both the House of Commons and the House of Lords could no longer be ignored, the Crown sought to gain control through the composition of both chambers. In the House of Lords, the Crown wielded considerable influence, even though it was largely a hereditary chamber. For most of the century, a large number of ministers were members of the House of Lords. This gave them the opportunity to elaborate on royal policy in great detail, for although they were highly dependent on court offices and royal favours, its members were far from acting merely as rubber stamps. The Crown exercised more effective control over those members who did not hold hereditary titles. This was ensured by the bishops and the representative Scottish peers. During Queen Anne’s reign, the former were appointed with some care regarding their suitability and their ecclesiastical disposition, although the ministers did their best to ensure that political reliability was not overlooked in the search for more spiritual qualities.

After her death, bishops were increasingly selected from the ranks of the Broad Churchmen, who were supporters of the Whigs and secured a solid bloc of reliable voters for the government. A clergyman who was critical of the crown therefore had little chance of being consecrated as a bishop. It was customary to assign a man becoming a bishop for the first time to a see where the income barely covered the expenses associated with the office. If he then proved himself reliable, he was transferred to a more prosperous diocese when the opportunity arose. Since it was clear that the consequences of disobedience would likely be fatal to future promotion, it is not surprising that the Crown could rely on the bishops’ votes.

To control the composition of the House of Commons, the Crown systematically exploited the historical anomalies of the electoral system. Since there was no legally standardized suffrage, the right to vote in the urban electoral districts, the boroughs, depended entirely on local privileges. This made the relatively small urban electorate an easy target for political manipulation, while the rural electorate in the counties could hardly be controlled due to its sheer size and independence. In addition to wealthy men who hoped to gain social advancement through the purchase of a seat, the government actively intervened in the system through the Treasury. Particularly in the port cities, the awarding of lucrative naval contracts or nominations for well-paid positions in the customs administration were deliberately used to cultivate a compliant and loyal electorate. Through the interplay of these various control mechanisms, the sovereignty of the House of Commons lay firmly in the hands of an elite minority: by the mid-18th century, the influence of just 51 members of the House of Lords and 55 influential MPs was sufficient to directly bring about or decisively influence the election of more than 190 members of the House of Commons. The system thus ensured that the supposed check on the Crown was primarily staffed by representatives of the aristocratic elite.

==== House of Commons ====
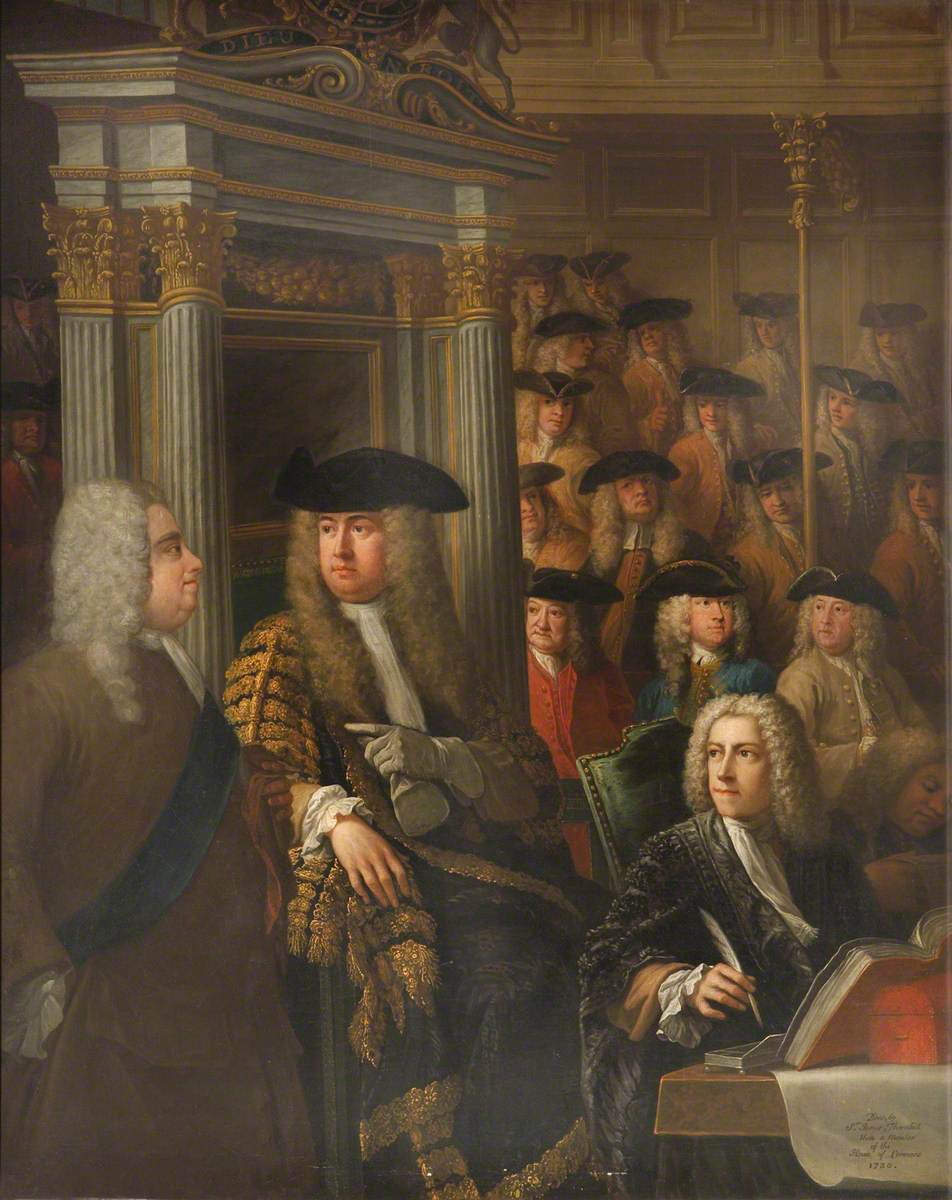
Speaker Arthur Onslow calling upon Robert Walpole to speak in the House of Commons

A general election was initiated solely by the monarch, who formally dissolved the existing Parliament. This was done by means of a royal proclamation under the Great Seal. According to the Forty Shilling Freeholder Act at the king’s command, the Lord Chancellor then issued official election orders, known as Writs of Election. These documents sent to local election officials throughout the country. The Elections were held at regular intervals in accordance with the Septennial Act of 1716, at least every seven years in case of death of the monarch or if he decided to do so.

Only men aged 21 and older who met the local property qualifications were eligible to vote. In the counties, these were the forty-shilling freeholders (men who owned land yielding an annual income of at least 40 shillings). In the towns, eligibility ranged from owning specific properties (burgages) to holding the status of a tax-paying citizen (Scot and Lot). A state voter registry did not exist for most of the century. It was not until 1780 that the local land tax records (Land Tax Duplicates) began to serve as the primary official verification document in the counties. In the towns, the historical corporate registers (Corporation Books) were used. In cases of doubt, the local returning officer made an immediate and final decision on eligibility. The right to stand for election was tied to a candidate's annual income. The Landed Property Qualification Act of 1711 set the minimum annual income at 600 pounds for a county seat and 300 pounds for a borough seat.

==== House of Lords ====
As part of Parliament, the House of Lords had the right to enact or repeal laws.All bills affecting the rights of the peerage had to originate in the House of Lords. The House of Commons was not permitted to make any amendments or additions to these bills. The House of Lords had the prerogative of proxy voting: With the king’s permission, a peer could appoint another lord as his proxy to vote on his behalf in his absence. Members of the House of Commons were prohibited from doing so, as they already acted as proxies for their constituents. Furthermore, every peer had the right to protest. If the House voted against a peer’s views, he could have his dissent, along with his reasons, recorded in the House’s journal.

In addition, the House of Lords served as the kingdom’s High Court. It was responsible for reviewing injustices and procedural errors committed by lower courts. In practice, this authority was severely limited by procedural rules, particularly by the writ of error. Every member of the House of Lords was entitled to this power, regardless of any legal training. With the exception of a small number of peers who were required to sit with the judicial members, most peers declined to exercise this privilege.

=== Executive ===
==== The Crown ====
Although the crown´s legislative powers had been reduced to an unused right of veto, the monarch was the head of the state. He retained the right to dissolve Parliament, appoint peers, and select and dismiss his ministers. The monarch was free to consult with anyone and to choose those to whom he wished to delegate executive power. In practice, this was constrained by the need to secure majorities in Parliament. Consequently, the monarch could only select his most important officials from the relatively small circle of men who held the key to parliamentary power. Although the monarch could not introduce new laws by proclamation, monarchs were not bound by parliamentary resolutions if their name was not expressly mentioned, unless such resolutions concerned the realm or served to suppress injustice or fraud.

The Crown held a particularly exclusive prerogative in foreign policy. The Crown alone could declare war or make peace. The Crown also had the prerogative to enter into alliances and treaties with foreign states. In this regard, the monarch’s proclamations had the force of law. Since the Crown had the right to declare war, she was also the head of the armed forces, which included all armaments, the conscription of soldiers, and the procurement of weapons by land and sea, as well as control over all depots, ammunition, fortresses, men of war, and public funds.

The British Monarchs in the 18th Century
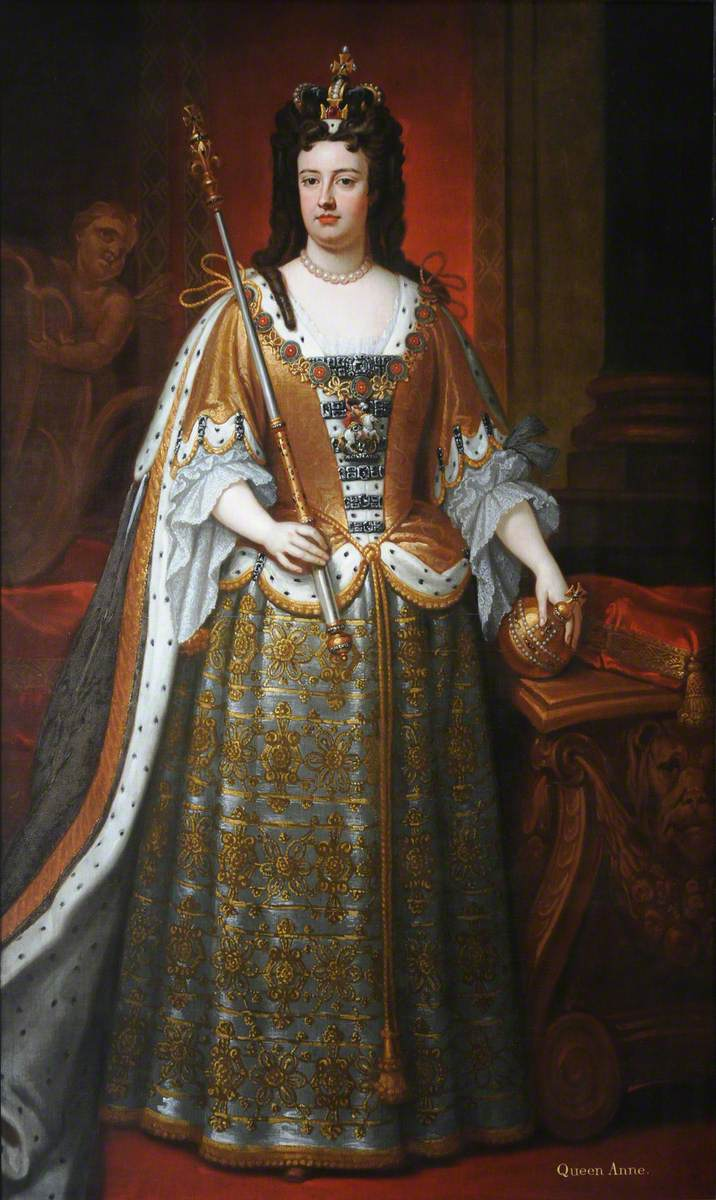
Queen Anne

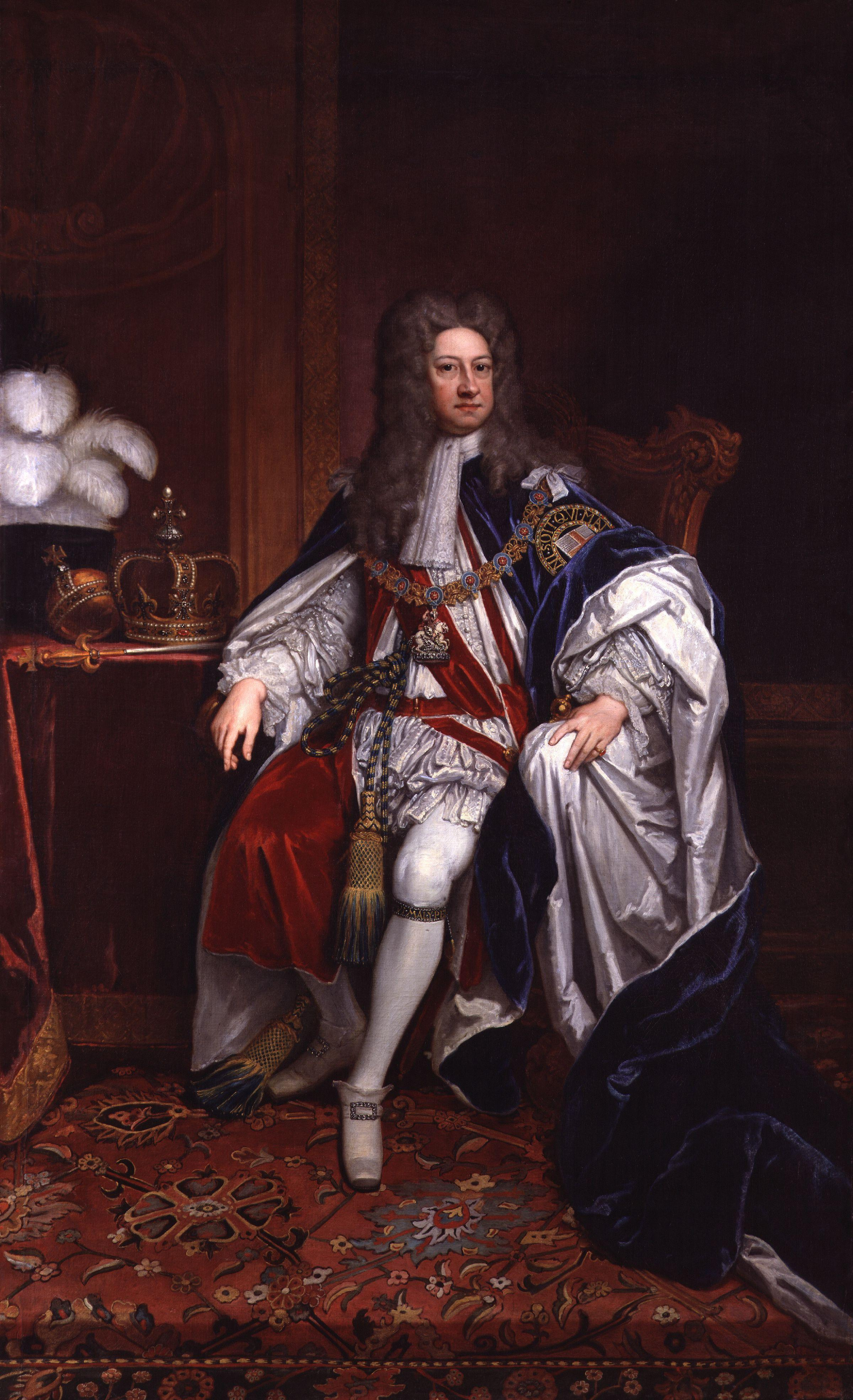
George I

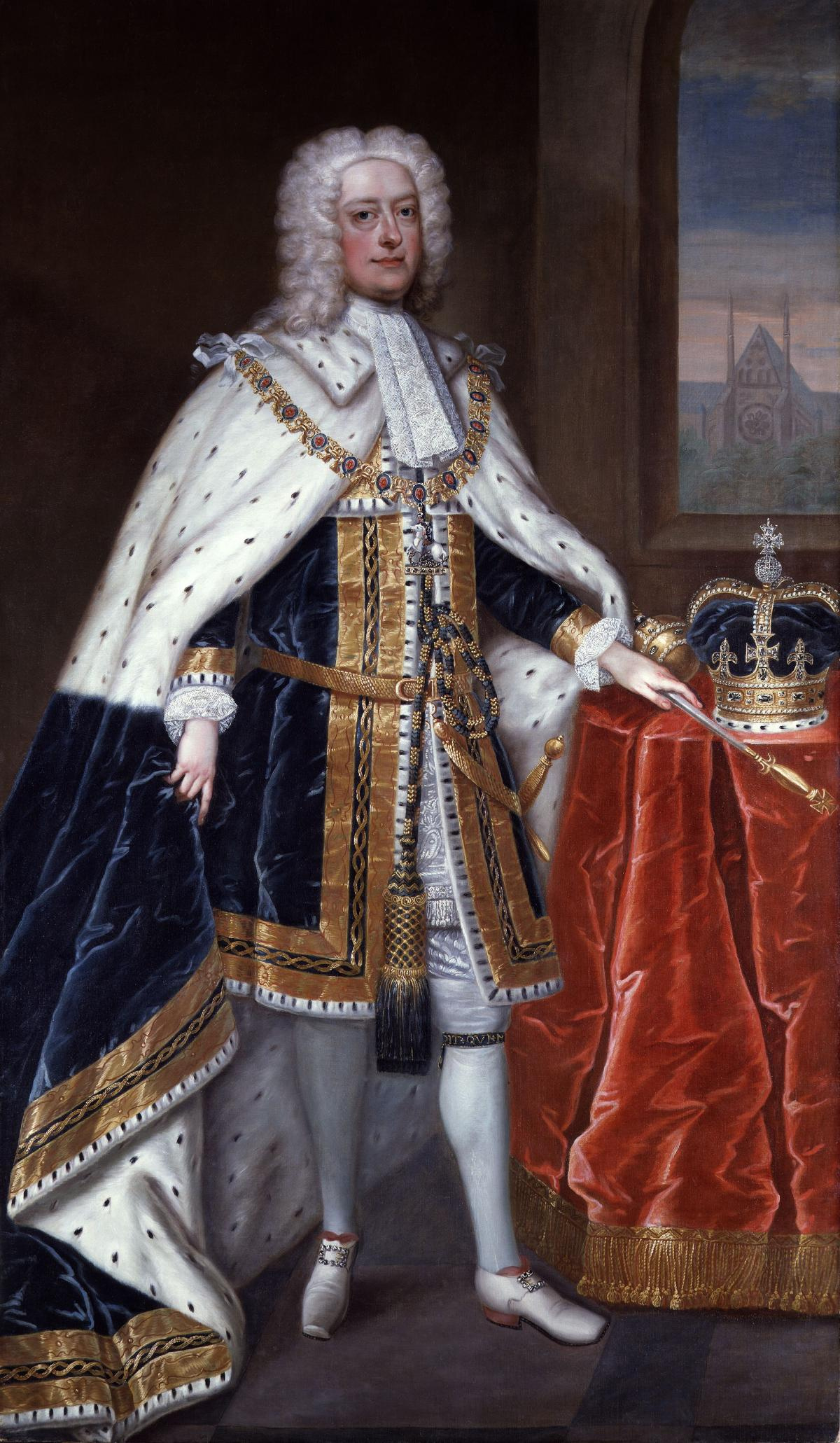
George II

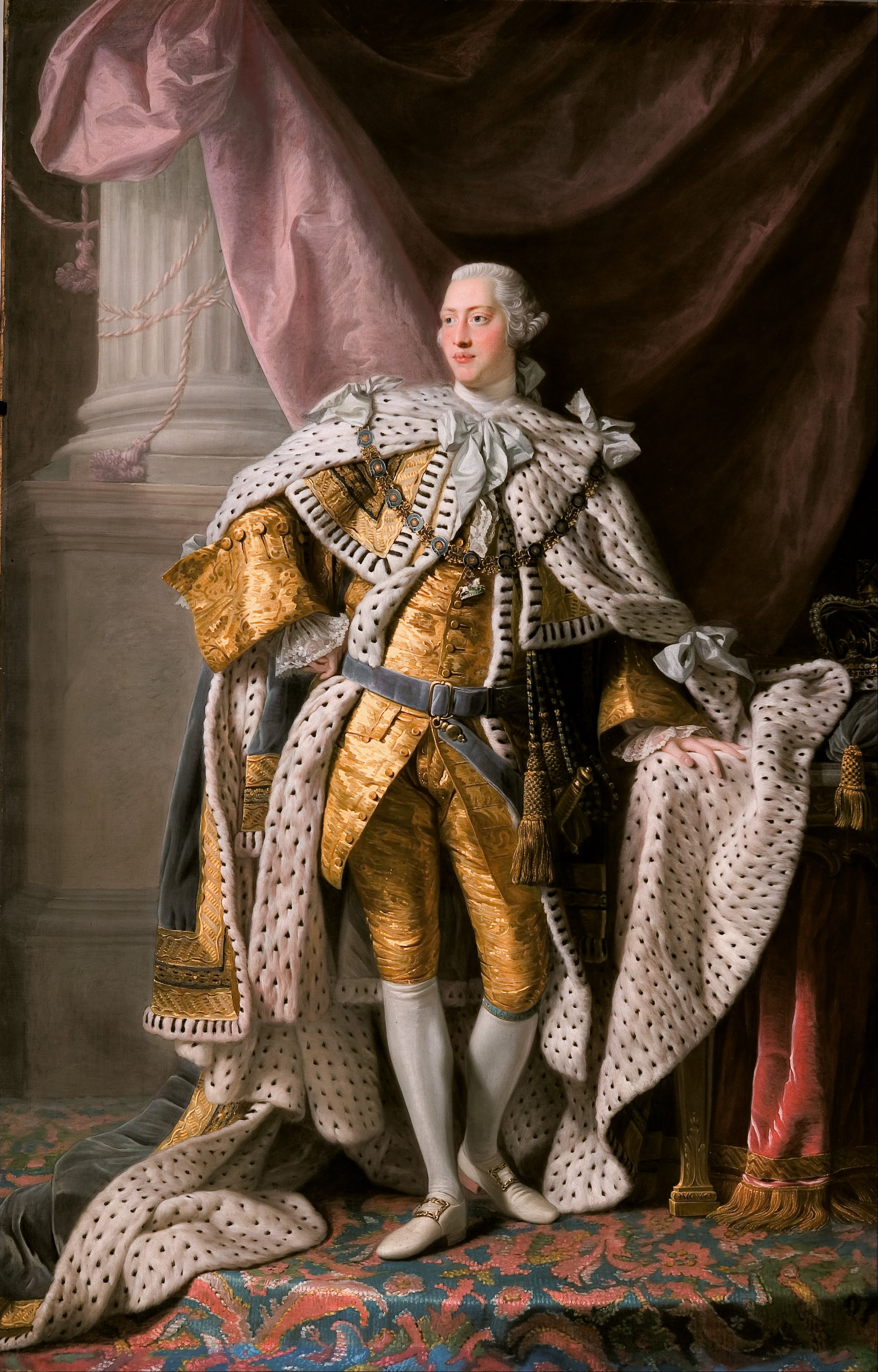
George III

The monarch independently appointed and paid diplomats, accredited foreign envoys, and used personal audiences with these envoys to directly influence the direction of international policy and the terms of peace. Furthermore, sovereignty over the Electorate of Hanover and the administration of the British colonies provided the Crown with ongoing opportunities to shift resources, expand its own power base, and actively influence the political situation in the British homeland. Although he had to confirm his recognition of the parliament its laws and statutes by taking the oath of coronation he acted as the chief arbiter between the parliament the court and the different offices. Every appointment to a position in the administrative, court, or military spheres—down to the lowest ranks, such as a cornet—required the king’s approval and his personal signature. This formal requirement provided the king with constant opportunities to negotiate political matters and issues of patronage directly with his ministers.

==== Privy Council and Cabinet ====
Officially by law the Privy Council acted as the executive body on behalf of the king. But when at the end of the 17th century it had become too large and too diverse a body to be an effective instrument of government, William III had set up a small advisory body including the Lord Chancellor, the Lord President of the Privy Council, the Lord Privy Seal and the two Secretaries of State.

When Queen Anne ascended the throne, the Privy Council remained responsible for subordinate bodies such as the Cabinet Council, but its responsibilities gradually diminished. Simultaneously, the Queen began meeting regularly with the cabinet council, and an inner group designated as Lords of the Committee. By that stage, the members of the outer cabinet council represented all the key branches of the state. It consisted of the Lord Chamberlain as the head of the Household, the Lord Steward; the Lord President of the Privy Council, the Lord Privy Seal, the Lord Keeper or Chancellor and the Archbishop of Canterbury as the heads of the legal and ecclesiastical departments.

The civilian and military departments were represented by the Lord Treasurer or First Lord of the Treasury and occasionally the Chancellor of the Exchequer if the posts were held by different men, the three Secretaries of State one being for Scotland, the Lord Lieutenant of Ireland and the Commander-in-Chief of the armed forces. The Lords of the Committee or inner cabinet which had four or five members was to consult ministers and individuals outside the Cabinet Council if necessary and report back to the Council, enabling the Queen in Council to make a final decision.Since these cabinets were still in the making there were no collective responsibility.

Although important members held private meetings, their political opinions, despite a minimum of agreement, varied greatly. Instead, each member saw themselves as servants of the monarch.The system of two cabinets remained during the reign of George I and George II but the significance steadily turned to the inner cabinet. As a body that, during Anne’s reign, prepared matters for discussion in the Cabinet Council, it now increasingly took decisions that were submitted to that council for formal consideration, but essentially for ratification.

==== Great Officers of State ====
The Great Officers of State were divided into various groups. Hereditary honorary offices, such as that of Earl Marshal, no longer played a role in government. The offices attached to the royal household—including the Lord Steward, the Lord Chamberlain, and the Comptroller—remained responsible for the king’s private affairs. Over time, other offices evolved from the royal household into independent ministries of state, including the Lord Chancellor, the Lord Treasurer, the Lord Privy Seal, and the Lord High Admiral. These were joined by newer, independent agencies such as the Secretaries of State, the Secretary at War, and the Postmaster General.

To prevent any single official from becoming too powerful relative to the monarch, George I, on the advice of Hans Caspar von Bothmer, left the office of Lord High Treasurer vacant. Instead, he had the Treasury administered by a commission of officials. The office of Lord High Admiral was similarly administered, either permanently or intermittently, by a commission, while most other departments remained under the leadership of a single minister. For the day-to-day administration of the state, the Secretaries of State for the Northern and Southern Departments divided foreign policy and internal security among themselves on a geographical basis. While the Southern Department was responsible for Southern Europe, the colonies, and Irelandthe Northern Department had jurisdiction over Northern Europe. In 1782, the two Secretaries of State were reorganised into the Secretary of State for the Home Department and the Secretary of State for Foreign Affairs.Military power rested with specialized agencies such as the Admiralty for the Navy and the War Office and the Ordnance Board for the Army. The Lord Chancellor served as the Chief Justice and speaker of the House of Lords.

==== Prime Minister ====
The most influential office to emerge during this period was that of Prime Minister, even though this title had no official legal basis at the time. Robert Walpole is regarded as the first to have fulfilled this role in the modern sense, by combining the office of First Lord of the Treasury with that of Chancellor of the Exchequer.

==== Secretaries ====
Additionally there were further offices that did not belong the Great Officers of State but carried out important duties. The Secretary at War acted as a link between Parliament and the army. Responsible for recruitment, billeting, supply and the details of day-to-day business as the head of an administrative department, he was also a politician who had to pilot the army estimates through Parliament and dealing with any other administrative matters. Until 1794, when the Secretary at War was placed under the authority of the Secretary of State for War, the Secretary at War was subject to the Home Secretary.In order to control the American colonies more effectively in 1768 the Colonial Secretary was founded.

=== Judiciary ===
The three common law courts were composed of a total of twelve judges. Each court consisted of four judges. The presiding judges: the Lord Chief Justice of the King’s Bench, the Lord Chief Justice of the Common Pleas, and the Lord Chief Baron of the Exchequer. The associate judges: the Puisne Justices and the Puisne Barons. Although theoretical rights remained the same, practical obligations changed dramatically in the 18th century. Since cases heard before the Court of Common Pleas were the most lucrative fierce economic competition for lawsuits developed. The King’s Bench and the Exchequer stole civil cases from the Common Pleas by means of sophisticated legal fictions. They also narrowed down the jurisdiction of the Ecclesiastical Courts and the Court of Admiralty. The judicial year was divided into two parts: the judges spent part of the time in Westminster, and the rest traveling along fixed routes (circuits) to hold the so-called assize courts (district courts) in the county seats. In the 18th century, it became customary to bring all capital crimes (crimes punishable by death) directly before the assizes. According to the Act of Settlement, judges were appointed for life by the monarch. Only serjeants-at-law could be appointed as judges of the King’s Bench, the Court of Common Pleas, or the Court of Exchequer.

==== Court of King's Bench ====
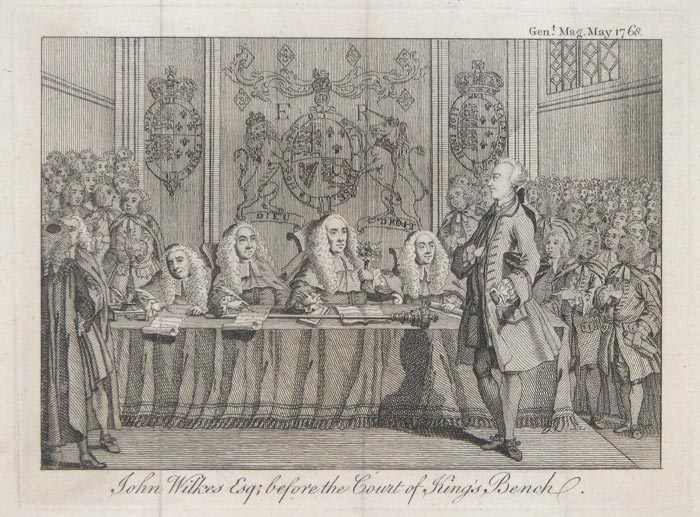
John Wilkes before the Court of King's Bench engraving from The Gentleman's Magazine for May 1768.

Established in 1234 by an edict of Henry III, the Court of King's Bench had jurisdiction over criminal cases directly involving the Crown (Pleas of the Crown), oversight of lower courts through extraordinary legal remedies (Prerogative Writs), and jurisdiction over appeals based on errors of law (Writs of Error).

==== Court of Common Pleas ====
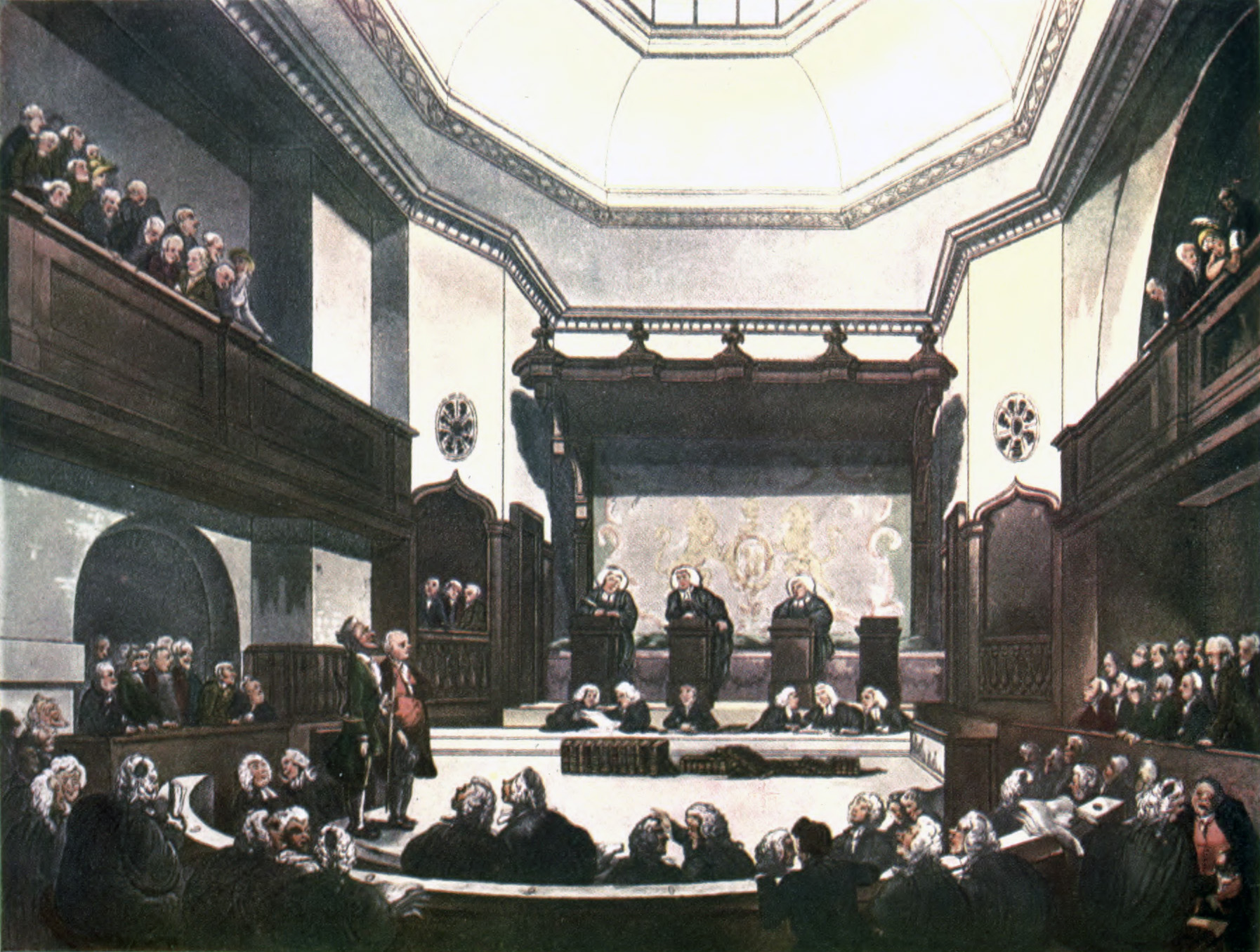
Court of Common Pleas

The Court of Common Pleas was considered the lock and key of common law. The jurisdiction of that court concerned the right of freehold or realty. It also determined personal pleas, i.e. actions for the recovery of a debt, personal property, or damages, although the King's Bench had concurrent authority over some of these. The court met daily during its four terms to hear and determine all legal matters arising in civil cases, whether real, personal or mixed and compounded of both. The Court of Common Pleas also had original jurisdiction, as well as upon removal from the inferior courts. However, an appeal could be made from the Court of Common Pleas to the King's Bench, and later to the Exchequer Chamber.

==== Court of Exchequer ====
The jurisdiction of the Court of Exchequer covered the king’s finances, estates, and revenues. The king’s tenants, direct royal debtors, and their own debtors could bring cases before this court. Disputes over seized land, eviction suits, or proceedings in which the Crown itself was a party also fell under the jurisdiction of this court, whereas purely private disputes with no impact on royal revenues were excluded. Furthermore, the court had the authority to remit debts and bonds on grounds of equity and, through the Exchequer Chamber, served as the court of appeal for defective judgments concerning royal estates.

==== Court of Chancery ====
Headed by the Lord Chancellor the Chancery's jurisdiction was complementary to that of the courts of common law. It sought to do justice in cases for which there was no adequate remedy at common law such as all covins, frauds and deceits. It had originated in the petition, not the writ, of the party who felt aggrieved to the Lord Chancellor as the keeper of the King's conscience. Until 1813 the court consisted of two judges: the Lord Chancellor and the Master of the Rolls

== Operating procedures ==
In order to submit a draft bill, in the case of a private law it was necessary to submit a petition setting out the specific grievance. This petition (when based on facts that may be disputed in nature) was referred to a committee of members, who examined the matter alleged and report on it to the House; and then (or, alternatively, upon the mere petition) leave is granted to introduce the bill. In public matters the bill was brought in upon motion made to the house, without any petition at all. The bill was read a first and second time, upon the speaker opened to the House the substance of the bill, and put the question, whether it should proceed any further.

Once the bill had passed the second reading it was referred to a committee; which was either selected by the House of Commons in matters of small importance, or else, upon a bill of consequence the House resolved itself into a committee which consisted of every member. To form it, the speaker quit the chair and sat and debated as a private member. The bill was then entirely debated, amendments made or re-modelled. Once it had passed the committee the chairman reported it to the House upon its members reconsidered the whole bill again. Afterwards the bill was then ordered to be engrossed, or written in a strong gross hand, on one or more long rolls of parchment sewed together.

When this was finished, it was read a third time, asking again whether the bill should pass. If this was agreed, the title to it was then settled and send to the House of Lords. It there passes through the same forms as in the other house (except engrossing). Once the bill received consent the House of Commons were informed and the bill remained in the House of Lords awaiting royal assent. The royal assent could be given in two ways: In person; when the monarch came to the house of peers, in his crown and royal robes, sending for the commons the titles of all the bills that have been passed both houses were read. Afterwards the answer was declared by the clerk of the parliament in Norman-French.

If the monarch gave consent to a public bill, the clerk usually declared, (Norman: le roy le veut, the king wants it so to be); if to a private bill, (Norman: soit fait comme it est desire, be it as it is desired.) If the monarch refused his assent, (Norman: le roy s' avisera, the king will advise upon it.) When a bill of supply was passed, it was carried up and presented to the monarch by the speaker of the house of commons and the royal assent was thus expressed, (Norman: le roy remercie ses loyal subjects, accepte lour benevolence, et aussi le veut, the king thanks his loyal subjects, accepts their benevolence, and wills it so to be.)

In case of an act of grace, which originally proceeded from the crown and had the royal assent in the first stage of it, the clerk of the parliament thus pronounced the gratitude of the subject; (Norman: les prelats, seigneurs, et commons, en ce present parliament assemblèes, au nom de touts vous autres subjects, remercient tres humblement votre majeste, et prient a Dieu vous donner en santé bone vie et longue, the prelates, lords, and commons, in this present parliament assembled, in the name of all your other subjects, most humbly thank your majesty, and pray to God to grant you in health and wealth long to live.) The monarch may gave his assent by letters patent under his great seal, signed with his hand, and notified in his absence to both Houses assembled together. When the bill had received the royal assent in either of these ways, it became a statute or act of parliament.

== Bibliography ==
- Black, Jeremy (2004). The Hanoverians: the History of a Dynasty. London: Hambledon. ISBN 1-85285-446-4.
- Blackstone, William (1768). Commentaries on the laws of England. Oxford: Clarendon Press.
- Brock, W. R. (2008). "England". In Lindsay, J. O. (ed.). The Old Regime 1713-63. The New Cambridge Modern History. Vol. VII. Cambridge: Cambridge University Press. ISBN 0-521-04545-2.
- Cunningham, Timothy (1783). "A New and Complete Law Dictionary or General Abridgment of the Law on a more Extensive Plan than any Law Dictionary hitherto published containing not only the Explanation of the Terms but also the Law itself both with Regard to Theory and Practice". London: J. F.& C. Rivington.
- DeBeer, E. S. (2008). "The English Revolution". In Lindsay, J. O. (ed.). The Old Regime 1713-63. The New Cambridge Modern History. Vol. VII. Cambridge: Cambridge University Press. ISBN 0-521-04545-2.
- Farmer, D. L. (1966). Britain And The Stuarts. New York: Humanities Press.
- Gipson, Lawrence Henry (1958a). The Triumphant Empire: The Rumbling of the Coming Storm 1766-1770. The British Empire before the American Revolution. Vol. XI. New York: Knopf. OCLC 1391274697.
- Gipson, Lawrence Henry (1958). A Guide to Manuscripts Relating to the History of the British Empire 1748-1776. The British Empire before the American Revolution. Vol. XV. New York: Knopf. OCLC 1391288944.
- Hilton, Boyd (2006). A Mad, Bad, and Dangerous People? England 1783–1846. New Oxford History of England. Oxford: Oxford University Press. ISBN 978-0198228301.
- Jacob, Giles (1788). Every man his own Lawyer. London: Strahan & Woodfall.
- Jarrett, Derek (1967). Britain 1688-1815. London: Longman.
- Johnston, Edith M. (1963). Great Britain and Ireland, 1760-1800: a Study in Political Administration. Edinburgh & London: Oliver and Boyd.
- Jupp, Peter (2006). The Governing of Britain, 1688-1848 : the Executive, Parliament, and the People. New York: Routledge. ISBN 0-4152-2949-9.
- Kair, David (1960). The Constitutional History of Modern Britain, since 1485. London: A. and C. Black.
- Kiralfy, A. K. R. (1956). The English Legal System. London: Sweet & Maxwell Limited.
- Langford, Paul (1992). A Polite and Commercial People England 1727-1783. Oxford: Oxford University Press. ISBN 0-1925-4395-4.
- Manchester, A. H. (1980). A modern legal history of England and Wales 1750-1950. London: Butterworths. ISBN 0-406-62263-9.
- Marshall, Dorothy (1966). Eighteenth Century England A History of England. New York: David McKay.
- Ogg, David (2008). "The Emergence of Great Britain as a World Power". In Bromley, J.S. (ed.). The Rise of Great Britain and Russia 1688-1715/25. The New Cambridge Modern History. Vol. VI. Cambridge: Cambridge University Press. ISBN 0-521-07524-6.
- Osmond, John Stuart (1933). Parliament and the army, 1642-1904. Cambridge: The University Press.
- Phillips, John A. (1982). Electoral behavior in unreformed England: plumpers, splitters, and straights. Princeton: Princeton University Press. ISBN 0-691-05365-0.
- Porritt, Annie G.; Porritt, Edward (2014). England and Wales. The Unreformed House of Commons. Vol. I. Cambridge: Cambridge University Press. ISBN 1-1076-4004-0.
- Radcliffe, G. R. Y. (1971). The English Legal System. London: Butterworths.
- Rowland, David (1859). A Manual of the English Constitution : with a Review of its Rise, Growth, and Present State. London: J. Murray.
- Underhill, Nicholas (1978). The Lord Chancellor. Lavenham: Dalton. ISBN 0-900-96381-6.
- Wiener, Joel H., ed. (1974). Great Britain: The Lion at Home: a Documentary History of Domestic Policy, 1689-1973. Vol. I. New York: Chelsea House Publishers.
- Williams, Glyn; Ramsden, John (1990). Ruling Britannia: a Political History of Britain 1688-1988. London: Longman. ISBN 0-582-48485-5.
