= Williamite =

Followers of William III of England

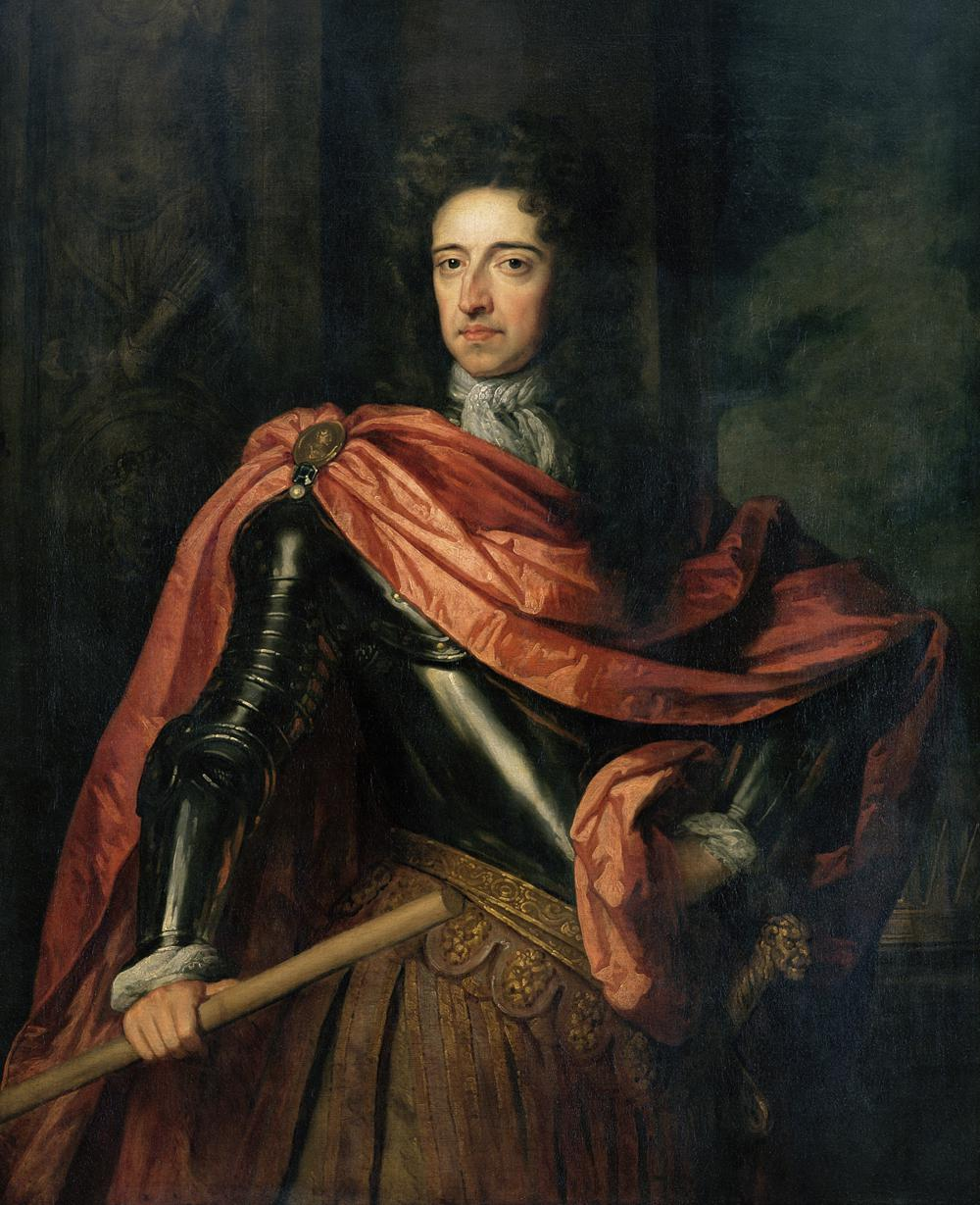
- William III
- Dates active: 1688–1702
- Active regions: British Isles
- Ideology: Constitutional monarchy; Protestant supremacy; Rejection of Absolutism; Opposition to Louis XIV of France
- Wars: Jacobite rising of 1689; Williamite War in Ireland

Williamite is a term often used to describe British and Irish supporters of William III/II and his wife, Mary II, who deposed James II in November 1688. Like its counterpart, Jacobitism, the ideology was less of a consistent doctrine than a collection of political and religious positions, as well as opposition to the expansion of French power under Louis XIV.

Although William himself died in 1702, these principles were at the centre of British government in the 18th century, as well as the Protestant Ascendancy in Ireland. He is still depicted in the iconography of the Orange Institution.

== Origins ==
One of William's aims was to ensure England's entry into his League of Augsburg against France in the Nine Years' War. For Williamites in Britain and Ireland, William was seen as the guarantor of civil and religious liberty and the Protestant monarchy against Catholic absolutism.

The term "Williamite" is also commonly used to refer to William's multi-national army in Ireland during the Williamite War in Ireland, 1689–1691. In Ireland itself, William was primarily supported by Protestants and opposed by the native and Anglo-Irish Catholic Jacobites who supported James. Once James II had come to the throne in 1685, he had his viceroy Richard Talbot, Earl of Tyrconnell replace Protestants with Catholics in the government. The Royal Irish Army was purged of Protestants, who were replaced by Catholic officers and soldiers. The Irish Militia was disarmed and its weapons issued to Catholics.

In response in 1689 Irish Protestants formed their own Army of the North, proclaimed William of Orange to be King, and began seizing strongholds around Cork and particularly in Ulster. However the Jacobite Irish Army was able to re-establish control, taking Bandon and routing the Army of the North during the Break of Dromore. Before long only Derry and Enniskillen still held out.

After these early setbacks, Williamite forces won a series of victories during the war, defending Derry and capturing Carrickfergus in 1689. Subsequent battles at the Boyne and Aughrim led to a decisive victory at Limerick by 1691. William himself led his forces at the Boyne in 1690, which was widely commemorated in paintings such as Benjamin West's The Battle of the Boyne. He is still depicted in the iconography of the Orange Order, whose name comes from William's dynasty, the House of Orange-Nassau.

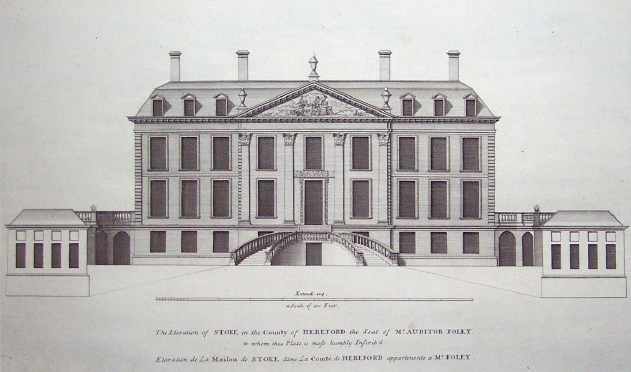
Stoke House (1695) in Vitruvius Britannicus I (1715)

"Williamite" is sometimes applied to Late Stuart country house architecture built c. 1690–1710 in the conservative classicising English tradition that had been established under Charles II by Hugh May and Sir Christopher Wren, of which Belton House, Lincolnshire, and, formerly Stoke Edith, Herefordshire are typical examples. Such compact houses do not fit easily within the conventions of English baroque architecture.

The purple star of the Williamite army is present on the flag of the Orange Order

== Sources ==
- J.G. Simms, Jacobite Ireland, London 1969
