= Triennial Acts =

1641 Acts by the English Parliament

Triennial Act 1640
- Act of Parliament
- Parliament of England
- Long title: An Act for the preventing of inconveniencies happening by the long intermission of Parliaments.
- Citation: 16 Cha. 1. c. 1
- Territorial extent: England and Wales

Dates
- Royal assent: 16 February 1641
- Commencement: 3 November 1640 (Note: Start of session.)
- Repealed: 16 March 1664
Other legislation
Repealed by	Triennial Parliaments Act 1664
Relates to	Triennial Act 1694; Septennial Act 1715

Status: Repealed

Text of statute as originally enacted

Triennial Parliaments Act 1664
- Act of Parliament
- Parliament of England
- Long title: An Act for the assembling and holding of Parliaments once in Three yeares at the least, And for the repeale of an Act entituled An Act for the preventing of Inconveniencies happening by the long Intermission of Parliaments.
- Citation: 16 Cha. 2. c. 1
- Territorial extent: England and Wales

Dates
- Royal assent: 5 April 1664
- Commencement: 16 March 1664
- Repealed: 16 September 1887
Other legislation
Repeals/revokes	Triennial Act 1640
Repealed by	Statute Law Revision Act 1887
Relates to	Triennial Act 1694; Septennial Act 1715

Status: Repealed

Text of statute as originally enacted

The Triennial Act 1640 (16 Cha. 1. c. 1), also known as the Dissolution Act, was an act passed on 15 February 1641, by the English Long Parliament, during the reign of King Charles I. The act required that Parliament meet for at least a fifty-day session once every three years. It was intended to prevent kings from ruling without Parliament, as Charles had done between 1629 and 1640. If the King failed to call Parliament, the act required the Lord Chancellor to issue the writs, and failing that, the House of Lords could assemble and issue writs for the election of the House of Commons. Clause 11 was unusual because it explicitly stated that this bill would receive royal assent before the end of the parliamentary session. At that time, bills did not customarily gain royal assent until after the end of the session. There was a risk that, if this Clause 11 had not been present, the Act might not have come into force until the next parliament.

In 1664, the 1640 Act was repealed by the Triennial Parliaments Act 1664 (16 Cha. 2. c. 1). Though this new Act maintained the requirement that a parliament be called at least once in three years, there was no mechanism to enforce this requirement. Thus, Charles II was able to rule for the last four years of his reign without calling a parliament.

Under the Triennial Act 1694 (6 & 7 Will. & Mar. c. 2), also known as the Meeting of Parliament Act 1694, Parliament was to meet annually and general elections were to be held once every three years. The country thus remained in a state of what was said to be constant election fever (ten elections in twenty years) and loyalties among MPs were difficult to establish, which increased partisanship and rivalry in these Parliaments. This state of political instability is often known as the 'Rage of Party'.

In 1716, the Septennial Act 1715 (1 Geo. 1. St. 2. c. 38) took effect, under which a parliament could sit for up to seven years. This act ushered in a period of greater stability in British politics, with long-lasting parliaments and governments typical through much of the 18th century.
