= Rage of Party =

English political era, 1688-1715

The Rage of Party was the tumultuous period in English politics directly after the Glorious Revolution of 1688 until c. 1715. This period was characterised by political instability brought about by increased partisanship within Parliament and frequent elections. Eleven Parliaments met in this period, partly as a result of the Triennial Act 1694, which meant a general election had to be held every three years. In fact, on average an election was held every two and a half years.

The period ended with the Hanoverian succession and the passage of the Septennial Act 1716 allowing up to seven years between elections.

== Political divisions ==
There were two main axes of political conflict during this period. The Whigs, who supported the Glorious Revolution and the Protestant succession, opposed the Tories, who, although supporting the new monarchs in a de facto sense, were disturbed by the disruption to the divine succession which the Glorious Revolution entailed. Outside of this division was the Court/Country axis. Court politicians were either in government or sought to be, and were thus supportive of centralised power and the dominance of Parliament by the executive. Country politicians distrusted centralised power and were keen to secure the independence of Parliament.
