= Federalist No. 63 =

Federalist Paper by James Madison about the US Senate

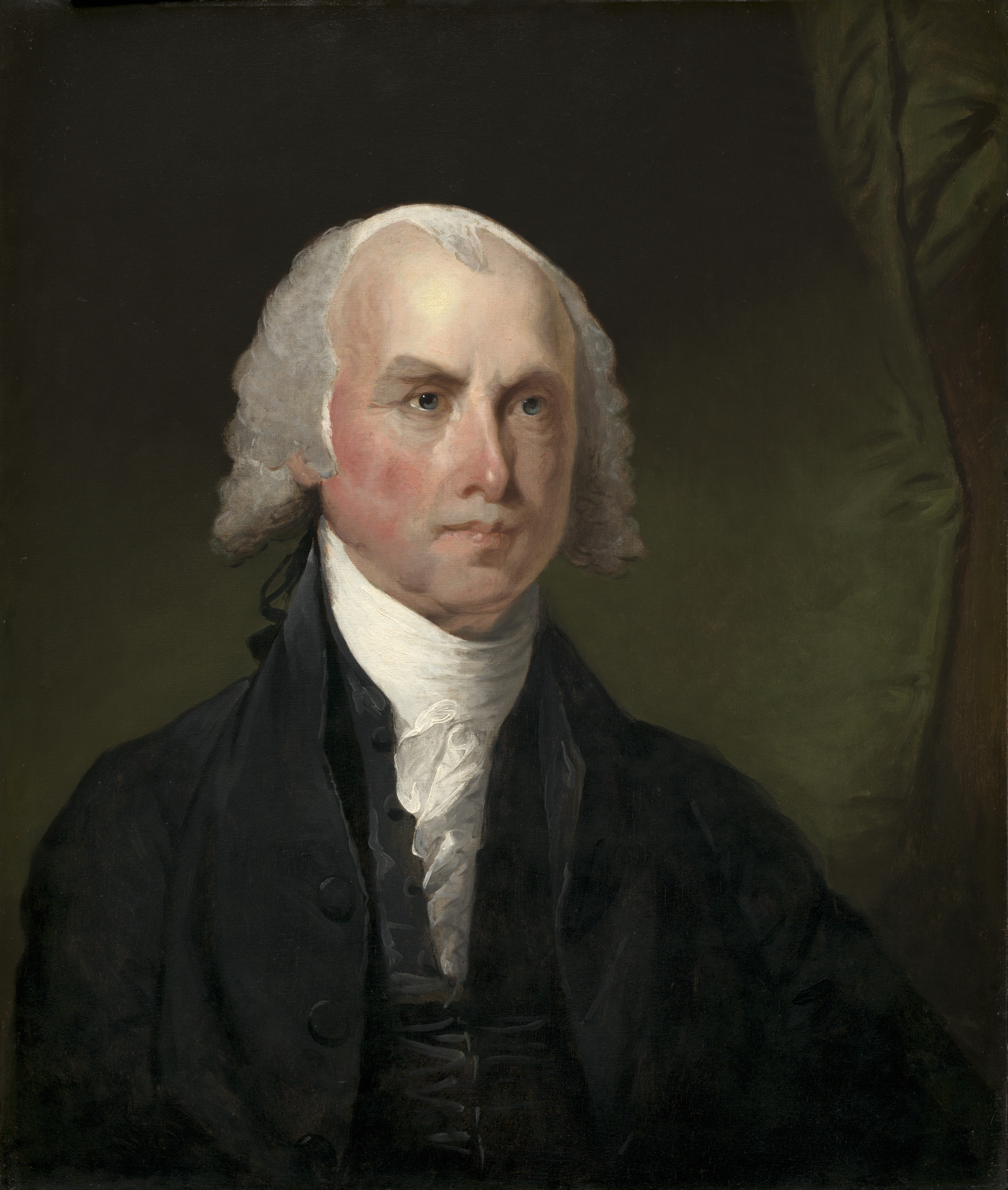
- James Madison, author of Federalist No. 63
- Author: James Madison
- Original title: The Senate Continued
- Language: English
- Series: The Federalist
- Publisher: New York Packet
- Publication date: March 1, 1788
- Publication place: United States
- Media type: Newspaper
- Preceded by: Federalist No. 62
- Followed by: Federalist No. 64

Federalist No. 63, is an essay by James Madison, is the sixty-third of The Federalist Papers. It was first published by The New York Packet on March 1, 1788, under the pseudonym Publius, the name under which all The Federalist papers were published. Continuing what Madison begun in Federalist No. 62, this essay is the second of two detailing and justifying the organization of the United States Senate. No. 63 is titled "The Senate Continued". This essay is the last of Madison's contributions to the series.

In this paper, Madison lays out more reasons for the necessity of the Senate. He argues that the Senate, a strong and the most stable member of the government, is needed to ensure lasting relations with foreign nations. He also notes that because Senators are elected to six-year terms, they will have sufficient time to be responsible for their actions. The Senate can also serve as a check on the people since, although during most times their will is just, they too are "subject to the [periodic] infection of violent passions."

Madison also gives examples of past long-lived republics, all of which had a Senate. They, however, had senates elected for life, which, if followed, could threaten the liberty of the people. It is for this reason that the Senate proposed in the constitution has six-year terms. In this way, the Senate in the Union blends stability with the idea of liberty.
