= Federalist No. 52 =

Federalist Paper by James Madison, or possibly Alexander Hamilton

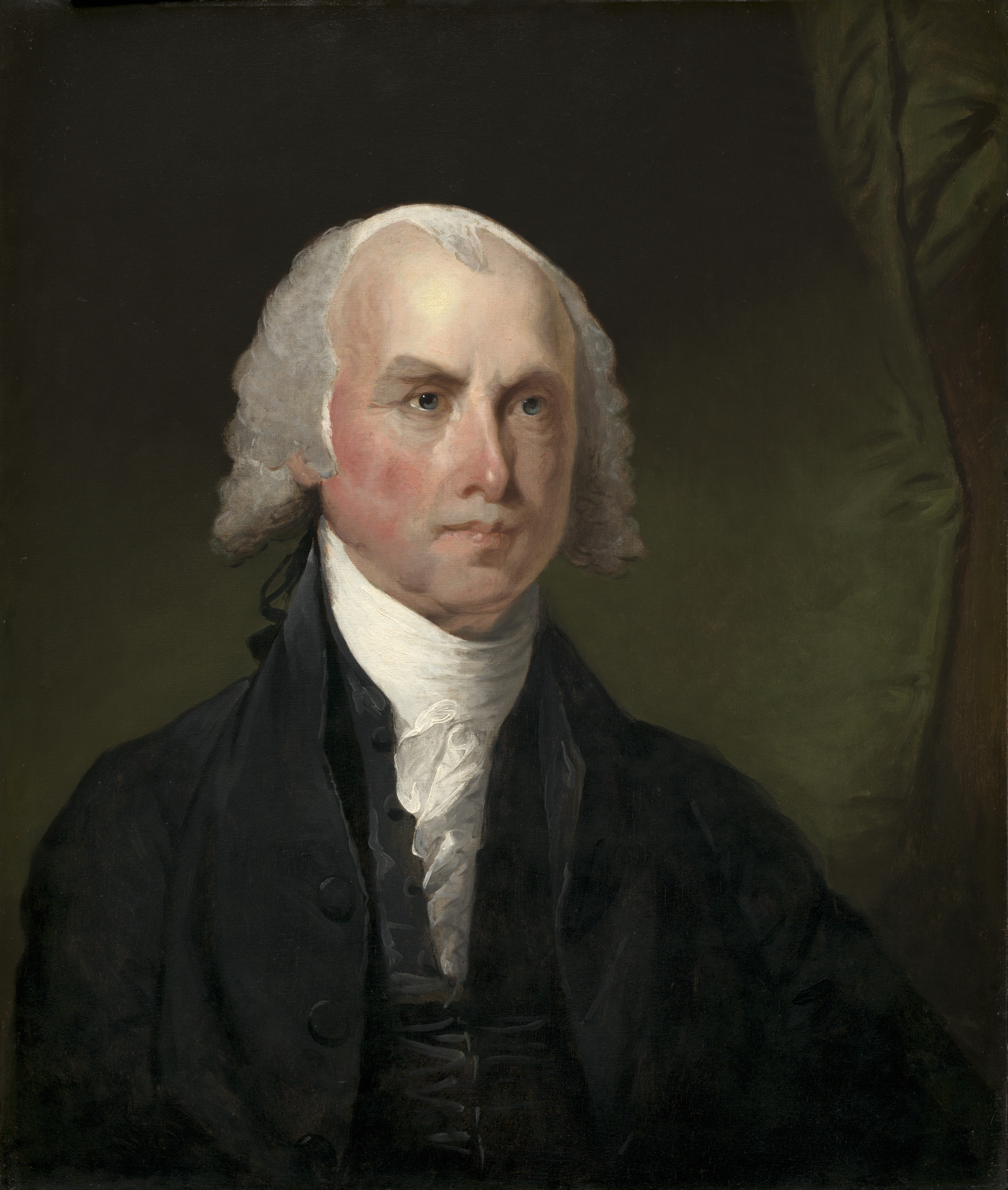
- James Madison, author of Federalist No. 52
- Author: James Madison
- Original title: The House of Representatives
- Language: English
- Series: The Federalist
- Publisher: New York Packet
- Publication date: February 8, 1788
- Publication place: United States
- Media type: Newspaper
- Preceded by: Federalist No. 51
- Followed by: Federalist No. 53

Federalist No. 52, an essay by James Madison or Alexander Hamilton (Note: it is disputed as to which one wrote this essay), is the fifty-second essay out of eighty-five making up The Federalist Papers, a collection of essays written during the Constitution's ratification process, most of them written either by Hamilton or Madison. It was published in the New York Packet on February 8, 1788, with the pseudonym Publius, under which all The Federalist papers were published. This essay is the first of two examining the structure of the United States House of Representatives under the proposed United States Constitution. It is titled "The House of Representatives".

The essay is largely concerned with qualifications of representatives and the frequency of their election. The Federalists argued that annual elections would not afford representatives enough time to learn about their office. They proposed biennial elections to allow representatives to gain experience without remaining in office for too long.

The essay also makes reference to the right to vote as laid down in the Constitution, stating:

The definition of the right of suffrage is very justly regarded as a fundamental article of republican government. It was incumbent on the convention, therefore, to define and establish this right in the Constitution. To have left it open for the occasional regulation of the Congress, would have been improper for the reason just mentioned. To have submitted it to the legislative discretion of the States, would have been improper for the same reason; and for the additional reason that it would have rendered too dependent on the State governments that branch of the federal government which ought to be dependent on the people alone.

Federalist paper no.52 also continues on to Federalist paper no.53 titled "House of Representative continued" to continue the argument about biennial election and reassuring that their liberty will be secure under the proposed constitution.

== Background ==
Before the ratification of the U.S. Constitution, the United States government was organized and ran under the Articles of Confederation. With the Articles of Confederation, Congress was a unicameral body, meaning it was a single house. During the Constitutional Convention, the most lengthy debate was over how to structure a new Congress; eventually, the Great Compromise created a bicameral Congress, split into the House of Representatives and the Senate. This balanced the interest of smaller and larger states, giving larger states more power in the House, and all states an equal voice in the Senate.

Federalist 52 was Madison/Hamilton's attempt to explain the reasoning of the qualifications of the House of Representatives, and why it would be elected every two years.

== Essay's Argument/Reason ==
The essay begins by stating the House representatives were to be elected by popular vote, with the electors in each state to be consistent with the way each state government had established for its own legislative body. At the time of the Constitution's birth, this was almost exclusively white male landowners. It then states the qualifications of the elected, which were to be at least 25 years of age, seven years a citizen of the United States, and an inhabitant of the state being represented. These qualifications were to give the House the widest range of possible merit of all descriptions, including younger people, naturalized and native citizens, less wealthy, and open to a wider range of religious faiths.

The essay then goes into a lengthy review of other legislative bodies, both in American states and abroad, and the length of terms of those bodies. The author's review includes a range of terms from one to seven years, and concludes by stating that the biennial approach proposed for the House of Representatives was a proper balance between giving Representatives time to become experienced and yet not becoming too entrenched. Since the House of Representatives was to be potentially the most powerful of the two houses, its term should be somewhat limited. ("It is a received and well-founded maxim, that where no other circumstances affect the case, the greater the power is, the shorter ought to be its duration.")

These arguments are continued and expounded upon in Federalist 53.

For more information about the structure and workings of both houses of Congress, see United States Congress.

== Antifederalist Response ==
In Antifederalist #52, "On the Guarantee of Congressional Biennial Elections", written by Malichi Maynard and Samuel Field, the chief criticism was not the biennial nature of elections to the House, but the potential that the Constitution seemed to give Congress as to changing the nature of Congressional elections as stated in Article I, Section 4. The Antifederalists, as was often their way, presumed the absolute worst-case scenario; here, they foresaw Congress postponing elections simply to maintain control and reduce the people to a state of "abject vassalage." Over 230 years later, it would seem as though the Antifederalists were wrong in this fear, given that there has never been a postponed set of elections in the history of the United States, including in time of domestic and international turmoil.
