= Federalist No. 53 =

Federalist Paper by James Madison on the House of Representatives

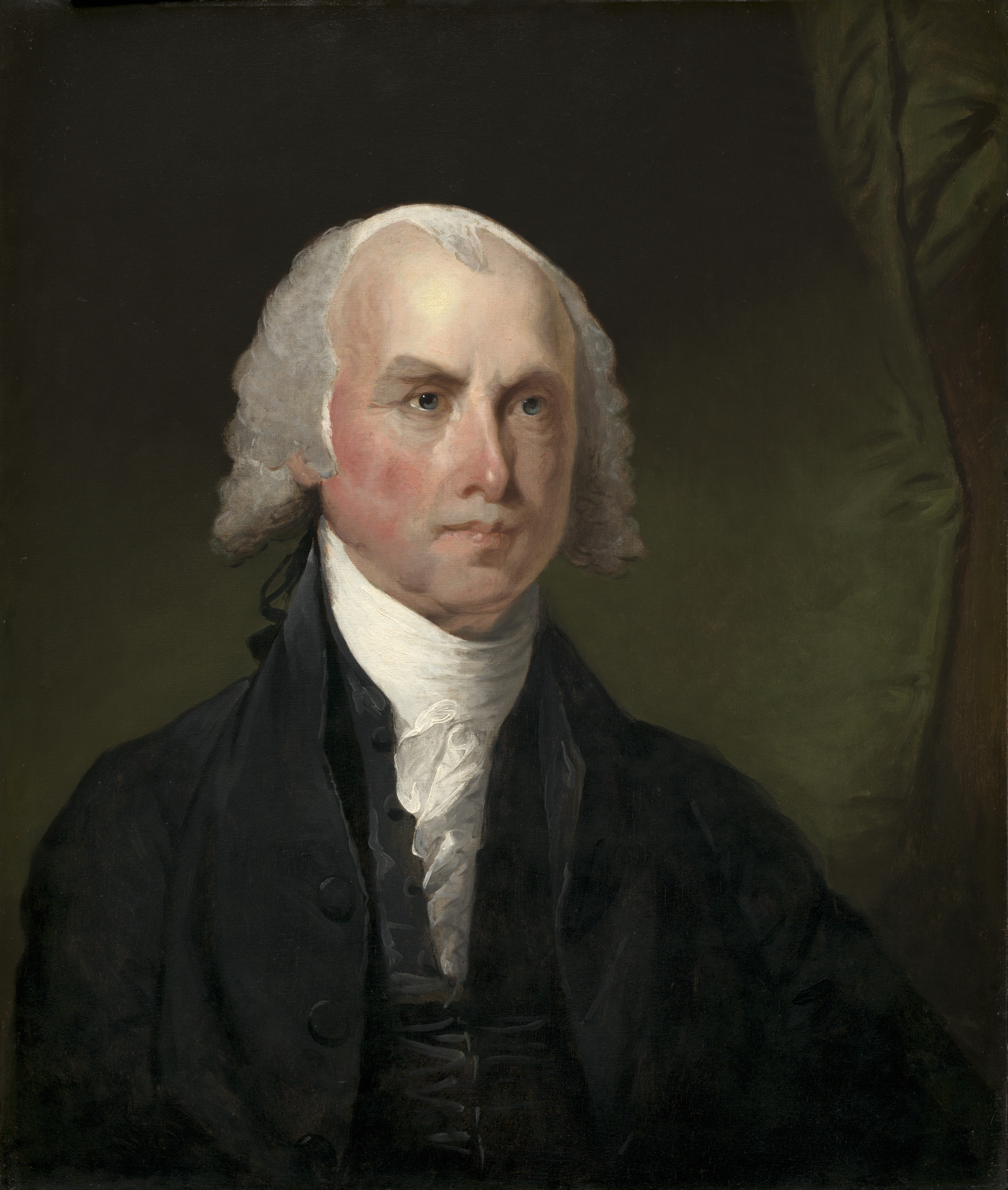
- James Madison, author of Federalist No. 53
- Author: James Madison
- Original title: The Same Subject Continued: The House of Representatives
- Language: English
- Series: The Federalist
- Publisher: New York Packet
- Publication date: February 12, 1788
- Publication place: United States
- Media type: Newspaper
- Preceded by: Federalist No. 52
- Followed by: Federalist No. 54

Federalist No. 53 is an essay by James Madison, the fifty-third of The Federalist Papers. It was published in the New York Packet on February 12, 1788, under the pseudonym Publius, the name under which all The Federalist papers were published. This essay is the second of two examining the structure of the United States House of Representatives under the proposed United States Constitution. It is titled "The Same Subject Continued: The House of Representatives".

Anti-federalists had argued that one-year House terms would be more "democratic" or "representative" than longer terms. Defending the two-year terms adopted in the Constitution, Madison argues that Representatives in the House will need some knowledge of national affairs (how things work in the different states), as well as some minimal knowledge of foreign affairs. Because experience in the House counts here, two-year terms are appropriate.

Madison also argued that one-year House terms would increase the amount of election fraud in the election of Representatives. His reasoning was that it takes a while for election fraud to come to light. If the elections were annual, a representative could buy an election and serve most of his term before the fraud came to light.
