= Meeting of Parliament Act 1694 =

Act of the Parliament of England

Meeting of Parliament Act 1694 (Note: The citation of this act by this short title was authorised by section 5 of, and the second schedule to, the Statute Law Revision Act 1948. Due to the repeal of those provisions, it is now authorised by section 19(2) of the Interpretation Act 1978.)
- Act of Parliament
- Parliament of England
- Long title: An Act for the frequent Meeting and calling of Parliaments. (Note: These words are printed against this act in the second column of the second schedule to the Statute Law Revision Act 1948, which is headed "Title".)
- Citation: 6 & 7 Will. & Mar. c. 2
- Territorial extent: England and Wales; Ireland

Dates
- Royal assent: 22 December 1694
- Commencement: 12 November 1694 (Note: Start of session.)
- Repealed: Republic of Ireland: 9 December 1963 (Note: The Electoral Act 1963 (Commencement) (No. 2) Order 1963 (SI 1963/245))
Other legislation
Amended by	Septennial Act 1715; Statute Law Revision Act 1867; Statute Law Revision Act 1888; Statute Law Revision Act 1948
Repealed by	Republic of Ireland
Relates to	Triennial Act 1640; Triennial Act 1664; Septennial Act 1715

Status: Partially repealed

Text of statute as originally enacted

Revised text of statute as amended

Text of the Meeting of Parliament Act 1694 as in force today (including any amendments) within the United Kingdom, from legislation.gov.uk.

The Meeting of Parliament Act 1694 (6 & 7 Will. & Mar. c. 2), also known as the Triennial Act 1694, is an act of the Parliament of England. This act is Chapter II Rot. Parl. pt. 1. nu. 2.

The act required Parliament to meet annually and to hold general elections once every three years.

As of 2026, the act is partly in force in England and Wales. The sections of the act still in force require that Parliament hold a session at least once every three years.

== Subsequent developments ==
Sections 3 and 4 of the act were repealed by section 1 of, and the schedule to, the Statute Law Revision Act 1867 (30 & 31 Vict. c. 59), which came into force on 15 July 1867.

The whole act was repealed for the Republic of Ireland by section 3 of, and schedule 1 to, the Electoral Act 1963, which came into force on 9 December 1963.

== See also ==
- Triennial Acts
