= Septennial Act 1715 =

Act of the Parliament of Great Britain

Septennial Act 1715 (Note: The citation of this act by this short title was authorised by section 1 of, and the first schedule to, the Short Titles Act 1896. Due to the repeal of those provisions it is now authorised by section 19(2) of the Interpretation Act 1978.)
- Act of Parliament
- Parliament of Great Britain
- Long title: An Act for enlarging the Time of Continuance of Parliaments, appointed by an Act made in the Sixth Year of the Reign of King William and Queen Mary, intituled, "An Act for the frequent meeting and calling of Parliaments."
- Citation: 1 Geo. 1. St. 2. c. 38
- Introduced by: Duke of Devonshire (Lords)
- Territorial extent: England and Wales; Scotland

Dates
- Royal assent: 7 May 1716
- Commencement: 17 March 1715 (Note: Start of session.)
- Repealed: 15 September 2011
Other legislation
Amends	Triennial Act 1694
Amended by	Short Titles Act 1896; Parliament Act 1911
Repealed by	Fixed-term Parliaments Act 2011
Relates to	Meeting of Parliament Act 1694; Dissolution and Calling of Parliament Act 2022

Status: Repealed

Text of statute as originally enacted

Revised text of statute as amended

The Septennial Act 1715 (1 Geo. 1. St. 2. c. 38), sometimes called the Septennial Act 1716, was an act of the Parliament of Great Britain. It was passed in May 1716. It increased the maximum length of a parliament (and hence the maximum period between general elections) from three years to seven. This seven-year ceiling remained in law from 1716 until 1911. The previous limit of three years had been set by the Triennial Act 1694 (6 & 7 Will. & Mar. c. 2), enacted by the Parliament of England.

The act's ostensible aim was to reduce the expense caused by frequent elections. It did not require Parliament to last for a full term, but merely set a maximum length on its life. Most parliaments in the remainder of the eighteenth century did indeed last for six or seven years, with only two lasting for a shorter time. In the nineteenth century, the average length of a term of the Parliament of the United Kingdom was four years. One of the demands of the mid-nineteenth century Chartists—the only one that had not been achieved by the twentieth century—was for annually elected parliaments.

The act was amended on 18 August 1911 by section 7 of the Parliament Act 1911 (1 & 2 Geo. 5. c. 13) to reduce the maximum term of a parliament to five years.

The whole act was repealed by the Fixed-term Parliaments Act 2011 which required by law that elections be held at least once every five years. It has since been reenacted, with minor differences, as section 4 of the Dissolution and Calling of Parliament Act 2022.

== Provisions ==
The text of the act was very short. As originally in force, it stated:

Be it enacted by the King's most excellent Majesty, by and with the advice and consent of the lords spiritual and temporal, and commons, in Parliament assembled, and by the authority of the same, that this present Parliament, and all Parliaments that shall at any time hereafter be called, assembled, or held, shall and may respectively have continuance for seven years, and no longer, to be accounted from the day on which by the writ of summons this present Parliament hath been, or any future Parliament shall be, appointed to meet, unless this present or any such Parliament hereafter to be summoned shall be sooner dissolved by his Majesty, his heirs or successors.

The act overturned certain provisions of the Triennial Act 1694 (6 & 7 Will. & Mar. c. 2).

== Aim and effects ==
The ostensible aim of the act was, by reducing the frequency of elections, to reduce the cost during a given period of holding them. However, it may have had the effect of keeping the Whig party, which had won the 1715 general election, in power for a longer time. The Whigs won the following general election in 1722.

== Status as law vs constitution ==
James Madison used the act as an illustrative example of the difference between the traditional British system and the revolutionary new American constitution. In Federalist No. 53 Madison drew a distinction between "a Constitution established by the people and unalterable by the government, and a law established by the government and alterable by the government." The Act was also criticized by Thomas Paine and Henry St John, 1st Viscount Bolingbroke. In Dissertation upon Parties, Bolingbroke wrote that the "constitution is the rule by which our princes ought to govern at all times".

== Prolongation of Parliament during the First World War and Second World War ==
During the First World War, a series of acts were passed to prolong the life of the parliament elected in December 1910 until the end of the war in 1918. A series of annual Acts were also passed during the Second World War to prolong the parliament elected at the 1935 general election until the war in Europe had ended in mid-1945.

=== First World War ===
Short title	Citation	Date of assent	Maximum duration (Note: Maximum duration of the existing parliament as extended by the act)
Parliament and Registration Act 1916	Act of the Parliament of the United Kingdom 1916 c. 100	27 January 1916	5 years and 8 months
Parliament and Local Elections Act 1916	6 & 7 Geo. 5. c. 44	23 August 1916	6 years and 3 months
Parliament and Local Elections Act 1917	7 & 8 Geo. 5. c. 13	26 April 1917	6 years and 10 months
Parliament and Local Elections (No. 2) Act 1917	7 & 8 Geo. 5. c. 50	29 November 1917	7 years and 6 months
Parliament and Local Elections Act 1918	8 & 9 Geo. 5. c. 22	30 July 1918	8 years

=== Second World War ===
Short title Long title	Citation	Date of assent	Maximum duration
Prolongation of Parliament Act 1940; An Act to extend the duration of the present Parliament.	3 & 4 Geo. 6. c. 53	6 November 1940	6 years – to 18 November 1941
Prolongation of Parliament Act 1941; An Act to extend the duration of the present Parliament.	4 & 5 Geo. 6. c. 48	11 November 1941	7 years – to 18 November 1942
Prolongation of Parliament Act 1942; An Act to extend the duration of the present Parliament and to provide for the extension of the duration of the House of Commons of Northern Ireland.	5 & 6 Geo. 6. c. 37	22 October 1942	8 years – to 18 November 1943
Prolongation of Parliament Act 1943; An Act to extend the duration of the present Parliament and to provide for the extension of the duration of the House of Commons of Northern Ireland.	6 & 7 Geo. 6. c. 46	11 November 1943	9 years – to 18 November 1944
Prolongation of Parliament Act 1944; An Act to extend the duration of the present Parliament and to provide for the extension of the duration of the House of Commons of Northern Ireland.	7 & 8 Geo. 6. c. 45	17 November 1944	10 years – to 18 November 1945

== Bibliography ==
- 'Book 1, Ch. 19: George I', A New History of London: Including Westminster and Southwark (1773), pp. 306–25. URL: https://www.british-history.ac.uk/report.asp?compid=46736. Date accessed: 20 November 2006.
