= Federalist No. 8 =

Federalist Paper by Alexander Hamilton

- As published in The Daily Advertiser, alongside Federalist No. 9
- Author: Alexander Hamilton
- Original title: Consequences of Hostilities Between the States
- Language: English
- Series: The Federalist
- Publisher: New York Packet
- Publication date: November 20, 1787
- Publication place: United States
- Media type: Newspaper
- Preceded by: Federalist No. 7
- Followed by: Federalist No. 9
- Text: Federalist No. 8 at Wikisource

Federalist No. 8, titled "Consequences of Hostilities Between the States", is a political essay by Alexander Hamilton and the eighth of The Federalist Papers. It was first published in the New-York Packet on November 20, 1787, under the pseudonym Publius, the name under which all The Federalist Papers were published. It was a response to critics of a national standing army, and it examines a scenario in which the states of the United States are not unified and military conflict occurs between them.

Federalist No. 8 argues that if the states are not unified and come into military conflict with one another, then they will be forced to maintain standing armies. These armies would then infringe on civil liberties and cause despotism. It says that the United States should prefer a single army at the national level, as this would be easier to control. The essay describes geography as a factor in the maintenance of an army, saying that the ocean protects the United States from European invasion but would not protect the states from one another. These ideas were revisited in Federalist No. 24 through No. 29. Since the publication of Federalist No. 8, Hamilton's description of the United States as safe from invasion has generally proved correct, and the U.S. created a permanent standing army following World War II.

== Summary ==
Publius begins by arguing that war between the states would be worse on civilians than war between European nations because the states lack defensive infrastructure like fortifications and standing armies. He says that this would encourage states to give up liberty in the name of safety. Publius warns that while the proposed constitution would allow a national standing army, the states would inevitably create their own standing armies if they were not in union, and that this in turn would cause the states to adopt despotism analogous to European government.

Publius compares the states to the ancient Greek republics, which never had standing armies despite being at war with one another. He explains that modern developments in industry and warfare have made the concept of citizen soldiers impractical. He then describes the army of a nation frequently invaded, which is kept larger and risks infringing on civil liberties, comparing it to the army of a nation infrequently invaded, which can be kept smaller and therefore less likely to infringe on liberties. Publius then compares the states to Great Britain, which he says has avoided despotism because it is separated from Europe by a body of water and does not need to maintain a large standing army. He says that the United States could have a similar advantage if the states are unified, but that they would be enemy nations if they separated.

== Background and publication ==
Federalist No. 8 was written by Alexander Hamilton. Following the Constitutional Convention in 1787, Hamilton worked with James Madison and John Jay to write a series of essays to explain the provisions of the Constitution of the United States and persuade New York to ratify it. They published these essays in New York newspapers under the shared pseudonym Publius. It was first published in the New-York Packet on November 20, 1787, and then in the Daily Advertiser and the Independent Journal on November 21, 1787. Federalist No. 8 continued the argument of Federalist No. 7 that union would provide better security for the states than division. The Federalist Papers had yet to address the issue of a standing army in its first seven essays; opponents of the proposed constitution feared that a national standing army would be dangerous to the states.

== Analysis ==
Alexander Hamilton, author of Federalist No. 8

=== Standing army ===
During Hamilton's lifetime, it was widely accepted in political philosophy that the size and centralization of a government was correlated with increased engagement in war. While he accepted that there were inherent dangers in a standing army, Hamilton gave little credence to those who objected to the existence of such an army. He believed that the military would be loyal to the people, who would oppose military action against the states. Hamilton presented the issue as one of risk against one of guaranteed failure, saying that the risks surrounding a standing army would be even greater if it was not created under a national government. He argued that a failure to unify would create a constant state of war. Hamilton believed that war between the states would be especially devastating, as the states had no fortifications or standing armies of their own. This would then lead to "plunder and devastation" during times of war, incentivizing the creation of fortifications and a standing army by each state to prevent entry of enemy combatants. These standing armies would then be more entrenched in society than if it had been created as part of a national government.

Hamilton compared the nature of contemporary warfare to that of ancient Greece, arguing that the Greeks had no need for a standing army. He explained that the Greeks were able to employ civilian-soldiers, while modern obligations in industry made it difficult for men to give up their occupations to go to war and advancements in warfare made it difficult for untrained men to become soldiers. The ancient Greeks also found themselves taken from their trades to serve in armies, while a modern volunteer military allows professionals to retain their roles. Hamilton further warned that a professional class of soldiers creates an air of societal importance around the soldier that can diminish the citizen's place in society.

Federalist No. 8 was the first of The Federalist Papers to reference modern industry as something valuable to society, describing the advancements that have called men to professions other than war. Conversely, he acknowledged that this expansion of industry is what allowed technological advancements in warfare to develop. The essay revisited an idea from Federalist No. 1: that the United States found itself in such a convenient position be accident. Federalist No. 2 proposed that this position was brought about by divine providence.

The idea of unifying under a central government for common defense is essential to the philosophies of Thomas Hobbes and John Locke. Hamilton described a "natural course of things" in Federalist No. 8, reminiscent of the "natural condition of mankind" as described by Hobbes. The natural course of things as Hamilton described it prevents control of government by the people; it begins with entry into war, which leads to a strengthening of the army, which in turn leads to despotism.

=== Geographical advantage ===
Hamilton made an appeal to geography in Federalist No. 8, similar to that which had been made by John Jay in earlier essays. He believed that the United States was advantaged because it was geographically separated from other nations, and he warned that splitting into several nations would nullify this advantage. If the states were to be separate, Hamilton argued, then they would be no different than the nations of Europe in their conflicts. Hamilton compared the circumstance to Great Britain, which as an island nation was able to isolate itself from conflict with other European nations. This allowed Great Britain to avoid the entrenchment of a standing army that would curtail liberty. Peace in the British Isles had been a recent development, only coming to be after the Kingdom of Great Britain was established through the union of England and Scotland in 1707.

Applying this logic to the United States, Hamilton argued that the states would be isolated from conflict if they were unified but that they would be surrounded by one another as adversaries if separated, not unlike continental Europe. A similar explanation for American democracy was given by 19th century political scientist Alexis de Tocqueville in his study of the United States, though de Tocqueville did not give consideration to what may have been if the states had not unified. To appease detractors of standing armies, Hamilton argued that the low odds of an invasion meant that an American army could remain small.

== Aftermath ==
Hamilton continued his arguments regarding a standing army in Federalist No. 24 through No. 29. In Federalist No. 41, James Madison repeated Hamilton's argument that geographic isolation was an asset for Great Britain and the United States. In Federalist No. 51, Madison echoed Hamilton's argument regarding the risk of sacrificing liberty, applying the same logic to justice instead of safety. The Anti-Federalist Papers took the opposite position as Federalist No. 8, criticizing the proposed constitution for allowing the creation of a national standing army. Shortly after the constitution's ratification, it was amended with the Bill of Rights. The Second Amendment guaranteed private citizens the right to bear arms and states the right to form militias, while the Third Amendment forbade the military from quartering soldiers in the homes of private citizens.

As Hamilton suggested, the geographic position of the United States kept it from facing direct invasion, excepting the War of 1812. His prediction of disunion in the states leading to war also saw relevance in the American Civil War. Hamilton's description of the army as a privileged class can be compared to the concepts of valor and heroism associated with military service. Public opinion on standing armies has changed since the writing of The Federalist Papers. Instead of a detriment to the protection of liberties, military strength has come to be seen in the United States as a means of its protection. Following World War II, the United States established a strong standing army and formed international alliances that sometimes involve military support, including NATO and the United Nations. The United States has since used its army to engage with opponents in other parts of the world, nominally to protect democracy, but also to ensure its own security through mutual defense
