= Federalist No. 27 =

Federalist Paper by Alexander Hamilton

- Alexander Hamilton, author of Federalist No. 27
- Author: Alexander Hamilton
- Language: English
- Series: The Federalist
- Publisher: New York Packet; New York Journal
- Publication date: December 25, 1787
- Media type: Newspaper
- Preceded by: Federalist No. 26
- Followed by: Federalist No. 28
- Text: Federalist No. 27 at Wikisource

Federalist No. 27, titled "The Same Subject Continued: The Idea of Restraining the Legislative Authority in Regard to the Common Defense Considered", is an essay by Alexander Hamilton, the twenty-seventh of The Federalist Papers. It was published on December 25, 1787, under the pseudonym Publius, the name under which all The Federalist papers were published. Federalist No. 27 is the second of three successive essays covering the relationship between legislative authority and military force, preceded by Federalist No. 26, and succeeded by Federalist No. 28.

Federalist No. 27 considers the anti-federalist belief that military force would be necessary to enforce the will of the federal legislature, with Hamilton arguing that it would not. Hamilton argues that the people will respect a government that is well administered and that a federal government would be better administered than the state governments. The issue of American support for the federal government has persisted since the ratification of the constitution, and political philosophers have cited Federalist No. 27 to justify expansion of civil service and governmental transparency.

== Summary ==
Hamilton begins by challenging the idea that citizens will not obey the laws of the government in the proposed constitution. He argues that in most cases it is how a government is administered that determines the loyalty of the citizens rather than how distant it is. He expresses his opinion that the federal government would be better administered than the state governments, citing the structure and scope of the federal government. Hamilton then argues that a larger federal government would be better equipped to prevent sedition than a smaller state government, further discouraging the people from ignoring the federal government. He also suggests that citizens will be more amicable to a federal government as it exists over time and expands its scope. Hamilton concludes that the federal government would be less likely to use military force to ensure compliance with its laws rather than more likely. Finally, he explains that the constitution, if ratified, would give power over the federal government to the people and give the federal government the benefit of state law enforcement.

== Background and publication ==
Federalist No. 27 was written by Alexander Hamilton. Following the Constitutional Convention in 1787, Hamilton worked with James Madison and John Jay to write a series of essays to explain the provisions of the Constitution of the United States and persuade New York to ratify it. They published these essays in New York newspapers under the shared pseudonym Publius. It first appeared in the New-York Journal and the New-York Packet on December 25, 1787, followed by the Independent Journal and the Daily Advertiser on the following day. Federalist No. 27 expanded on the subject of popular support between the state governments and the federal government that Hamilton had addressed in Federalist No. 17, and it directly continued Hamilton's arguments regarding military enforcement of the law and legislative control of the military in No. 24 and No. 26.

Shays' Rebellion took place shortly before the writing of the Federalist Papers. It represented popular discontent among citizens that necessitated military force by the government. This may have influenced Hamilton's thoughts when writing Federalist No. 27, though he maintained the position that such discontent would become less common over time.

== Analysis ==
Federalist No. 27 considered whether a federal government can appeal to the people as well as state governments and whether the people will be inclined to obey the laws of a federal government. Anti-federalists of the time argued that a federal government is too remote to inspire loyalty or obedience, and they feared that a federal government may force the people to comply if it has control over a standing military. Hamilton challenged this idea in Federalist No. 27 with the argument that rational citizens will favor the government that has better laws, whether it be state or federal. He believed that a federal government would ultimately be more fit to govern and sustain the populace when organized as a republican government and invested with sufficient power. He argued that a federal government can win this favor without military strength when it is well-administered.

Hamilton made the case that the federal government will likely be administered better than the individual state governments, citing better electoral options for the people, less influence of factionalism, and an immunity to sudden ill-advised initiatives. He used the selection of federal senators by state legislatures as one example, considering it to be a measure that ensures the federal government is run by competent figures. Hamilton also argued that the federal government's scope would increase over time, allowing the people to become more accustomed to its presence.

== Aftermath ==
Federalist No. 27 was directly continued in Federalist No. 28, where Hamilton argues that it would be necessary for a federal military to enforce order in the face of rebellion. The idea of popular support for the federal government over the state governments would be revisited by James Madison in No. 46 and by Hamilton in No. 68.

Maintaining American support for the federal government has been a recurring political issue in the United States and has been the subject of extensive academic research. Changes to American republicanism, including the scope of the federal government and how citizens are represented in Congress, have provided new factors that re-contextualize Federalist No. 27. The issue of public support between state and federal governments would become a significant factor in 18th century politics with the development of regionalism in the United States and the growth of the country over a large distance, preventing administration that pleased all regions of the country and making national communication difficult. The nature of these concerns was altered with the advent of mass media.

Supporters of expanded civil service and the work of federal executive departments cite the arguments of Federalist No. 27 to argue for the necessity of such a system. Supporters of governmental transparency also cite Federalist No. 27 to demonstrate that a government is strengthened when citizens see it operating properly, and government transparency in the United States significantly increased in the latter half of the 20th century. The ideas of Federalist No. 27 are challenged by the modern conservative movement, which holds that the federal government is incapable of being sufficiently well-administered to earn public acceptance.

In the 1957 Supreme Court case Reid v. Covert, Federalist No. 27 was one of the works cited by Justice Hugo Black in his plurality opinion to establish that the founding fathers intended for civilian control of the military. It was a point of contention in the 1997 Supreme Court case Printz v. United States, in which Justice David Souter interpreted it to demonstrate support by Hamilton for federal authority over state officials. It was also cited in the 2015 Supreme Court case Arizona State Legislature v. Arizona Independent Redistricting Commission by Chief Justice John Roberts in his dissent to establish the historical understanding of what constitutes a legislature.
