= Federalist No. 25 =

Federalist Paper by Alexander Hamilton regarding the common defense

- Alexander Hamilton, author of Federalist No. 25
- Author: Alexander Hamilton
- Original title: The Same Subject Continued: The Powers Necessary to the Common Defense Further Considered
- Language: English
- Series: The Federalist
- Publisher: New York Packet
- Publication date: December 21, 1787
- Publication place: United States
- Media type: Newspaper
- Preceded by: Federalist No. 24
- Followed by: Federalist No. 26
- Text: Federalist No. 25 at Wikisource

Federalist No. 25, titled "The Same Subject Continued: The Powers Necessary to the Common Defense Further Considered", is a political essay written by Alexander Hamilton and the twenty-fifth of The Federalist Papers. It was first published in New York newspapers on December 21, 1787, under the pseudonym Publius, the name under which all The Federalist Papers were published. It is one of two essays by Hamilton arguing in favor of a national standing army during peacetime, along with Federalist No. 24.

Federalist No. 25 was written as an argument against the use of armies led by the states. Hamilton argued that a national army would be more accountable than state armies, as national control would be divided through separation of powers and serve in the interest of all states. He warned that individual state armies might not come to the aid of other states and that states might use their armies against the interest of the nation. Hamilton also used Federalist No. 25 to argue that standing armies are preferable to militias and that constitutional restrictions may be ignored if they are against the interest of the nation.

== Summary ==
Still considering the criticism of maintaining the national forces from Federalist No. 24, Publius argues against the idea that states should maintain militaries instead of the national government. In explaining the danger, Publius demonstrates that the territories of foreign nations surround the entirety of the nation, making the danger common to all the states. He says that if New York, for example, were attacked, it would be forced to provide all of its defense with no guarantee of support from other states. Publius warns that the states are not fit to maintain their own militaries, as they would support their own interests above those of the nation and that the people would be less suspicious of misuse of the army by individual states.

Publius shifts back to the general importance of a national army that would remain standing even during times of peace. He explains that if the national forces could only be summoned during times of war, the nation would leave itself vulnerable to an initial strike. He then argues that a restriction on standing armies would be ineffective, as the government itself would decide what constitutes a standing army, and because abuse of the army would require control over both the legislature and the executive, at which point a pretext to abuse the army could be fabricated even if restrictions existed. Publius also dismisses the use of militias, as they are not as efficient as a standing army. Publius cites examples of governments that were forced to raise their own armies during peacetime due to unrest. He concludes his argument by saying any restriction that becomes too much of a hindrance will be ignored, and that ignoring restrictions in emergencies will make people more complacent in ignoring them at other times.

== Background and publication ==
Federalist No. 25 was written by Alexander Hamilton. Following the Constitutional Convention in 1787, Hamilton worked with James Madison and John Jay to write a series of essays to explain the provisions of the Constitution of the United States and persuade New York to ratify it. They published these essays in New York newspapers under the shared pseudonym Publius. It was first published in the Daily Advertiser, the New-York Packet and the New-York Journal on December 21, 1787. It was then published in the Independent Journal on December 22.

Federalist No. 25 continued the argument of Federalist No. 24 in favor of a standing army. This had been an issue when forming the national government under the Articles of Confederation, being a point of contention during the 1783 committee of which Hamilton was a member. Here Hamilton had proposed a compromise of a small army totaling about 3,000 soldiers, supplemented by a part-time reserve force.

== Analysis ==
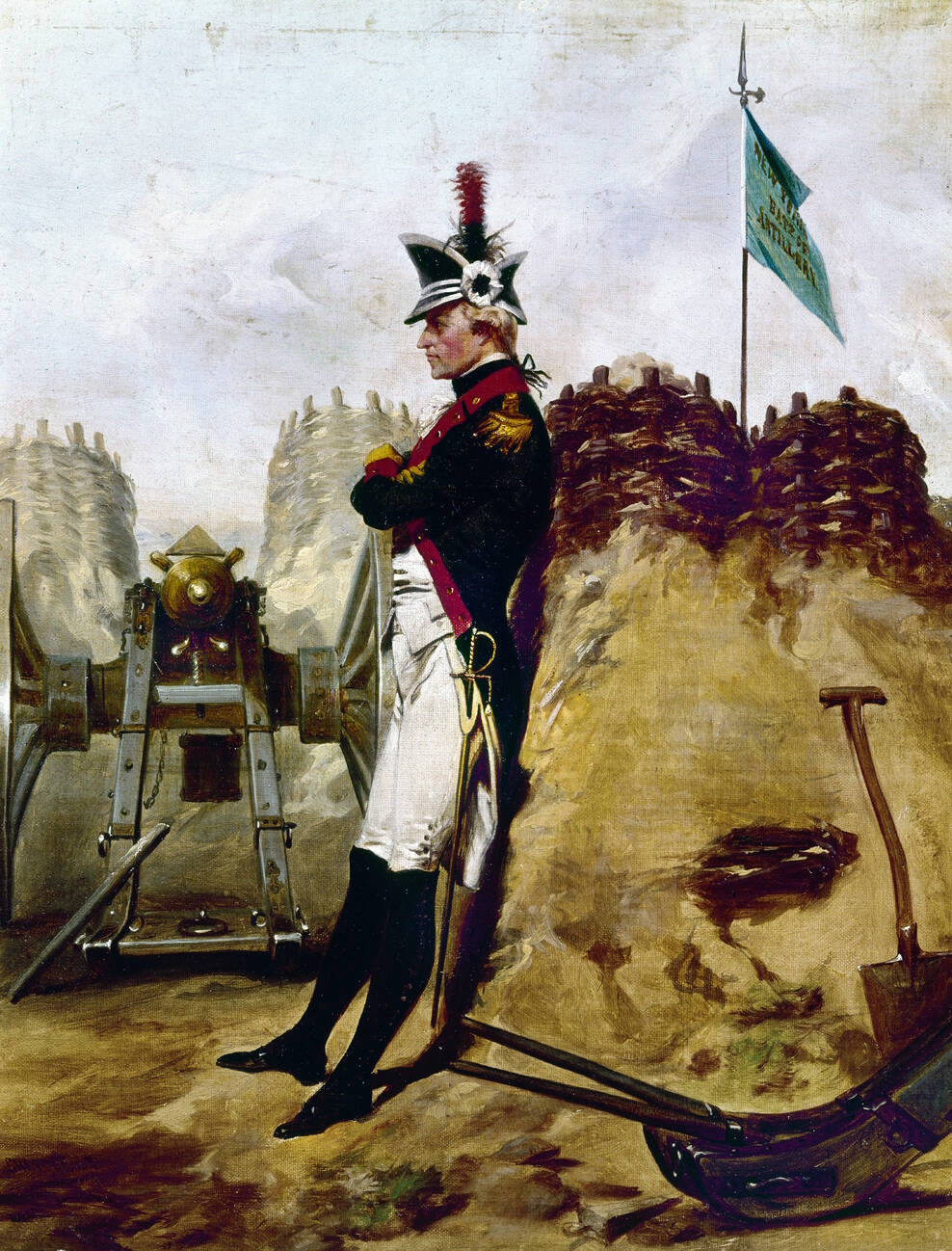
Hamilton in his military uniform with the New York Provincial Company of Artillery; he argued that a standing army was preferable to a state militia.

Hamilton argued in Federalist No. 25 that oversight of the army should be the responsibility of the national government, not the state governments. Warning that states in a federal system are always at risk of rivalry, he speculated that allowing states their own armies would tempt states to engage in conflict with one another or with the national government. As with Federalist No. 24, Hamilton maintained that a standing army is preferential to a militia, as those responsible for defense should be well-practiced. His belief on the matter was influenced by the Revolutionary War, which he felt was not well-fought by the American militias. He felt that the nation could not be respected, either by its people or by foreign nations, without a strong means of defense.

Hamilton warned that the United States was in a particularly vulnerable position because of its geography and that being "naked and defenseless" would invite hostility. He insisted on creating a standing army preemptively, rather than waiting until hostilities had already begun. Hamilton dismissed arguments that a standing army would enable tyranny by invoking the separation of powers that limited the executive's control over military affairs. He also warned that putting individual states in charge of their own armies would cause disorganization.

Hamilton believed that a national army would invite more scrutiny than state armies, allowing for greater accountability. Knowing that citizens were more closely aligned with their state governments than the national government, Hamilton believed that the people were in the most danger "when the means of injuring their rights are in the possession of those of whom they entertain the least suspicion". This was a dilemma for supporters of ratification: they believed that skepticism of the people would be a check on the national government, but they also needed the support of the people to create such a government.

Hamilton also used Federalist No. 25 to explain that a constitution must not rule "counter to the necessities of society", as such provisions would likely be ignored by politicians when necessary. In Federalist No. 25, he speculated that even if disallowed by the constitution, a standing army would be raised any time a thread was perceived. He further suggested that violations of the constitution, even in urgent situations, would set precedent in favor of ignoring the constitution in other circumstances.

== Aftermath ==
The Federalist Papers later revisited the argument that the constitution must not put undue restrictions on the government that will be ignored, discussing it in Federalists No. 40, No. 41, and No. 48. Federalist No. 25 has been cited in cases before the Supreme Court of the United States: Lewis F. Powell Jr. cited it in Selective Service System v. Minnesota Public Interest Research Group (1984) and Wayte v. United States (1985), and John Paul Stevens cited it in Perpich v. Department of Defense (1990).
