= Federalist No. 26 =

Essay by Alexander Hamilton

- Alexander Hamilton, author of Federalist No. 26
- Author: Alexander Hamilton
- Language: English
- Series: The Federalist
- Publisher: The Independent Journal
- Publication date: December 22, 1787
- Media type: Newspaper
- Preceded by: Federalist No. 25
- Followed by: Federalist No. 27
- Text: Federalist No. 26 at Wikisource

Federalist No. 26, titled "The Idea of Restraining the Legislative Authority in Regard to the Common Defense Considered", is an essay written by Alexander Hamilton in the twenty-sixth of The Federalist Papers. It was published on December 22, 1787, under the pseudonym Publius, the name under which all The Federalist papers were published. Federalist No. 26 expands upon the arguments of a federal military Hamilton made in No. 24 and No. 25, and it is directly continued in No. 27 and No. 28.

Federalist No. 26 addresses the power of the legislature to maintain a standing army during peacetime, making an argument in favor of the constitution's provisions regulating this power and criticizing anti-federalists who opposed granting this power to Congress. These arguments reflect Hamilton's views of centralized government and his rejection of the idea that government power necessarily constrains civil liberties. The arguments surrounding legislative power over the military would go on to influence the Second and Third amendments to the constitution, and legislative maintenance of a standing army has since become standard practice in the United States.

== Summary ==
Hamilton condemns the urge to sacrifice governmental power in the name of private rights. He describes the legislature's power over the military as one such example, describing the importance of this power and explaining why he believes the representative government is able to prevent a military coup. He cites historical precedent for his proposed system by describing how the English Bill of Rights 1689 empowered the Parliament of England to regulate peacetime armies. He also criticizes North Carolina and Pennsylvania for provisions in their constitutions that discourage but do not prohibit standing armies in peacetime.

Hamilton expresses support instead for the restriction in the proposed constitution: that the legislature be required to renew or abolish the army every two years. He deems the political process and challenge by the opposition, as well as that of the state governments, to be a sufficient check on this power. He says that military plots require time and are impossible to keep secret, allowing for many points where party control over the government can be broken or the government can be reformed. He concludes that the states will be easier to defend as a united government rather than in disunity.

== Background and publication ==
Federalist No. 26 was written by Alexander Hamilton. Following the Constitutional Convention in 1787, Hamilton worked with James Madison and John Jay to write a series of essays to explain the provisions of the Constitution of the United States and persuade New York to ratify it. They published these essays in New York newspapers under the shared pseudonym Publius. It first appeared in the Independent Journal on December 22, 1787, followed by the Daily Advertiser on December 24, and the New-York Journal and the New-York Packet on December 25. Federalist No. 26 continued the discussion of a standing army during peacetime that Hamilton began in No. 24 and No. 25 of the Federalist Papers. While No. 24 argued for the benefits of such an army and No. 25 argued that a federal standing army is superior to state armies, No. 26 argued against restricting the federal government's power to create such an army.

The debate of a standing army in peacetime existed since the Bill of Rights 1689 that effectively made the Kingdom of England a constitutional monarchy, in part by transferring power over peacetime armies to Parliament. The proposed constitution emulated this system by empowering the legislature with control over the funding of the military every two years. Hamilton's defense of a peacetime army under congressional regulation draws from political philosophy and from the experiences of the American Revolution. Opponents of a standing military during peacetime feared a reprisal of the military subjugation of state governments and American civilians as had occurred under the colonial rule of the British.

== Analysis ==
Federalist No. 26 was "an unreserved plea" by Hamilton for a stronger central government. He believed that restricting the legislature's ability to provide for defense was an emotional response instead of a rational one. His writing in this essay reflected his concern that liberty had been given too much emphasis in the American Revolution and that imbuing the federal government with too few powers made it impotent—concerns shared by fellow Federalist Papers authors James Madison and John Jay. The focus on the legislative rather than the executive reflected anti-federalist concerns that it was the legislature that was given too much power by the constitution. There was relatively little concern at the time of the president having significant control of the military.

The argumentation of Federalist No. 26 complies with Hamilton's support for centralized government. He challenges the notion that such a government is likely to restrict civil liberties using a standing military, and he considers it highly unlikely that such a thing could occur without being discovered early. He does, however, indicate that state governments are useful in challenging such an eventuality. Hamilton believed that representative governance and the requiring a renewal of military appropriations every two years, as was mandated by the proposed constitution, was sufficient to protect from any risks associated with a standing military. He considered the threat to public safety by restricting the legislature to be much greater than the threat of abuse of power.

Central to Hamilton's argument was his belief that the federal government would be representative of the people and that a federal legislature could be trusted with a standing military. Federalist No. 26 was one of the more populist of the Federalist Papers, contrasting with the elitism that is present in many others. Hamilton identifies the commoner as generally resistant to the "zeal for liberty" that leads to anarchy, noting that only two of the 13 state governments (North Carolina and Pennsylvania) expressly condemned standing armies during peacetime in their respective constitutions. He also believed that citizens were generally capable of discerning good leaders from bad ones and that citizens can be trusted to remove bad leaders from power when they do arise. This was also the only one of the Federalist Papers to give credence to the idea of political parties. Although he speaks of them dismissively, saying that they "must be expected to infect all political bodies", Hamilton acknowledges their role in challenging the majority.

== Aftermath ==
Hamilton continued his argumentation in favor of a standing federal army in No. 27 and No. 28 of the Federalist Papers. He argues in No. 27 that a federal army will bring more stability than state armies, and he argues in No. 28 that a federal army may be necessary to prevent insurgency. The legislature's power to maintain a standing army remained contested during the ratification process of the constitution and the drafting of the Bill of Rights. The relevant clauses of the constitution were ratified without amendment, but the debate contributed to the ratification of the Second Amendment to guarantee the right to keep and bear arms and the Third Amendment to prohibit the quartering of soldiers in peacetime.

In the 1957 Supreme Court case Reid v. Covert, Federalist No. 26 was one of the works cited by Justice Hugo Black in his plurality opinion to establish that the founding fathers intended for civilian control of the military. The federal maintenance of a standing army during peacetime eventually became a widely accepted idea in the United States, with a volunteer military and production of arms consistently maintained since World War II. No military coup has ever occurred in the United States.
