= Federalist No. 28 =

Federalist Paper by Alexander Hamilton

- Alexander Hamilton, author of Federalist No. 28
- Author: Alexander Hamilton
- Original title: The Same Subject Continued: The Idea of Restraining the Legislative Authority in Regard to the Common Defense Considered
- Language: English
- Series: The Federalist
- Publisher: The Daily Advertiser; The Independent Journal; The New-York Packet
- Publication date: December 28, 1787
- Publication place: United States
- Media type: Newspaper
- Preceded by: Federalist No. 27
- Followed by: Federalist No. 29
- Text: Federalist No. 28 at Wikisource

Federalist No. 28, titled "The Same Subject Continued: The Idea of Restraining the Legislative Authority in Regard to the Common Defense Considered", is a political essay by Alexander Hamilton and the twenty-eighth of The Federalist Papers. The essay was published on December 28, 1787, under the pseudonym Publius, the name under which all The Federalist Papers were published. This is the last of the three essays discussing the powers of the federal government over a standing military, directly following Federalist No. 26 and Federalist No. 27. Its theme of defense would be continued for one more essay in Federalist No. 29.

Federalist No. 28 addresses circumstances in which military force may be used domestically by the federal government, with Hamilton arguing that it would be necessary only when an insurrection required federal intervention. He challenged the idea that a federal military would be repressive, arguing that it would be restrained by the nature of representative government. Failing that, he believed that state governments and the people would be in an advantageous position over a federal military when engaging in the natural right to self-defense. Federalist No. 28 gave a more sympathetic portrayal of state governments than most of the Federalist Papers, describing them as a check on the federal government. Since the writing of this essay, the nature of military force has fundamentally changed, rendering his equivocation of federal, state, and civilian military technology obsolete.

== Summary ==
Hamilton begins by acknowledging truth in the argument that military force will sometimes be necessary in the course of governing, though he rejects the idea that it will be the standard method by which the law is enforced. He specifies that use of force by the federal government would only be necessary to suppress an insurrection that a state government could not control on its own, providing the Pennsylvania Mutiny and Shays' Rebellion as examples, as well as a potential conflict between New York and the Vermont Republic. He argues that a military is necessary for a country with representative government, or that it will be subject to the same instability that affected previous republics. Hamilton then proposes a scenario of several distinct confederacies of states, arguing that the same problem would still exist and that federal militaries would still be necessary. He uses this to demonstrate that combat readiness separate from militias will always be necessary, even if it does not take the form of a unitary government of all the states.

Hamilton next argues that the federal government would not be susceptible to tyranny because its components would be a representative government subject to the will of the people, rendering military repression of the people highly unlikely. In the event that such repression does occur, Hamilton argues that the right to self-defense would then take precedence. He says that the support of state governments and the entire population would make it easy to defend against the federal government, while the people of one state would be unable to defend against their state government. He describes the relationship of federal and state governments as one being a check on the other. Hamilton concludes that the practical aspects of military repression by the federal government make such concerns unreasonable.

== Background and publication ==
Federalist No. 28 was written by Alexander Hamilton. Following the Constitutional Convention in 1787, Hamilton worked with James Madison and John Jay to write a series of essays to explain the provisions of the Constitution of the United States and persuade New York to ratify it. They published these essays in New York newspapers under the shared pseudonym Publius. It was published in the Independent Journal, the Daily Advertiser, and the New-York Packet on December 28, 1787, and it was printed in the New-York Journal on January 2, 1788.

Federalist No. 28 continues the arguments about use of force by the government that began in Federalist No. 24, and it directly follows Federalist No. 27 in its rebuttal of the anti-federalist argument that the military will be used to enforce federal law. The essay also supported the theory posited by James Madison in Federalist No. 10, stating that "the obstacles to usurpation" increase with the increased extent of the state. Hamilton's views of the use of force in relation to governance may have been influenced by examples of tyrannical government and resistance against it, including the American Revolutionary War.

== Analysis ==
=== Use of force by the federal government ===
In Federalist No. 28, Hamilton concedes the point made by anti-federalists that there are times in which military force will be used to enforce federal law. He argues that these will be rare instances of true insurrection, and that military force in these instances is justified. Anti-federalists feared the federal use of the military as a form of political repression against the people. Hamilton approached the issue in this essay from a perspective of political realism, describing when such a contingency would be acceptable rather than denying it outright. He insists upon the use of military force to challenge an insurrection at the local level or a state government that becomes tyrannical. Much of his argumentation is in favor of the point that a federal military would supplement state militias that he considered ill-equipped to handle large-scale insurrections. He does not give credence to the idea that the military could be used against the entirety of the people, which he considers to be highly unlikely to ever occur. Overall, he places more trust in the use of force by the federal government than by that of state governments, reflecting his strong belief in centralized government. Hamilton also reiterates his support for representative government as the primary form of domestic security rather than codified restrictions on government or use of force against the government.

=== Use of force against the federal government ===
Hamilton maintains that the citizens have the final authority over the federal government, and should this authority be lost, then the citizens do have the right to exercise self-defense by engaging against the federal government in military conflict. This argument has been compared to the arguments made by political philosopher John Locke a century before. This applied in particular to the United States, as the large population and land area would make defense considerably easier than in a smaller country. Hamilton also proposes that the state governments would provide another advantage in such an event, as they would serve as a basis of coordination not possible by individual local governments. Despite Hamilton's insistence on the right to self-defense against a repressive government, this right is not mentioned in the United States Constitution, though it is mentioned in the preceding Declaration of Independence. As such, Hamilton's arguments are extralegal, pertaining to scenarios where federal law is no longer applicable.

Federalist No. 28 gives the broadest defense of state governments of any of the Federalist Papers, tasking them with the responsibility of serving as a check on the federal government. Hamilton specifies that this is only applicable in response to federal repression of the people, which he deems highly unlikely. In all other circumstances, he remains opposed to state action that exerts authority over the federal government, condemning such action in many other essays of the Federalist Papers. Hamilton also argues that if there is no federal military to serve as a check on the states, then the states would be better positioned to repress the people for the same reason that they would be able to resist a tyrannical federal government.

== Aftermath ==
Hamilton presented further argument about how the people would protect themselves from tyrannical government in Federalist No. 29, referencing the right to bear arms. The argument that states had the right to defend themselves from the federal government would later be invoked by those in favor of nullification or secession, though in these cases the argument was often made as one of legal rights rather than natural rights. Federalist No. 28 has been invoked in multiple Supreme Court cases to analyze Hamilton's view of the relationship between the military and the government. Justice Sandra Day O'Connor referenced it in the 1991 case Gregory v. Ashcroft, and Justice Antonin Scalia did so in the 2006 case Hamdan v. Rumsfeld.

Hamilton's arguments regarding the use of force may be reconsidered following the development of modern militaries and weapons of mass destruction in the 20th century. Particularly inapplicable to the 21st century is Hamilton's argument that state militias and private citizens would have access to the same military resources as the federal army. Hamilton's appeal to representative government has become the primary element of Federalist No. 28 that is applied to the present day.
