= Federalist No. 6 =

Federalist Paper by Alexander Hamilton

- Alexander Hamilton, author of Federalist No. 6
- Author: Alexander Hamilton
- Original title: Concerning Dangers from Dissensions Between the States
- Language: English
- Series: The Federalist
- Publisher: The Independent Journal
- Publication date: November 14, 1787
- Publication place: United States
- Media type: Newspaper
- Preceded by: Federalist No. 5
- Followed by: Federalist No. 7
- Text: Federalist No. 6 at Wikisource

Federalist No. 6, titled "Concerning Dangers from Dissensions Between the States", is a political essay written by Alexander Hamilton and the sixth of The Federalist Papers. It was first published in the Independent Journal on November 14, 1787, under the pseudonym Publius, the name under which all The Federalist Papers were published. It is one of two essays by Hamilton advocating political union to prevent the states from going to war with one another. This argument is continued in Federalist No. 7.

Federalist No. 6 argues that nations are predisposed to wage war against their neighbors as a natural effect of human nature. Hamilton counters the belief that republicanism and commerce prevent war by arguing that the leaders and citizens of a nation will act through passion over reason. The essay demonstrates Hamilton's opposition to direct democracy and his support for mercantilism. Federalist No. 6 makes extensive use of historical and contemporary examples, including particular focus on the Athenian statesman Pericles.

== Summary ==
Hamilton explains that in addition to external threats, the states may face threats from one another if they do not seek union. He says that there are many causes of war, including power, safety, trade rivalry, and personal gain for the leader. On the latter point, he warns that many leaders and other powerful figures have started wars for personal interest under the guise of public good. A series of examples follows, including Pericles and Thomas Wolsey, and he argues that mere familiarity with human nature leads one to understand this phenomenon.

Hamilton next challenges the idea that republicanism and commerce are enough to prevent war because of a mutual interest to avoid it. He counters that people are more commonly led by short-term passions than by long-term reason. He provides examples of republics that engaged in commerce and yet still frequently sought war: Sparta, Athens, Rome, Carthage, Venice, and Holland. He also identifies Great Britain as a country with semi-representative government and considerable investment in commerce, explaining that it is one of the most war-prone nations. He argues that war is just as popular among the people as it is among leaders.

From these points, Hamilton concludes that the states are no more likely to avoid war than any other nation. He identifies instances of unrest in the states as further evidence, concluding that only union can prevent conflict between the states.

== Background and publication ==
Federalist No. 6 was written by Alexander Hamilton. Following the Constitutional Convention in 1787, Hamilton worked with James Madison and John Jay to write a series of essays to explain the provisions of the Constitution of the United States and persuade New York to ratify it. They published these essays in New York newspapers under the shared pseudonym Publius. It was first published in the Independent Journal on November 14, 1787, followed by the Daily Advertiser on November 15 and the New-York Packet on November 16. Federalist No. 6 was published after the essays written by John Jay. Both present arguments for union between the states, but Jay argues that the states are natural allies while Hamilton warns that they risk being natural enemies.

== Analysis ==
=== International conflict ===
In Federalist No. 6, Hamilton argued that the states would engage in regular conflict if they were not unified. He wrote that this was likely to occur because it is individual human emotions that guide the histories of nations, and because proximity between nations naturally invites conflict between them. Hamilton posited that both individuals and groups experience passions and impulses, with those of groups being influenced by the group's leaders, and that these passions are led by a desire for power. He believed that while not all people would submit to these passions, most would.

Hamilton's argument in Federalist No. 6 contrasted with that of John Jay in the previous entries of The Federalist Papers. Though both advocated union between the states, Jay argued that the states were naturally unified through divine providence, while Hamilton warned that the states were predisposed to oppose one another if they did not unify. Hamilton dismissed the idea that the states could coexist peacefully as "utopian speculations". His argument lent itself to federalism, as he believed that a federal government would prevent the states from challenging one another as separate nations.

Hamilton also considered in Federalist No. 6 how global economic growth and commerce relate to conflict between nations. At the time that the Federalist Papers were written, political philosophers such as Montesquieu and Thomas Paine popularized the theory that republics engaged in commerce were unlikely to engage in war. Federalist No. 6 was a direct response to this argument. Hamilton was a mercantilist; he prioritized protectionism over free trade, and he opposed national economic interests. He rejected Montesquieu's stance, arguing that while commerce mitigated war in some ways, it incentivized it in others. He agreed that a strong economy encouraged peace in some ways: that it provided other venues of enrichment, it gave the people more to lose from war, and it increased the demands on armies as warfare became more complex. But he argued that despite these factors, such nations were still receptive to war. To provide evidence for this, he listed historical examples of nations that engaged heavily in commerce, such as the Dutch Republic and Great Britain, that nevertheless saw popular support for war.

=== Human nature ===
Federalist No. 6 presents a measured view of human nature that persists throughout the Federalist Papers. Hamilton explained his view that human vices and emotional impulses are often given precedence over long-term value or broader principles. He believed that the nature of one's best interest could be described as an objective truth, that this truth could be determined through reason, and that most people do not seek this truth. Hamilton and the other Founding Fathers feared as one of the nation's greatest threats that a leader would wage war to seek power and glory, prompting the separation of powers for declaring war and for waging war.

The contrast between reason and emotion in Federalist No. 6 reflects the arguments of The Federalist Papers more broadly: the authors argue throughout the series that their position is supported by reason, but that most people naturally prefer passion and self-interest. It is this view of human nature that, in the opinion of Hamilton and his co-authors, necessitates government. The argument made in Federalist No. 6 about human nature is a universal claim about humanity, applicable to all peoples and nations rather than being specific to the circumstances of the states. Hamilton's description of humanity choosing passion over reason resembles the state of nature as described by Thomas Hobbes, applied to national relations as well as individual relations.

Hamilton's perception of humanity is indicative of the federalists' opposition to direct democracy. At the time, democracy was associated with mob rule. He rejected the exceptionalist idea of a political "golden age" in which the American people would be so wise and virtuous as to rise above their passions, calling it a "deceitful dream". He instead sought a practical form of government that took such passions into consideration. This was in opposition to his Federalist Papers co-author John Jay, who trusted the people to generally make good decisions despite their proclivity toward self-interest. Hamilton's description of government also challenged the traditional conception of republicanism as described by Montesquieu, which emphasizes civic virtue as a defining attribute. Hamilton instead accepted a flawed republicanism in which citizens are not expected to possess "perfect wisdom and perfect virtue".

=== Use of historical precedent ===
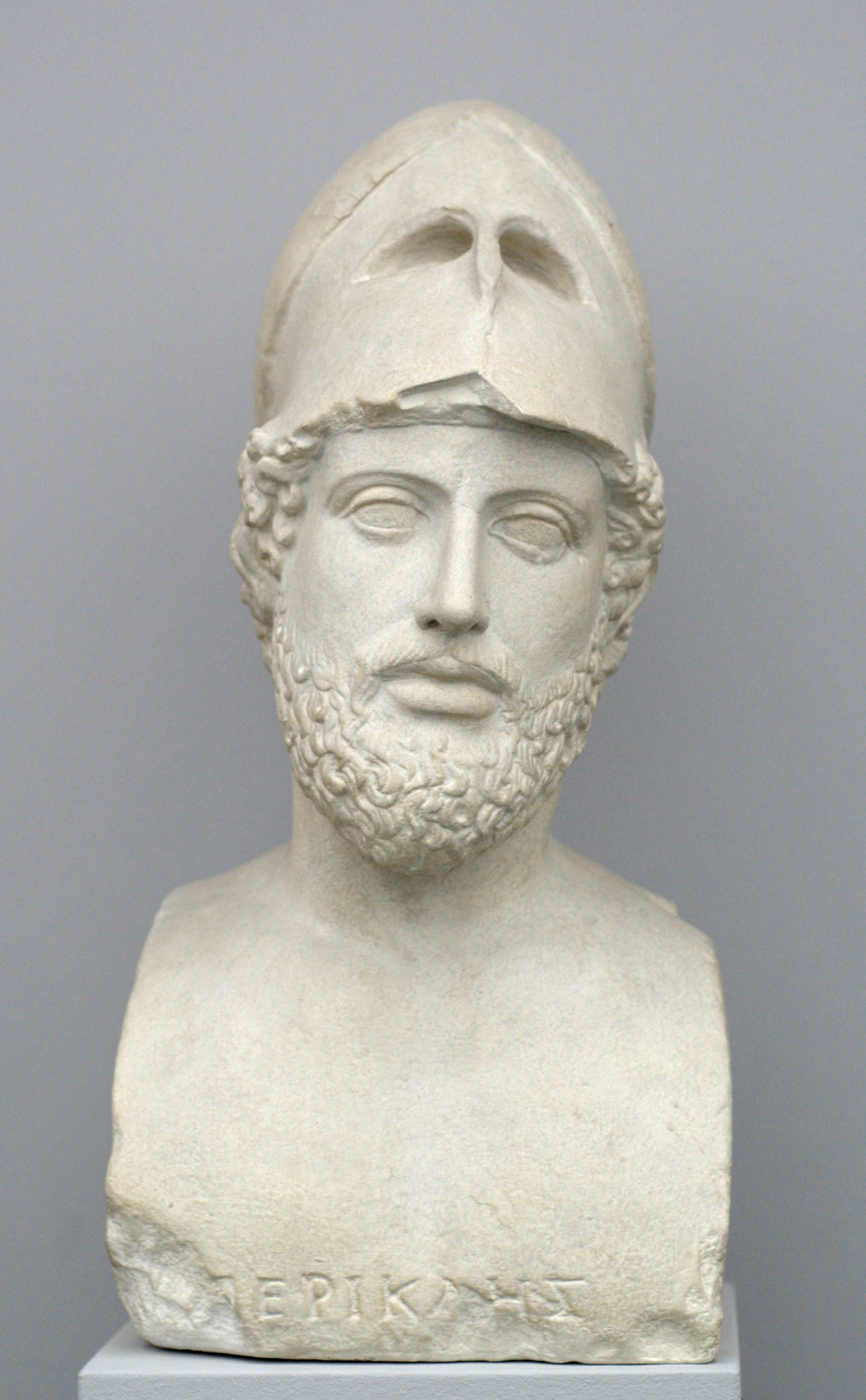
Hamilton described the actions of Pericles to demonstrate that the passions of leaders may lead their nations into war, even when it is not in their best interest.

Hamilton described several historical figures that he believed caused harm to nations through passion and self-interest. He used the example of Pericles to justify his argument that nations are ultimately led by human nature. He presented the actions of Pericles as described by Plutarch's Life of Pericles, arguing that Pericles's self-interest caused the destruction of Samos and incited the Peloponnesian War. This reflects one of the interpretations described by Plutarch, though Hamilton did not address a second, more prominent interpretation that it was public distrust of Pericles that caused harm. The invocation of Pericles may also be interpreted as a challenge to the idea of civic virtue; Pericles is associated with the concept, and using him as an example of a ruler driven by passion indicates a failure of civic virtue to maintain a republic.

Hamilton's invocation of republics such as Rome and Sparta invokes the ideas of Montesquieu and Niccolò Machiavelli, who argued that a balance of democracy and aristocracy was necessary to moderate the republic. These philosophers warned that without such moderation, inclinations toward war and conquest would lead to the fall of a republic. Hamilton also used examples from his own time: he described the Regulator Movement, the Pennsylvania Mutiny of 1783, and Shays' Rebellion as examples of unrest within the states.

Hamilton's use of experiential evidence in Federalist No. 6 is an example of his general alignment with the philosophy of David Hume. The essay presents an argument that aligns with Hume's empiricism, the belief that truth is determined by happenings and experiences rather than by deduction and logical axioms. Rather than define human nature on specific criteria, Hamilton defines it by describing a pattern, listing nations throughout history that were affected by individuals engaging in self-interest. He also used an a priori argument based on experiential evidence in the vein of Hume, suggesting that anyone who has observed human nature can naturally assume that it would affect history in this way.

== Aftermath ==
Federalist No. 6 is followed by Federalist No. 7, which continues on the same subject of potential war between the states. Political scientist Michael Zuckert described Federalist No. 6 as "one of the classic essays of the series." James Madison revisited the idea of human nature causing division in Federalist No. 10. Madison presented an empirical argument similar to Hamilton's, though he emphasized an a priori argument from human nature rather than providing examples. Both authors proposed in their respective essays that the best interest of a nation was an objective truth that could be determined through reason. The idea challenged by Hamilton in this essay—that commerce-based republics were less likely to engage in war—developed over the modern era into democratic peace theory. With the advent of globalization, the concept of "neighboring nations" has changed, and the arguments presented by Hamilton about neighboring nations may be interpreted more broadly and applied to all nations.
