= Federalist No. 7 =

Federalist Paper by Alexander Hamilton

- Alexander Hamilton, author of Federalist No. 7
- Author: Alexander Hamilton
- Original title: The Same Subject Continued: Concerning Dangers from Dissensions Between the States
- Language: English
- Series: The Federalist
- Publisher: The Independent Journal
- Publication date: November 15, 1787
- Publication place: United States
- Media type: Newspaper
- Preceded by: Federalist No. 6
- Followed by: Federalist No. 8
- Text: Federalist No. 7 at Wikisource

Federalist No. 7, titled "The Same Subject Continued: Concerning Dangers from Dissensions Between the States", is a political essay by Alexander Hamilton and the seventh of The Federalist Papers. It was first published in the Independent Journal on November 17, 1787, under the pseudonym Publius, the name under which all The Federalist Papers were published. It is one of two essays by Hamilton advocating political union to prevent the states from going to war with one another. Federalist No. 7 continues the argument that was developed in Federalist No. 6.

Federalist No. 7 provides several examples of disputes that Hamilton argues will cause war between the states if they do not unify under a federalist government. It presents arguments for why territorial disputes, commercial policy, public debt, and violation of private contracts would cause war between the states. Though such a war is no longer recognized as a significant possibility in the 21st century, Federalist No. 7 describes many economic issues that have continued relevance to interstate commerce.

== Background and publication ==
Federalist No. 7 was written by Alexander Hamilton. Following the Constitutional Convention in 1787, Hamilton worked with James Madison and John Jay to write a series of essays to explain the provisions of the Constitution of the United States and persuade New York to ratify it. They published these essays in New York newspapers under the shared pseudonym Publius. It was first published in the Independent Journal on November 17, 1787, followed by the Daily Advertiser on November 19 and the New-York Packet on November 20. Federalist No. 7 directly continues the argument of Federalist No. 6 regarding the likelihood of war between the states.

== Summary ==
Hamilton begins by stating his belief that the states will engage in war if they are not unified. He then provides examples of what may cause such wars. First, he describes territorial disputes as the most common cause of war. He says that the undeveloped territory to the west would likely be contested, and that previous territorial disputes between the states had already demonstrated the willingness of states to oppose one another over territory.

Second, Hamilton suggests commerce as a cause of war. He warns that the states would have competing economic interests, and that some states are in more advantageous positions to impose duties on the others. Third, he identifies the states' collective public debt as a point of dispute. The states have been unable to agree on apportionment or whether the debts are urgent, and Hamilton speculates that any agreement would be unfair to some states. Finally, he says that states may cause conflict by passing laws in violation of private contracts. Hamilton concludes that without union, the states will eventually fall under the influence of European nations and go to war with one another.

== Analysis ==
Federalist No. 7 presented arguments in favor of a federal government by describing potential sources of conflict between the states. Hamilton believed that the states were susceptible to the same types of conflict as any nation, and that this risk necessitated the creation of a strong federal government to resolve disputes between the states. This federal government would ensure that the same rules of commerce were applied equally to all of the states. Hamilton warned of the risk that should the states fail to unify, foreign nations would seek to gain influence over the states by turning them against one another. Hamilton's argument followed that of John Jay in earlier essays, who argued that the American people were naturally connected under a shared identity. Federalist No. 7 may be read as highlighting the danger of such a connection. In Hamilton's view, this shared identity would exacerbate tensions if there is no federal government.

Hamilton believed that the Articles of Confederation were unable to resolve disputes over western territory. This had already become a point of contention between the states by the time Hamilton wrote Federalist No. 7, and it was accompanied by other territorial disputes between the states, including disputes over the Wyoming Valley and the Vermont Republic. When these disputes were resolved in court, the decision often favored one state over another, causing animosity.

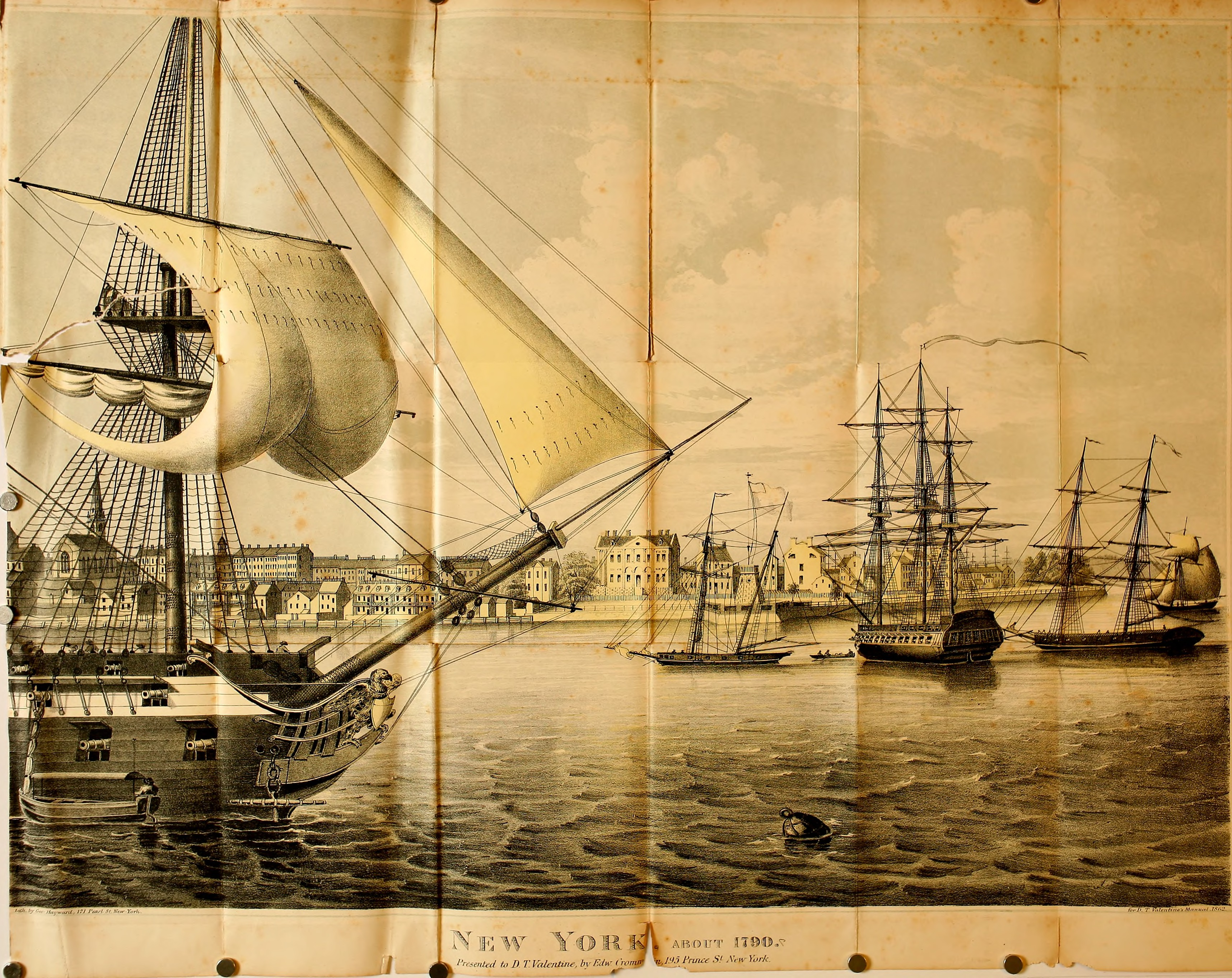
New York Harbor in 1790: Hamilton feared that New York's location would allow it to impose stronger duties on other states, inviting conflict.

Hamilton believed that a centralized commercial policy was necessary to ensure that commerce and duties were uniform between the states and that no state could implement a trade policy that harmed another state. While it was commonly held that mutual economic interests would prevent conflict, Hamilton countered that the economic policies of one state may negatively affect other states, prompting conflict between them. Of particular concern to Hamilton was that certain states, such as New York, held a geographic advantage that allowed them disproportionate control over interstate trade and engage in practices such as tax exportation. The proposed constitution included a Commerce Clause to address these concerns, giving power over interstate and foreign commerce to the United States Congress. In line with Hamilton's concerns, a common interpretation of this clause is that it effectively created a free-trade zone between the states to prevent them from engaging in trade wars. Advocates of deregulatory policies, such as constitutional law professor Michael Greve and economics professor Daniel L. Smith, have proposed that federalism promotes economic competition between the states to the benefit of the citizens.

The United States accumulated significant public debt during the Revolutionary War. There was disagreement as to who was responsible for paying the debt, and the Articles of Confederation had no mechanism to compel payment by the states. The proposed constitution authorized Congress to pay debts, and it included an Engagements Clause that affirmed the validity of previously accumulated debts. Hamilton also described the "violation of private contracts" between citizens of separate states as a potential source of conflict.

Hamilton described the states as naturally seeking war if there was no moderating centralized government; this description is derived from the ideas of Thomas Hobbes. Hobbes argued that humanity without government existed in a hypothetical state of nature, in which each person is threatened by everyone else they met. The solution proposed by Hobbes was the "Leviathan state" that could exercise any powers necessary to guarantee security. Likewise, Hamilton's description of the states' political relations being defined by geography is reminiscent of Montesquieu's belief that the fate of a nation is determined by "geography and climate".

== Aftermath ==
The system of federalism implemented by the constitution allowed the states to maintain their own independent economies in addition to the national economy, particularly after the ratification of the Tenth Amendment. Economic competition between the states has remained common throughout American history, though the focus shifted from tariffs to subsidies, federal government spending, and benefits for businesses. States also frequently collaborate when developing commerce policies to gain mutual benefit. Tax exportation has also become a common practice in domestic American commerce. The dispute over the American frontier was resolved as the states agreed to cede their western territories to the federal government, eventually allowing for the creation of new states. In the 21st century, war between the states is no longer considered a likely possibility.
