= Federalist No. 29 =

Federalist Paper by Alexander Hamilton "Concerning the Militia"

- Alexander Hamilton, author of Federalist No. 29
- Author: Alexander Hamilton
- Original title: Concerning the Militia
- Language: English
- Series: The Federalist
- Publisher: The Independent Journal
- Publication date: January 9, 1788
- Publication place: United States
- Media type: Newspaper
- Preceded by: Federalist No. 28
- Followed by: Federalist No. 30
- Text: Federalist No. 29 at Wikisource

Federalist No. 29, titled "Concerning the Militia", is a political essay by Alexander Hamilton and the twenty-ninth of The Federalist Papers arguing for the ratification of the United States Constitution. It was first published in Independent Journal on January 9, 1788, under the pseudonym Publius, the name under which all The Federalist Papers were published. Though it was the thirty-fifth by order of publication, it was placed after Federalist No. 28 when they were compiled, making it the final essay in a set about the national military.

Federalist No. 29 argued in support of national regulation of militias, saying that it was necessary for them to operate effectively. It challenged arguments that this power would be abused, saying that militiamen would represent their states instead of the nation and using militias for tyrannical purposes would be ineffective. The essay was written in a more hostile tone toward Hamilton's opponents, accusing them of being disingenuous. Since the publication of The Federalist Papers, debate around militias has centered on gun politics in the United States and interpretations of the treatment of militias in the Second Amendment to the Constitution.

== Summary ==
Publius begins by saying that the national government must be able to regulate state militias if they are to be efficient. He challenges the suggestion that a militia must remain independent to prevent it from supplementing the national standing army, saying that increased national use of militias would reduce the influence of the standing army. He criticizes those who say both that the national government will have unchecked power and that it will have no power to raise a citizen militia through posse comitatus; he casts both as untrue.

To address concerns about impressionable young men joining a militia and being swayed by the national government, Publius offers what he would say to a legislator representing New York. Here he says that full national control over militiamen would be unrealistic because it would require taking away large portions of the working population for training. He instead proposes a select group of well-trained militiamen, which will be more useful and also more effective in protecting citizens from overreach by the army.

Publius questions whether his opponents are being honest in their arguments or simply unreasonable, saying that militiamen will not turn against those whom they live alongside and the officers of the militia will be chosen by their own states. He provides examples of unreasonable assignments and movements that would move militias around the country and into France and the Netherlands, suggesting that his opponents are trying to convince the people that these are realistic possibilities. Publius then argues that using the militia for tyrannical purposes would only cause the militia to oppose the government. He concludes by saying that without national oversight of the militia, the states would not be ready to intervene on behalf of another as internal dangers grow.

== Background and publication ==
Federalist No. 29 was written by Alexander Hamilton. Following the Constitutional Convention in 1787, Hamilton worked with James Madison and John Jay to write a series of essays to explain the provisions of the Constitution of the United States and persuade New York to ratify it. They published these essays in New York newspapers under the shared pseudonym Publius. It was published in the Independent Journal on January 9, 1788. It was then printed in the Daily Advertiser on January 10, the New-York Packet on January 11, and the New-York Journal on January 12.

Though it is now titled Federalist No. 29, it was initially the thirty-fifth essay of the Federalist Papers. It was listed as No. 29 when the essays were collected in a single volume, placing it alongside the entries about the military. Federalist No. 24 through No. 28 had addressed the issue of a national standing army. Hamilton and his co-writers presented a disciplined military as a virtue, which meant that less consideration was given to amateur militias prior to Federalist No. 29.

The Federalist Papers were written shortly after the American Revolutionary War, where state militias had earned the goodwill of citizens by fighting for American independence. The division of power between the federal government and the state governments prevented the former from holding a total monopoly over the use of force, which made the question of militias relevant when drafting a new constitution.

== Analysis ==
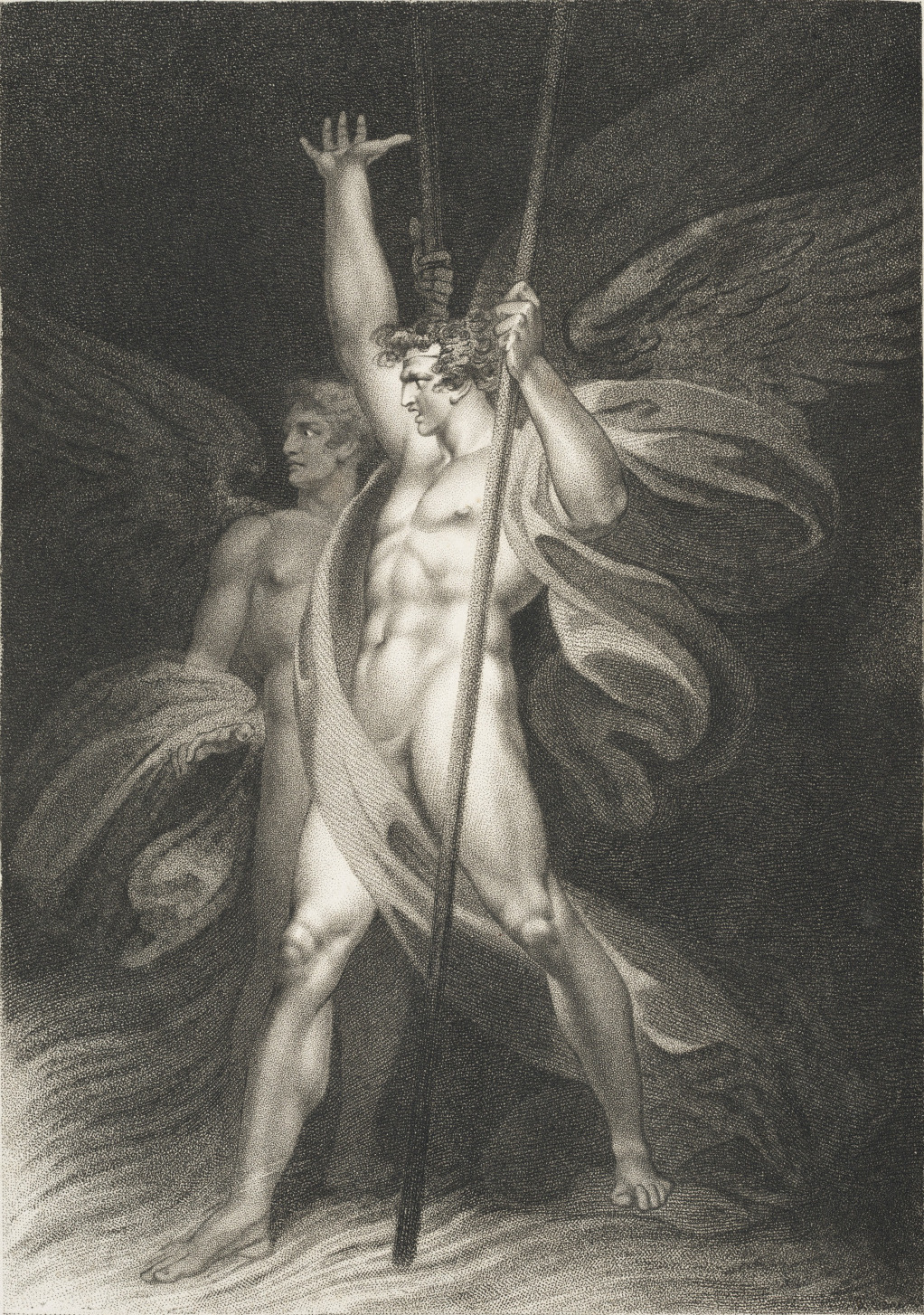
Hamilton's reference to Paradise Lost likened the arguments of the Anti-Federalists to the corrupting influence of demons.

In Federalist No. 29, Hamilton sought to justify the utilization of state militias by a national government. His position was that organizing defense at the national level would be more efficient than managing several distinct armies. To address concerns about the national government abusing its power over militias, Hamilton argued that members of a militia were firstly serving on behalf of their own states and communities, and they would pledge allegiance to their respective states over the national government. As the interests of the militia would closely align with those of other citizens in their states, they would remain loyal and serve as a measure of protection against tyranny. Hamilton envisioned a more select group of trained individuals to serve in militias, allowing them to work more efficiently without requiring all citizens to train and maintain readiness at the cost of productivity. As these groups would reflect the common sentiments of the people, they would effectively serve as a representative group in martial affairs, reminiscent of the governmental representation in the legislature. He assured his opponents that the power over appointing officers of the militia would remain with the states.

As the constitution would give Congress power over military affairs, opponents of the proposed constitution were concerned that states would be unable to maintain their own militias. Cato of the Anti-Federalist Papers, which argued against ratification of the constitution, opposed any national control of militias and warned that it could induce tyranny. Hamilton took a provocative, mocking tone in his response, making more direct attacks on opponents of the constitution by questioning their motives and suggesting that their arguments about national control of militias was not worth taking seriously. In his argument, he referenced the epic poem Paradise Lost, which tells the story of Lucifer's fall. He used it to warn that the pessimism and distrust inspired by the Anti-Federalist arguments would cause people to see "gorgons, hydras, and chimeras dire". This likened the Anti-Federalists to the devils in Paradise Lost who sought to wage war against Heaven by creating these same images and corrupting humanity.

== Aftermath ==
Federalist No. 29 was the final essay in a series about military governance within the Federalist Papers. The authority of individual states became less relevant after the American Civil War in the 1860s. After this, citizens of the United States began to see themselves as a single nation rather than separate states working in unison. In the Supreme Court, Federalist No. 29 was first invoked by Joseph Story in a footnote in Martin v. Mott (1827), making it one of only three Federalist Papers to be cited in a majority opinion by the end of the Marshall Court. It was later cited among other Federalist Papers by Levi Woodbury in Luther v. Borden (1849).

Since The Federalist Papers were written, discourse about militias in the United States has become closely tied with gun violence in the United States and the broader environment of American gun politics. A right to resist against the government is sometimes cited by proponents of gun ownership to support their position. The Second Amendment to the Constitution addressed militias directly. Its clause describing "a well regulated militia" became a point of legal contention in the context of gun control, presenting a dispute as to whether a militia was a prerequisite to gun ownership or if it applied to all citizens in addition to militias. The Supreme Court ruled that it extends beyond militias in District of Columbia v. Heller (2008).
