= Federalist No. 47 =

Federalist Paper by James Madison

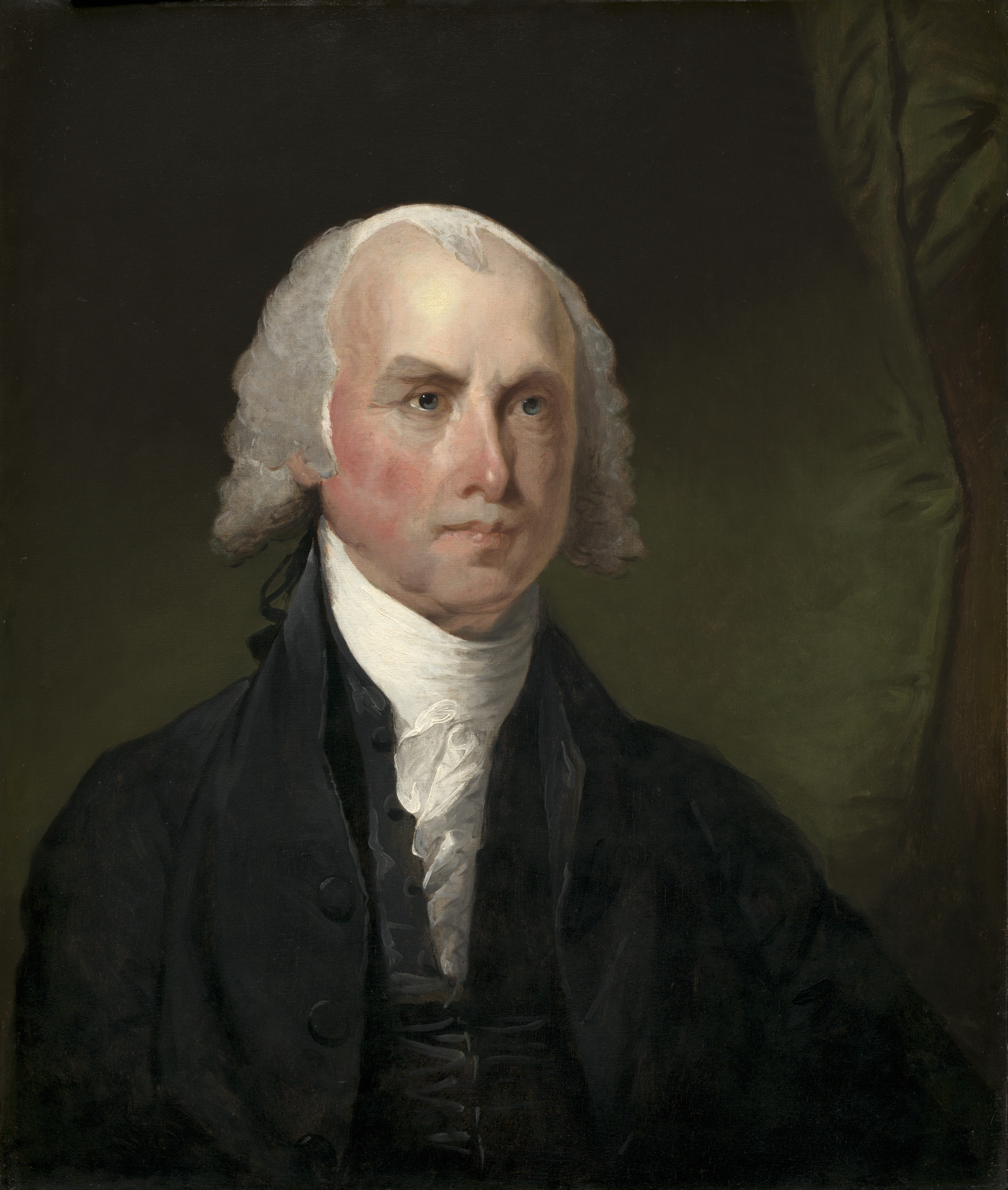
- James Madison, author of Federalist No. 47
- Author: James Madison
- Original title: The Particular Structure of the New Government and the Distribution of Power Among Its Different Parts
- Language: English
- Series: The Federalist
- Publisher: New York Packet
- Publication date: January 30, 1788
- Publication place: United States
- Media type: Newspaper
- Preceded by: Federalist No. 46
- Followed by: Federalist No. 48

Federalist No. 47 is the forty-seventh paper from The Federalist Papers. It was first published by The New York Packet on January 30, 1788, under the pseudonym Publius, the name under which all The Federalist Papers were published, but its actual author was James Madison. This paper examines the separation of powers among the executive, legislative, and judicial branches of government under the proposed United States Constitution due to the confusion of the concept at the citizen level. It is titled "The Particular Structure of the New Government and the Distribution of Power Among Its Different Parts".

== Summary ==
Like the other Federalist Papers, No. 47 advocated the ratification of the United States Constitution. In No. 47, Madison attempted to refute critics who feared that the Constitution would not sufficiently protect the separation of powers among the executive, judiciary, and legislature. Madison acknowledged that separation of powers was "one of the principal objections inculcated by the more respectable adversaries to the Constitution" and that "no political truth is certainly of greater intrinsic value." He also stated that "the accumulation of all powers, legislative, executive, and judiciary, in the same hands, whether of one, a few, or many, and whether hereditary, self-appointed, or elective, may justly be pronounced the very definition of tyranny."

However, Madison explained his use of separation of powers using a number of references to the philosopher Montesquieu, whom Madison claimed was to the British Constitution as Homer is to epic poetry. Montesquieu spent twenty years writing his best literary work, and one of the most detailed works in the history of law, The Spirit of Law (1748). This publication focused on three topics: class of government, separation of powers, and political climate.

Montesquieu intended that the work focus on the science of law, and thus a lack of spirituality occurred. He made up for this deficiency by filling in historical information. He reasoned that history was the only true proof of cause and effect, as he viewed law as an "application of reason". Montesquieu claimed in The Spirit of Law that committing to liberty was equal to success. Here he focused on separation of powers. Montesquieu believed that the only way to liberty was through the proper installment of separation of powers. He modeled this belief on his love for the English government. Separation of powers was the equivalent of prosperity to him.

Madison states Montesquieu used the British government as an example of separation of powers to analyze connections between the two. Madison quotes Montesquieu in The Spirit of Law as saying the British are the "mirror of political liberty." Thus, Montesquieu believed that the British form of separation of powers was of the utmost caliber.

Madison continued by showing that the branches of the British government are not completely separate and distinct. He explained how the monarch (executive branch) cannot pass a law solely, but has the power of veto, can create foreign sovereigns, and that he/she cannot administer justice, but appoints those who do. He continued by examining how judges can exercise no executive or legislative action but may be advised by the legislative counsel. He expressed how the legislature can do no judiciary act, but can remove judges upon agreement from both houses, can do no executive actions, but constitutes the magistracy and has the power of impeachment.

From this analysis, Madison showed how each branch is interconnected with one another. Madison also inferred that when Montesquieu wrote, "There can be no liberty where the legislative and executive powers are united in the same person, or body of magistrates… if the power of judging be not separated from the legislative and executive powers" he did not mean there was to be no "partial agency." The idea that each branch would stand alone to solely deal with its responsibilities is one that Madison believed to be impractical and non-beneficial, which is supported by his findings.

After the American Revolution, many Americans were wary of a too-powerful government. To avoid dictatorship, separation of powers was instilled in the political system. "Diversifying the voices heard in government not only helps to prevent one point of view from becoming too strong, but also promotes the affirmative goal of democratizing governmental decision-making."

Madison took a different perspective regarding separation of powers at this point in the paper and considers them as more a system of "checks and balances" as he addresses the states' constitutions. Madison wrote there was "not a single instance in which the several departments of power have been kept absolutely separate and distinct" when he examined each constitution. Madison made a few exceptions when reviewing each state in No. 47. Massachusetts's constitution agreed with Montesquieu on the separation of powers as it did not state a clear disconnect between the three branches but contained partial agencies. New York's had no declaration on the subject even though they did not have total separation either. Madison overlooked Rhode Island and Connecticut when discussing the constitutions but reasoned that it was due to their constitution's installment before the revolution. For all the remaining states (New Jersey, Pennsylvania, Delaware, Maryland, Virginia, North Carolina, South Carolina, and Georgia), their constitutions were contradictory about separation of powers. Each state had a similar thesis on the topic, such as New Hampshire's, which stated "Powers ought to be kept as separate from, and independent of, each other as the nature of a free government will admit." However, each state's legislature appointed its executive, each state's legislature had impeachment authority and appointed the judiciary members, except for Maryland's in which the executive appointed the judiciary.

The use of the Montesquieu maxim in 1776 calls into question the discrepancy between the affirmations of the need to separate the several government departments and the actual political practice the state governments followed. Madison believed that the fundamental principle of their constitutions was violated, and wished not to be seen as disapproving the states' governments, but wanted to draw attention to the inconsistency taking place, and the unjustified scrutiny upon the new constitution.
