= Federalist No. 43 =

Federalist Paper by James Madison

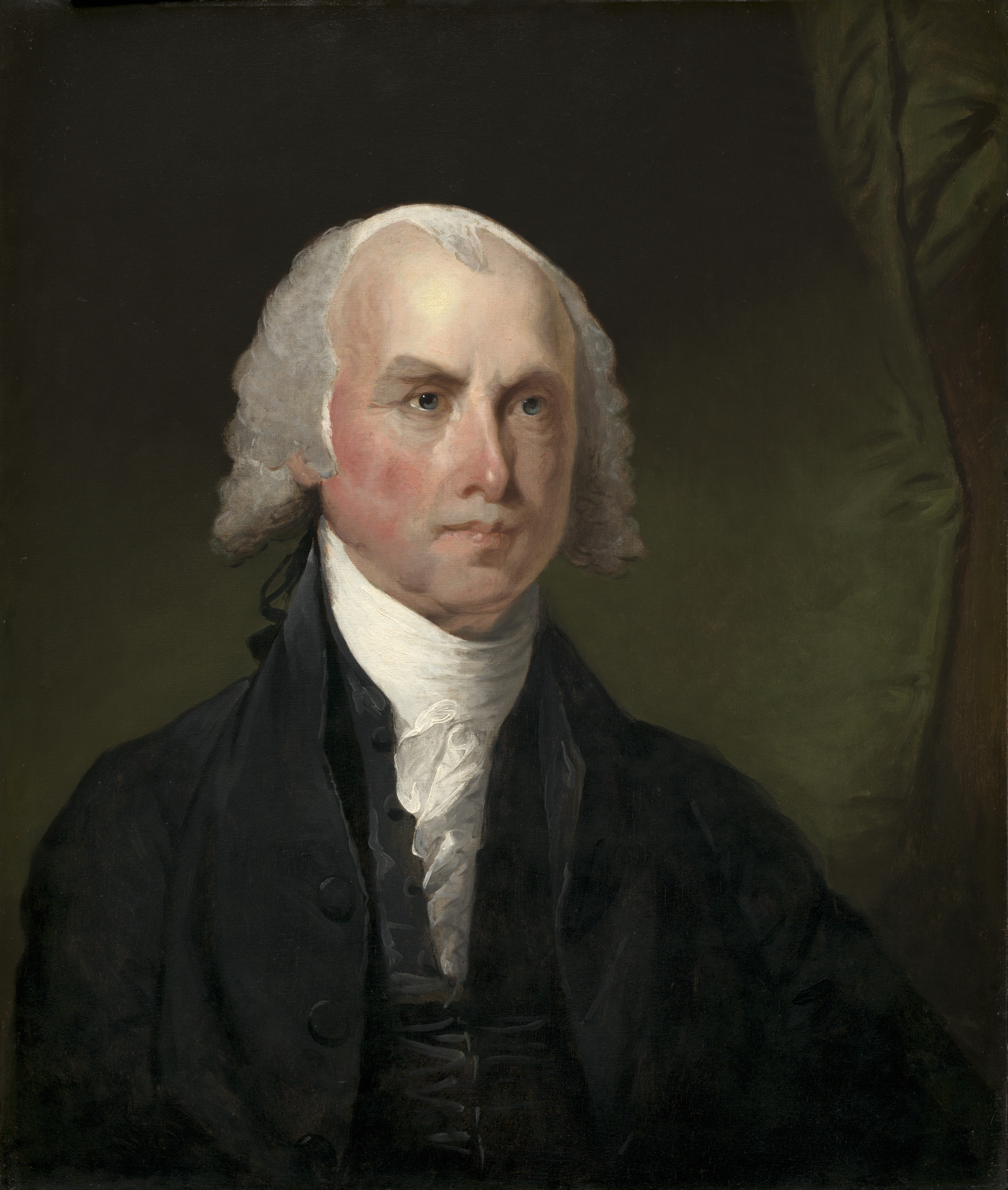
- James Madison, author of Federalist No. 43
- Author: James Madison
- Original title: The Same Subject Continued: The Powers Conferred by the Constitution Further Considered
- Language: English
- Series: The Federalist
- Publisher: New York Packet
- Publication date: January 23, 1788
- Publication place: United States
- Media type: Newspaper
- Preceded by: Federalist No. 42
- Followed by: Federalist No. 44

Federalist No. 43 is an essay by James Madison, the forty-third of The Federalist Papers. It was first published by The New York Packet on January 23, 1788, under the pseudonym Publius, the name under which all The Federalist papers were published. This paper continues a theme begun by Madison in Federalist No. 42. It is titled "The Same Subject Continued: The Powers Conferred by the Constitution Further Considered".

The paper contains the only reference to the Copyright Clause in The Federalist Papers. In the brief discussion of the clause, Madison states that "the utility of this power will scarcely be questioned." He also notes the Framer's intent for the federal government to have the power to enact patent and copyright laws. Despite its perfunctory discussion of the clause, the Paper remains one of the few sources describing the rationales and motivations for the language and intent of the clause.

The essay also references a desire that the national government be given exclusive jurisdiction over a new national capital and provides the rationale for what later became the District Clause of Article I of the U.S. Constitution. The essay references "sufficient inducements of interest to become willing parties to the cession" to be offered by the state ceding land for the federal district to the inhabitants of the ceded territory and that the citizens in the federal district "will have had their voice in the election of the government which is to exercise authority over them." This assertion is often cited in the efforts for DC Home Rule and DC Statehood.

It also deals with the Treason Clause of the U.S. Constitution.
