= Federalist No. 44 =

Federalist Paper by James Madison on State restrictions

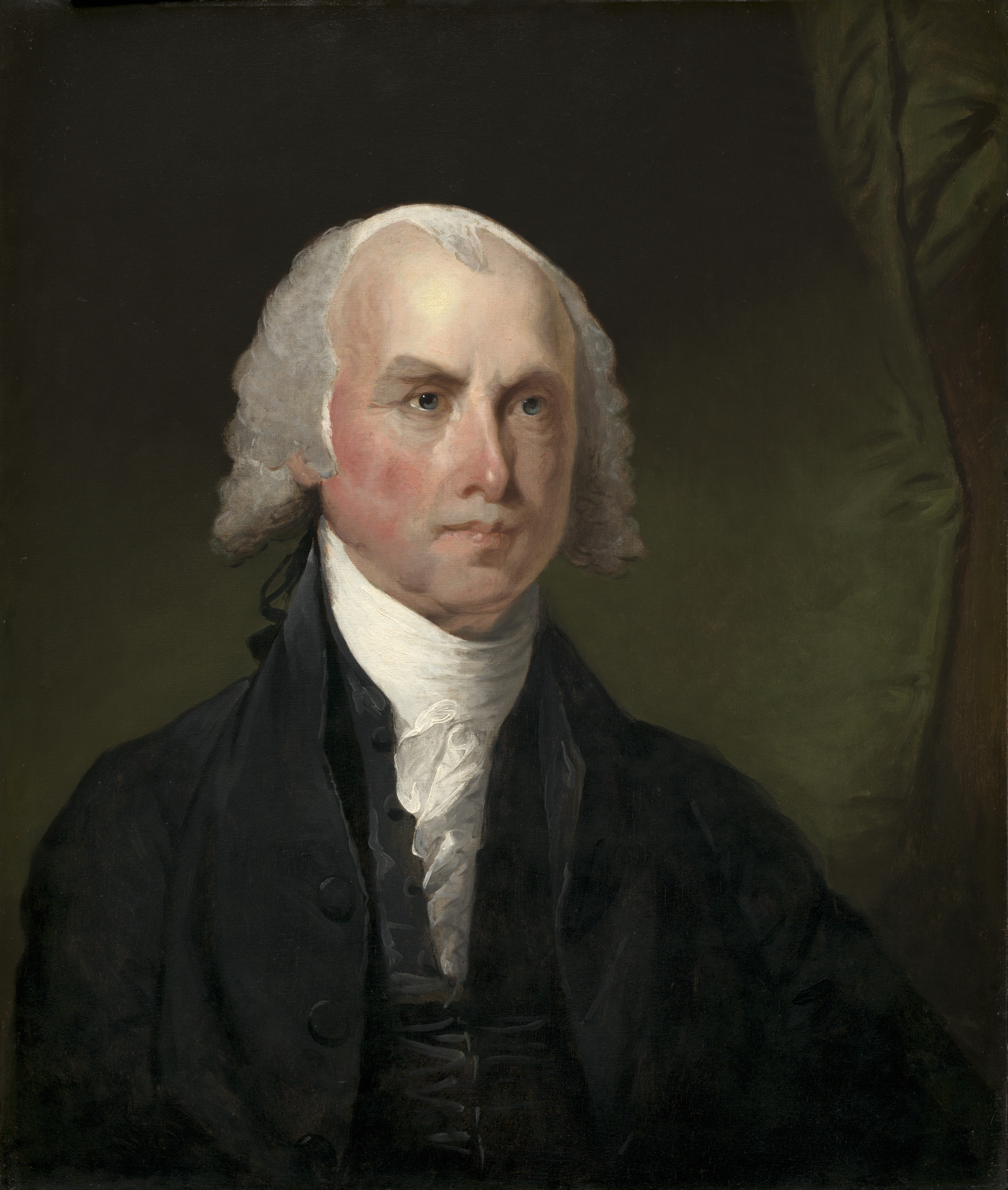
- James Madison, author of Federalist No. 44
- Author: James Madison
- Original title: Restrictions on the Authority of the Several States
- Language: English
- Series: The Federalist
- Publisher: New York Packet
- Publication date: January 25, 1788
- Publication place: United States
- Media type: Newspaper
- Preceded by: Federalist No. 43
- Followed by: Federalist No. 45

Federalist No. 44 is an essay by James Madison, the forty-fourth of The Federalist Papers. It was first published by The New York Packet on January 25, 1788 under the pseudonym Publius, the name under which all The Federalist papers were published. This essay addresses the Constitution's limitation of the power of individual states, something strongly decried by the Anti-Federalists, who sought a greater degree of sovereignty for the states. It is titled "Restrictions on the Authority of the Several States".

== Overview ==
In this essay, Madison justifies many parts of the Constitution, specifically those sections which limit the powers of the states, give Congress full authority to execute its powers and establish the Constitution as the supreme law of the land.

His discussion begins with article 1, section 10 (which limits the powers of individual states), wherein he justifies the outlawing of state sponsored privateering as consistent with not allowing states to conduct their own foreign policy, which could lead to great mischief.

He then expounds upon why states should not be allowed to mint their own currencies or issue paper money, saying that multiple currencies would cause confusion and discrepancies, hurt citizens and fuel animosity between the states. He condemns the state issuance of paper money by citing the problems caused by this after the peace in 1783 (paper money issued by the states led to runaway inflation).

Madison vigorously defends the outlawing of bills of attainder, ex post facto laws and laws impairing the obligations of contracts. He insists that such laws would contradict basic principles of sound legislation, and of the social compact itself by allowing a capricious congress to remove basic individual rights and security.

Madison then argues at length for the Necessary and Proper Clause, noting that no part of the constitution had come under more attack. He states flatly that the clause is "invulnerable" and that without it the constitution would be a "dead letter." He says that the Constitution might have listed or enumerated those necessary and proper powers or attempted to list those that were expressly not necessary and proper, but argues that either exercise would have been futile in that no list could ever fully take into account all of the nation's present and future concerns.

He responds to critics who feared that the clause would allow the government to overstep its powers that the people would have the same redress to this as to any occasion on which the legislature abused its powers: the balance of the executive and legislative branches, and the potential to remove the offending legislators via the ballot box.

Madison similarly defends the Supremacy Clause as vital to the functioning of the nation. He notes that state legislatures were invested with all powers not specifically defined in the constitution, but also said that having the federal government subservient to various state constitutions would be an inversion of the principles of government, comparing it to having the brain subservient to limbs of the body.

Finally he speaks to the importance of having both state and federal legislators and judicial officers swear an oath to the constitution, noting that the federal government is dependent upon the states to carry out policy
