= Martin v. Mott =

- Supreme Court of the United States

Argued January 17, 1827 Decided February 2, 1827
- Full case name: Martin, Plaintiff in Error, v. Mott, Defendant in Error
- Citations: 25 U.S. 19 (more)

Case history
- Prior: New York Supreme Court rules for Mott; brought to court on appeal.

Holding
- Mott had no legal standing to disobey orders to assemble; President holds power to declare exigencies.

Court membership
- Chief Justice John Marshall Associate Justices Bushrod Washington · William Johnson; Gabriel Duvall · Joseph Story; Smith Thompson · Robert Trimble

Case opinion
- Majority: Story, joined by unanimous

Martin v. Mott, 25 U.S. 19 (1827) was a United States Supreme Court case concerning the president of the United States’ emergency powers and the authority to activate state militias for federal service. The court heard the case of Jacob E. Mott, a militia private who disobeyed orders to mobilize for service during the War of 1812 and then appealed his subsequent court-martial. The court's ruling against Mott had a significant impact on executive powers during national emergencies, according to legal scholars, and has been used to interpret the Insurrection Act of 1807.

== Background ==
Congress passed the Militia Act of 1792 which outlined the President’s authority to call up state militias to federal service. This act was further amended by the Militia Act of 1795 which stated:

"[T]hat whenever the United States shall be invaded, or be in imminent danger of invasion from any foreign nation or Indian tribe, it shall be lawful for the president of the United States to call forth such number of the militia of the state or states most convenient to the place of danger, or scene of action, as he may judge necessary to repel such invasion, and to issue his order for that purpose to such officer or officers of the militia as he shall think proper."

In order to provide manpower for the United States in the war of 1812, Daniel D. Tompkins, the governor of New York, mustered forces from the New York state militia at the direction of President James Madison who was acting under the auspices of the Militia Act of 1795. Jacob E. Mott, a private in the militia, refused directives from the governor to assemble in support of this war effort. Mott was not alone in his actions as thousands of other militiamen refused this call to service for varying reasons. In 1818, Mott appeared before a court-martial in Poughkeepsie on charges of disobeying orders. He was found guilty and fined $96. Unable to pay the court-ordered fine, Mott’s property, a single horse, was seized. The seizure of this property was carried out by Martin, a deputy U.S. marshal who Mott then sued in a replevin action.

Appealing his case, Mott argued that he could not be tried for disobeying orders because the President lacked the authority to assemble state militias and order them to address exigencies such as invasion or insurrection. He also argued that his court-martial had been unjust and unnecessary as never having been in federal service he could not be tried under the authority of the United States. The New York Supreme Court agreed with Mott on several counts and abdicated the court-martial's ruling on the grounds that it was convened improperly, and the existence and legality of President Madison’s orders to muster the New York state militia were dubious. The case was appealed to the United States Supreme Court and hearings began in 1827.

== Ruling ==
The Supreme Court’s jurisdiction over the suit was laid out by Justice Joseph Story who established that because the authorities of the United States government were being challenged, the court could decide on the case. In his final opinion, Story ruled against Mott on several grounds including that the President’s authority to call up state militias for service was his alone as outlined in the Militia Acts and the authority to declare an exigency also fell with the President. He wrote that the President’s command of the military, including militias called into federal service, was necessary to combat foreign invasions. Additionally, Story dismissed the claims that Mott’s court-martial was illegitimate by stating that the President’s call to assemble state militias, though transmitted through a state authority, is a federal directive.

== Effects ==
Martin v. Mott's finding that the President is the final decision on whether an emergency has arisen in the United States has had noteworthy consequences on discussions surrounding the executive’s emergency powers. Legal scholars at the Brennan Center for Justice have stated that the ruling has the effect of allowing the President to invoke the Insurrection Act of 1807 freely as it is within presidential authority to determine what constitutes an ‘insurrection’, ‘rebellion’, ‘domestic violence’, or other exigency that may require military forces.

== See also ==
- Insurrection Act of 1807
- Militia Acts
- War of 1812
- Federalist No. 29
