= Federalist No. 42 =

Second most-cited Federalist Paper; by James Madison

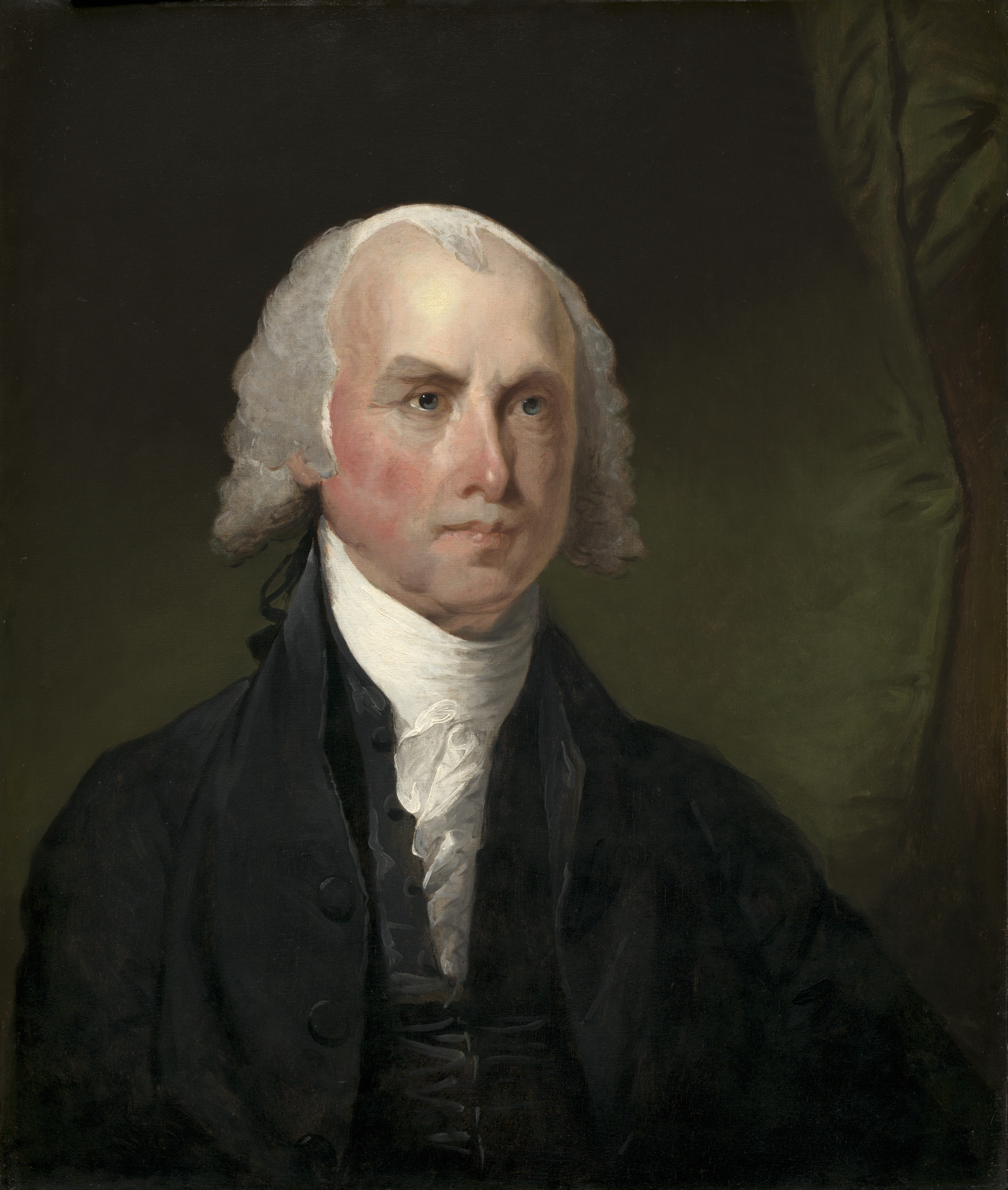
- James Madison, author of Federalist No. 42
- Author: James Madison
- Original title: The Powers Conferred by the Constitution Further Considered
- Language: English
- Series: The Federalist
- Publisher: New York Packet
- Publication date: January 22, 1788
- Publication place: United States
- Media type: Newspaper
- Preceded by: Federalist No. 41
- Followed by: Federalist No. 43

Federalist No. 42 is an essay by James Madison, and the forty-second of The Federalist Papers. It was first published by The New York Packet on January 22, 1788 under the pseudonym Publius, the name under which all The Federalist papers were published. Federalist No. 42 continues a theme that was started in Federalist No. 41, and is titled "The Powers Conferred by the Constitution Further Considered".

Here, Madison contends that the grant of specific powers to the federal government actually operates to limit the power of the federal government to act with respect to the states.

== The question ==
In Federalist No. 41, Madison had delineated six classes of power granted to the federal government:

1. Security against foreign danger;
2. Regulation of intercourse with foreign nations;
3. Maintenance of the harmony and proper intercourse among the States;
4. Miscellaneous objects of general utility;
5. Restraining the States from certain injurious acts;
6. Provisions for giving due efficacy to all of these powers

Madison returns in Federalist No. 42 to classes two and three.

== Influence ==
The Federalist, No. 78 (which deals with judicial powers, including the power of judicial review) has found its way most often into written opinions of the justices. The Federalist, No. 42 (which focuses on non-military congressional powers, including the power to regulate interstate commerce) is the second most cited.
