= Center for Individual Rights =

American nonprofit public interest law firm

- Abbreviation: CIR
- Formation: 1988
- Founder: Michael McDonald and Michael Greve
- Type: Public interest law firm
- Tax ID no.: 52-1600481
- Legal status: 501(c)(3) non-profit
- Purpose: To provide representation on issues of significant public interest
- Location(s): 1100 Connecticut Ave. NW, Washington, DC 20036
- Coordinates: 38.9065°N 77.0445°W
- Region served: United States
- Methods: Litigating and publicizing individual cases
- President: Todd F. Gaziano
- Board of directors: Jeremy A. Rabkin (Chairman); Larry P. Arnn (President of Hillsdale College)
- Revenue: $2.8 million (2024)
- Expenses: $2.3 million (2024)
- Website: www.cir-usa.org

The Center for Individual Rights (CIR) is a non-profit public interest law firm in the United States. Based in Washington, D.C., the firm is "dedicated to the defense of individual liberties against the increasingly aggressive and unchecked authority of federal and state governments". The Center is officially nonpartisan. Its work focuses on enforcement of constitutional limits on state and federal power, primarily through litigation.

CIR's primary focus for most of its existence has been challenges to what it regards as unconstitutional or unlawful preferences based on race, sex, or another identity group. It has represented members of many races but is best known for challenging affirmative action. Another major focus for CIR is free speech. It has represented individuals and groups, often in university environments, challenging attempts to interfere with speech deemed "politically incorrect". A third focus has been federalism, the attempt to prevent Congress from legislating beyond the powers provided to it in the Constitution.

== Institutional mission ==
CIR was incorporated in November 1988 and began operations in April 1989. Its name was chosen to underscore that its objective would be to defend individual liberties, broadly understood to encompass both civil and economic rights. Its founders, Michael McDonald and Michael Greve had previously worked together at the conservative Washington Legal Foundation. McDonald, an attorney, specialized in First Amendment litigation. wrote on environmental issues and assisted with WLF's fundraising.

CIR involves itself almost exclusively in litigation. It does not lobby Congress nor involve itself it the regulatory process. It does not have a large membership base to influence legislation or engage in fundraising. It has, however, aligned itself with several referendum movements to end State use of racial preferences.

From the outset, CIR specialized in a small number of areas of litigation: free speech and civil rights being the two most important. Unlike traditional liberal groups, CIR found its niche primarily in challenging racial preferences in favor of minorities also called affirmative action, government regulation, unconstitutional state action, and other similar entanglements.

Like its more avowedly liberal counterparts, CIR provides free legal representation to clients who cannot otherwise afford or obtain legal counsel and whose individual rights are threatened. It is funded primarily from individuals and foundations who favor its goals.

== Cases ==
CIR's primary focus has been on civil rights cases and First Amendment cases involving freedom of religion and free speech. It has also been involved in several cases involving federalism.

=== Civil rights ===
CIR's most notable cases were Gratz v. Bollinger and Grutter v. Bollinger, challenges to the University of Michigan's policies giving preference to minority applicants to its undergraduate college (Gratz) and its law school (Grutter). CIR began litigation in 1997. The final Supreme Court opinions were delivered in 2003. Having failed to get the Court to ban use of race in admissions, CIR provided legal support for the Michigan Civil Rights Initiative and has brought subsequent challenges to the University's continuing use of racial preferences in admissions.

The two Michigan cases capped a series of cases around the country, challenging discriminator admissions systems at various universities. Two other key cases were Hopwood v. Texas where the Court of Appeals for the Fifth Circuit banned racial preferences at the University of Texas. Another case, Smith v. Univ. of Washington in the 9th Circuit upheld use of racial preferences in admissions.

CIR has also challenged numerous university programs which excluded non-minorities. For example, in Doe v. Department of Health and Human Services CIR ended the practice of excluding all non-minorities summer study program at Texas A&M University, a program funded in part by the National Institutes of Health. Similarly in Smith v. Virginia Commonwealth University CIR represented a high school student banned from attending a summer journalism workshop when it was determined he was white. In Tompkins v. Alabama State University CIR represented a black student challenging an all-white scholarship at a traditionally black university.

In another case that reached the Supreme Court, CIR participated in the voting rights case of Reno v. Bossier Parish in which the Department of Justice refused to provide pre-clearance for a state redistricting plan which expanded minority districts because the DOJ felt even more minority districts could be created. The Court held that DOJ could not deny pre-clearance to redistricting plans that did not show a discriminatory intent and which did not reduce the number of minority districts.

CIR represented Ultima Services Corporation in challenging the constitutionality of the Small Business Administration's (SBA) 8(a) Business Development Program's use of racial classifications. In September 2023, CIR filed a motion seeking additional equitable relief, advocating for a complete prohibition on awarding 8(a) contracts within the administrative and technical support industry, explicitly including contracts awarded to entities owned by Alaska Native Corporations and Indian tribes. The following month, CIR further argued that contracting advantages for Alaska Native Corporations constituted racial classifications and urged the court to reject the government's narrower interpretation of the initial injunction.

In the case of Davis v. Guam, CIR partnered with Gibson Dunn and the Election Law Center to represent Arnold Davis, a resident challenging Guam's race-based voting restrictions. The Ninth Circuit Court of Appeals ruled that limiting voting rights to "Native Inhabitants of Guam" violated the Fifteenth Amendment. Subsequently, the District Court of Guam awarded $947,717 to cover the legal costs incurred by CIR, Gibson Dunn, and the Election Law Center.

=== First Amendment ===
In Rosenberger v. University of Virginia, CIR represented a student newspaper denied University funding because of the religious content of the paper. Wide Awake was a student run newspaper with a Christian perspective. Despite University funding for a wide range of student groups, including Jewish and Muslim groups, the University categorically denied funding for Wide Awake, arguing it would violate the Establishment Clause. The Supreme Court disagreed, holding that by funding a wide range of groups, the University could not discriminate by excluding religious organizations from funding eligibility.

Building on Rosenberger CIR brought a second case on behalf of Columbia Union College. The school challenged a Maryland Program which provided private colleges and universities with funds based on the number of students they taught. Numerous Catholic colleges received funding but CUC (run by Seventh Day Adventists) was deemed "pervasively sectarian" or too religious. The United States Court of Appeals for the Fourth Circuit found that CUC was entitled to equal access to funding.

CIR has also brought a number of cases in lower courts challenging use of racial or sexual harassment codes to silence University Professors, students, and others who have challenged politically correct ideas or used other language considered controversial. It has brought cases against the University of Oklahoma, the University of New Hampshire and California Polytechnic State University. Most of these cases are settled quickly in CIR's favor and have not gone to trial.

Another area of focus has been defending citizens protesting various political matters who have been sued by entities arguing that their protests or criticism were civil right violations. For example, in White v. Lee, CIR defended a neighborhood group who opposed the conversion of hotel into a homeless shelter. Their peaceful protests involved leafleting to let neighbors know of the plan and speaking out at public meetings. After a complaint was filed by the developer of the project the Department of Housing and Urban Development began an investigation threatening fines of up to $50,000 each for obstructing housing for the disabled (since recovering alcoholics and drug addicts who would live in the shelter were defined as disabled). The Court of Appeals for the Ninth Circuit upheld the principle that civil rights laws could not be used to stifle legitimate political debate of these matters. CIR has brought similar cases on behalf of protesters against the City of Fresno and the District of Columbia.

=== Federalism ===
CIR also brought an important federalism case in United States v. Morrison. In that case, a female student at Virginia Tech accused several football players of rape but a grand jury found insufficient evidence to prosecute. The student brought a challenge in federal court under the newly enacted Violence Against Women Act, a recent law giving women the right to bring such actions. CIR represented one of the football players arguing that the alleged non-economic activity had little relation to interstate commerce, arguing that Congress lacked authority under the Commerce Clause to regulate non-economic activity. The Court agreed and found that portion of VAWA to be beyond Congressional authority.

== Staff ==
Both of CIR's founders, McDonald and Greve, have moved on to other projects. CIR's current president is Todd Gaziano.

CIR's litigation docket is run by the General Counsel, Michael Rosman, a graduate of Yale Law School and former attorney with the New York Law firm of Rosenman & Colin. He joined CIR in 1994.

== See also ==
- Alliance Defending Freedom, formerly the Alliance Defense Fund – a similar project
