= Federalist No. 40 =

Federalist Paper by James Madison regarding mixed government

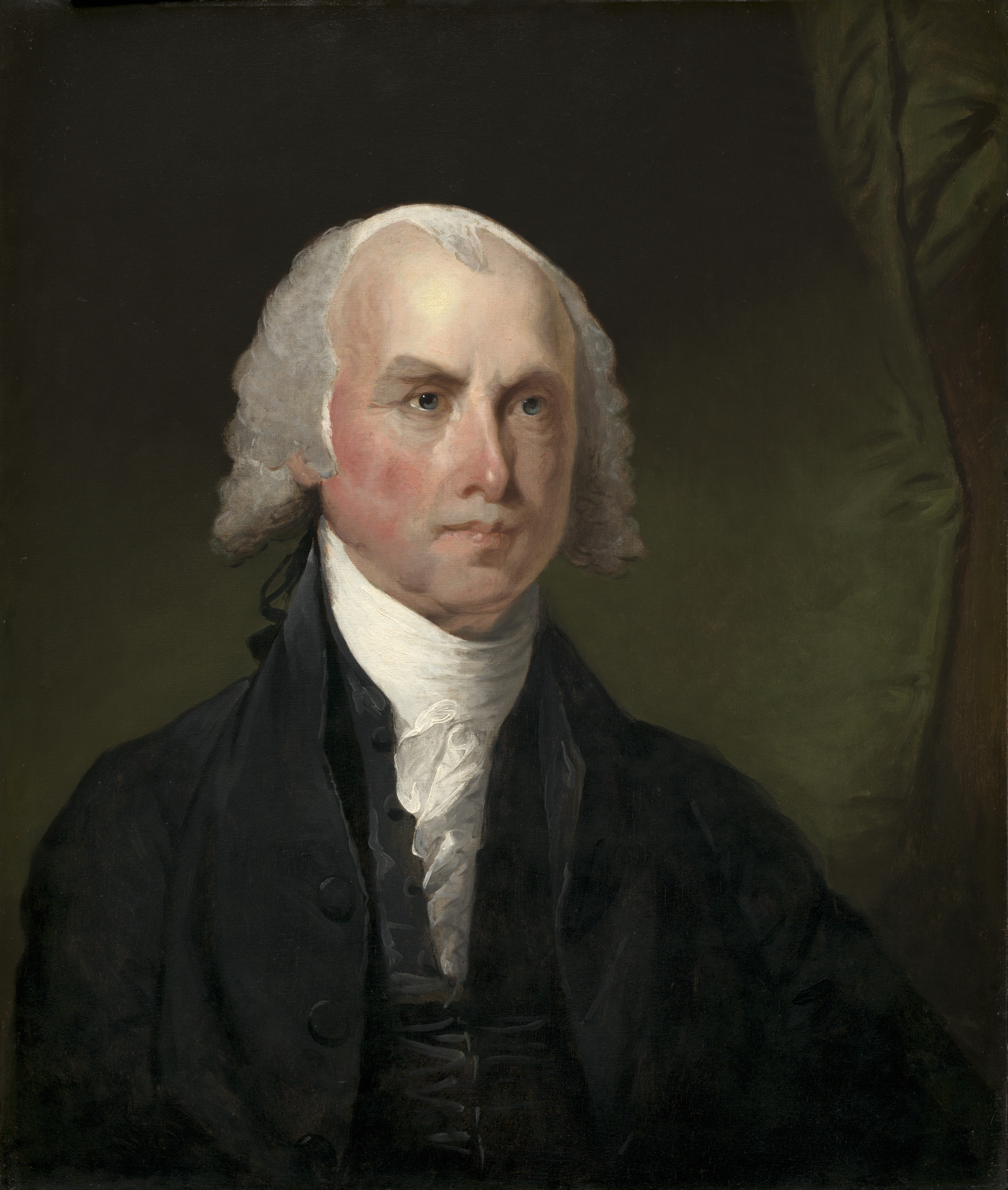
- James Madison, author of Federalist No. 40
- Author: James Madison
- Original title: The Powers of the Convention to Form a Mixed Government Examined and Sustained
- Language: English
- Series: The Federalist
- Publisher: New York Packet
- Publication date: January 18, 1788
- Publication place: United States
- Media type: Newspaper
- Preceded by: Federalist No. 39
- Followed by: Federalist No. 41

Federalist No. 40 is an essay by James Madison, the fortieth of The Federalist Papers. It was first published by The New York Packet on January 18, 1788, under the pseudonym Publius, the name under which all The Federalist papers were published. This is the last of four papers by Madison examining the authority of the constitutional convention that had produced the proposed United States Constitution. It is titled "The Powers of the Convention to Form a Mixed Government Examined and Sustained".
