= Michael Greve =

American academic

Michael S. Greve is a professor at the George Mason University School of Law. Previously, he served as the John G. Searle Scholar and Director of the Federalism Project at the American Enterprise Institute. He is also a member of the board of directors of the Competitive Enterprise Institute. Greve's research interests include federalism, constitutional law, environmental policy, and Internet regulation.

Previously, Greve founded and, from 1989 to February 2000, directed the Center for Individual Rights (CIR), a public interest law firm. CIR served as counsel in many precedent-setting constitutional cases, including United States v. Morrison (2000), a key Supreme Court verdict on federalism. Greve earned his Ph.D. in Government from Cornell University in 1987. He has commented on constitutional and administrative law, environmental policy, civil rights, and federalism.

== Bibliography ==
- The Upside-Down Constitution. Harvard University Press, 2012. ISBN 9780674061910
- Environmental Politics: Public Costs, Private Rewards. Preager, 1992. ISBN 0-275-94238-4 (edited with Fred L. Smith, Jr.)
- Competition Laws in Conflict: Antitrust Jurisdiction in the Global Economy. AEI, 2004. ISBN 0-8447-4201-5 (edited with Richard Epstein)
- The Demise of Environmentalism in American Law. AEI, 1996. ISBN 0-8447-3980-4
- Real Federalism: Why It Matters, How It Could Happen. AEI, 1999. ISBN 0-8447-4099-3
