= Federalist No. 46 =

Federalist Paper by James Madison

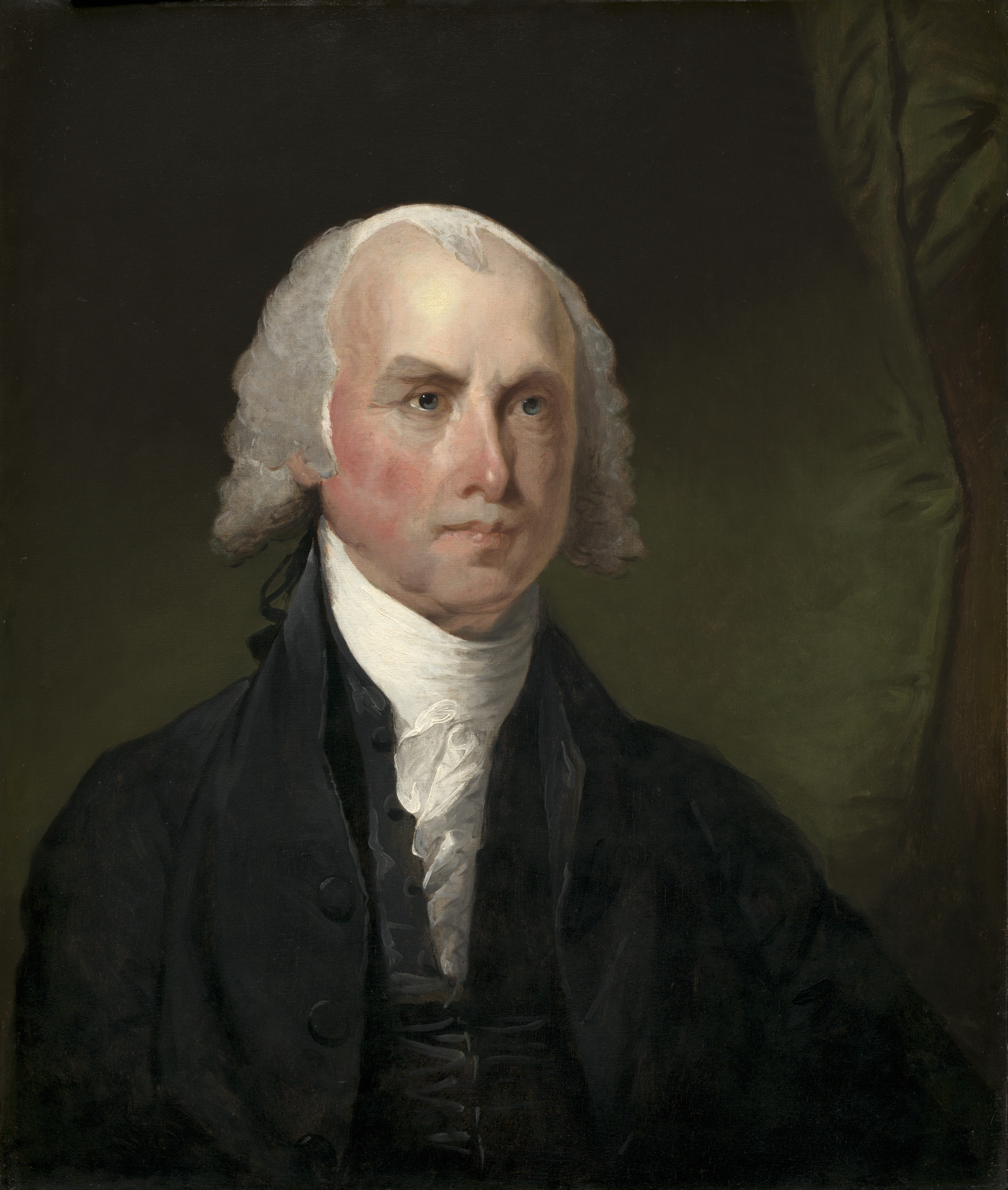
- James Madison, author of Federalist No. 46
- Author: James Madison
- Original title: The Influence of the State and Federal Governments Compared
- Language: English
- Series: The Federalist
- Publisher: New York Packet
- Publication date: January 29, 1788
- Publication place: United States
- Media type: Newspaper
- Preceded by: Federalist No. 45
- Followed by: Federalist No. 47

Federalist No. 46 is an essay by James Madison, the forty-sixth of The Federalist Papers. It was first published by The New York Packet on January 29, 1788, under the pseudonym Publius, the name under which all The Federalist papers were published. This essay examines the relative strength of the state and federal governments under the proposed United States Constitution. It is titled "The Influence of the State and Federal Governments Compared".

Madison reaffirmed the arguments made in previous papers by Alexander Hamilton. In this paper, Madison asserts the advantages that state governments have over the federal government in terms of securing the support of the people and resisting encroachments.

In previous papers Madison labored to convince his readers that the system proposed by the constitution would lead to stable and energetic government. However, he describes at length in this paper a series of hypothetical conflicts between state and federal government. Madison does not expect or hope the constitution to lead to the kind of conflict between state and federal authority described here. Rather, he seeks to rebut the arguments that he anticipates from opponents of the constitution by asserting that their "chimerical" predictions of the federal government crushing state governments are unfounded.

Madison reminds his audience that the American people are the common superior of both the federal and state governments. He stresses that the Federal and State governments have differing powers, and are both subjected to the ultimate control of the voters.

== Background ==
The functions of the state government are similar but on different scales to pertain to the correct groups of people. State government is typically more focused on the issues of their state constituents and their legislation deals more with people on a personal level. Some problems that the state deals with for citizens are criminals who break state regulations; divorce and family matters; real estate; and medical issues from work, road accidents, or medical malpractice. As for the federal government, they have a large spectrum of citizens so they control larger affairs such as federal taxes, immigration, bankruptcy, social security, and patent/copyright laws. There is a separation between the two governments when it comes to responsibilities because of how far their influences spread. This separation was the original design for the U.S. government but over time as its responsibilities remained virtually the same, its interactions increased.

Although federal government has more power, it relies on state government. Further explaining the dependency federal and state governments have on each other, Madison stated in Federalist Paper No.46, "...I propose to compare the federal and state governments, are the disposition and the faculty they may respectively possess, to resist and frustrate the measures of each other. It has been already proved that the members of the federal will be more dependent on the members of the State governments, than the latter will be on the former."

The general population of the 1780s, as mentioned prior, favored state government. As explained, "It is also assumed that the lives and interests of the people will be provided for by the States and therefore the people will be more friendly and conversant with those in the State Government." Even though the federal government was supposed to be a mold for the foundation of state government, the people would still be biased to the liking of the state and its roles.

Once it became time to begin creating new republics, the people feared going back to the monarchy they once lived under by Great Britain. The Declaration of Independence describes that "free and Independent States they have full power to levy war, conclude peace, contract alliances, establish commerce, and to do all the other things which independent States may of right do." It is understood why monarchy was such a large concern considering the freedoms gained from being set apart from it.

The military and militia were also discussed greatly in Federalist Paper 46. Because of the people leaning away from the federal government and towards the state government, the military and militia were used as a security for civilians. The restriction of the military and the excessive buffer of militia gave an upper hand towards the state government to defend themselves from the potentially more powerful federal government if they ever chose to step over their boundaries, into the states territory of power.

== Military and militia ==
During the ratification debate, many feared that the federal government would become too powerful and too similar to the monarchy in Great Britain. While writing Federalist No. 46, James Madison calculated that the federal standing army should be limited to a maximum of 30,000 troops. This force, supplemented by state militias, would be sufficient to defend the United States against foreign invasions; and when necessary for national security, these combined forces would be called into service under the President’s authority as Commander in Chief. Madison intended this limitation to prevent the federal military from becoming large enough to threaten state sovereignty during peacetime. Madison also believed that the people, in cooperation with their state governments, would be more likely to unite against federal overreach than to align with the federal government against a defiant state. This arrangement was designed to protect the citizenry from being threatened by hostile foreign governments' standing armies, as Great Britain had done when it sent battalions to America. Consequently, Madison encouraged the states to maintain an aggregate militia of at least 500,000 citizens to safeguard the general welfare.

Extravagant as the supposition is, let it however be made. Let a regular army, fully equal to the resources of the country, be formed; and let it be entirely at the devotion of the federal government; still it would not be going too far to say, that the State governments, with the people on their side, would be able to repel the danger. The highest number to which, according to the best computation, a standing army can be carried in any country, does not exceed one hundredth part of the whole number of souls; or one twenty-fifth part of the number able to bear arms. This proportion would not yield, in the United States, an army of more than twenty-five or thirty thousand men. To these would be opposed a militia amounting to near half a million of citizens with arms in their hands, officered by men chosen from among themselves, fighting for their common liberties, and united and conducted by governments possessing their affections and confidence. It may well be doubted, whether a militia thus circumstanced could ever be conquered by such a proportion of regular troops. Those who are best acquainted with the last successful resistance of this country against the British arms, will be most inclined to deny the possibility of it. Besides the advantage of being armed, which the Americans possess over the people of almost every other nation, the existence of subordinate governments, to which the people are attached, and by which the militia officers are appointed, forms a barrier against the enterprises of ambition, more insurmountable than any which a simple government of any form can admit of. Notwithstanding the military establishments in the several kingdoms of Europe, which are carried as far as the public resources will bear, the governments are afraid to trust the people with arms. And it is not certain, that with this aid alone they would not be able to shake off their yokes. But were the people to possess the additional advantages of local governments chosen by themselves, who could collect the national will and direct the national force, and of officers appointed out of the militia, by these governments, and attached both to them and to the militia, it may be affirmed with the greatest assurance, that the throne of every tyranny in Europe would be speedily overturned in spite of the legions which surround it.

== Anti-Federalist views ==
The Anti-Federalists believed that the Constitution would only ruin America and their view of what it could be. Their fears manifested off of the belief that the Constitution would give the federal government too much power, take away their rights as American born citizens, as well as give the federal government complete control over the judicial system, making it less personal.
