= Federalist No. 41 =

Federalist Paper by James Madison

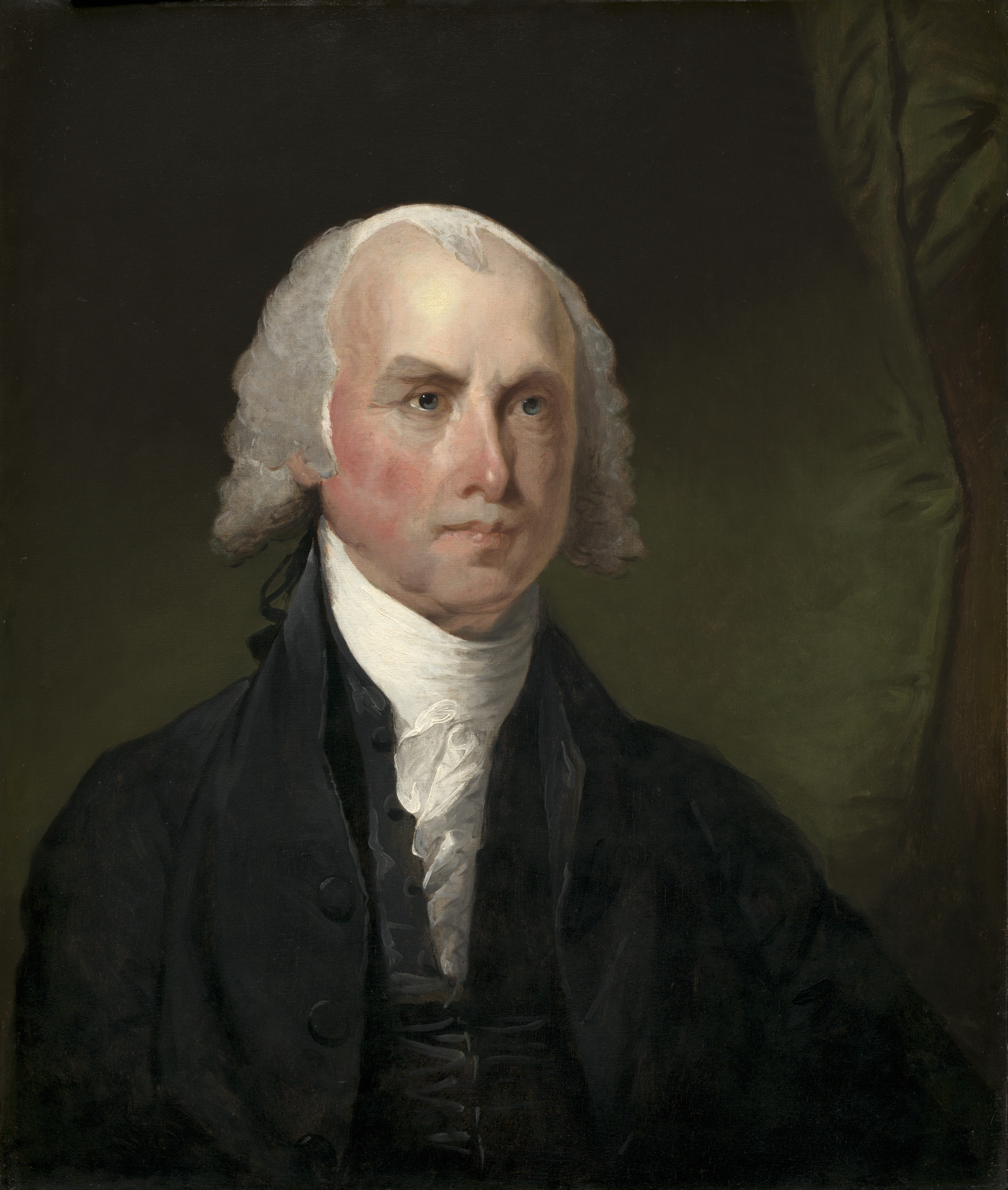
- James Madison, author of Federalist No. 41
- Author: James Madison
- Original title: General View of the Powers Conferred by the Constitution
- Language: English
- Series: The Federalist
- Publisher: New York Packet
- Publication date: January 19, 1788
- Publication place: United States
- Media type: Newspaper
- Preceded by: Federalist No. 40
- Followed by: Federalist No. 42

Federalist No. 41, titled "General View of the Powers Conferred by the Constitution", is an essay written by James Madison as the forty-first of The Federalist Papers. These essays were published by Alexander Hamilton, with John Jay and James Madison serving as co-authors, under the pseudonym "Publius." No. 41 was first published by The New York Packet on January 19, 1788 and argues about the necessity of the powers the Constitution vested upon the general government as well as the meaning of the phrase "general welfare".

== Background ==
On September 17, 1787, the Constitution was finalized and needed ratification from the states. Shortly after, Anti-Federalists began publishing papers arguing against the Constitution, motivating Alexander Hamilton, John Jay, and James Madison to respond with The Federalist Papers.

Many anti-federalists believed the government's revenue-raising power should not be restricted to only external taxes. In previous essays, Publius had already shown that, "extensive powers for the national government were necessary means of attaining a necessary end." However, critics continued to argue that these extensive powers were too broad, unnecessary, and easily abused.

Federalist No. 41 through No. 46 examine the powers given to the general government and address concerns about the divisions of powers raised in Federalist No. 37.

== Madison's arguments ==
=== Arguments against unnecessary powers ===
In Federalist 41, Madison repeats Hamilton's argument that the country was so situated that a large standing army, an institution always dangerous to popular liberties, would not be necessary, so that the nation would not be "crushed between standing armies and perpetual taxes... . The power of regulating and calling forth the militia has been already sufficiently vindicated and explained."

He begins the letter by addressing the two general points of view when considering how to assign power to the government: the first being the "...sum or quantity of power" that the Constitution has given to it, and the second being the government's structure and how the given powers are divided among its many branches. He focuses on the first question, and expands it by asking further questions:

- Are any parts of the powers given to the government "unnecessary or improper"?
- Are these powers, as a whole, dangerous or exploitable when given to the governing body?

Madison answers by stating: yes, these powers are unavoidably exploitable, however, they are a "necessary means to attaining a necessary end." The Constitution is further defended by stating that every form of government is imperfect and corruptible; the letter states that "a power to advance the public happiness involves a discretion which may be misapplied and abused." However, he also states that before giving a particular power to the government, lawmakers must first consider whether or not the power is necessary and they must guard against the possible perversion of that power and its eventual misuse against the public; this is why the Constitution involves many checks and balances to prevent such an event from happening.

=== Comparison to foreign nations ===
The letter reviews the six classifications of power given by the Constitution:

1. Security against foreign danger
2. Regulation of the intercourse with foreign nations
3. Maintenance of harmony and proper intercourse among the States
4. Certain miscellaneous objects of general utility
5. Restraint of the States from certain injurious acts
6. Provisions for giving due efficacy to all these powers.

This first classification of powers includes the ability to declare war, funding and maintaining armies and fleets, forming a militia, and borrowing money. Madison argues that all of these powers are necessary—not only for war, but also for self defense. Madison expands the argument with a comparison to 15th century European countries: Charles VII of France maintained a standing military during times of peace and if the rest of Europe had not followed, then the entire European continent would now be under the rule of one person.

A comparison between Europe and America is brought up in the letter where Madison states that a disjointed Europe is not as volatile when compared to a disunited America. He argues that America's problems would mostly be internal—between the States, as opposed to Europe's problems springing from rival nations around their borders. Madison then contrasts the American Constitution to Great Britain's Constitution, stating that the British government could potentially become so corrupted that the relatively small representative body, elected by a small percentage of the population, have the power to indefinitely maintain an army as opposed to the American Constitution's strict rule of a vote every two years.

== Modern analysis and reaction ==
In Anthony M. Bertelli's paper "Federalist No. 41: Does Polarization Inhibit Coordination?", he argues that all the limits the Constitution imposes on the government prevents the different branches from working together. He states that the Constitution does not incentivize coordination between government branches or political parties and that holds down the country. In their quest to prevent tyranny in their country, the founding fathers made it difficult for the government to work together for the good of the people.
