= Federalist No. 24 =

Federalist Paper by Alexander Hamilton regarding the common defense

- Alexander Hamilton, author of Federalist No. 24
- Author: Alexander Hamilton
- Original title: The Powers Necessary to the Common Defense Further Considered
- Language: English
- Series: The Federalist
- Publisher: The Independent Journal
- Publication date: December 19, 1787
- Publication place: United States
- Media type: Newspaper
- Preceded by: Federalist No. 23
- Followed by: Federalist No. 25
- Text: Federalist No. 24 at Wikisource

Federalist No. 24, titled "The Powers Necessary to the Common Defense Further Considered", is a political essay written by Alexander Hamilton and the twenty-fourth of The Federalist Papers. It was first published in New York newspapers on December 19, 1787, under the pseudonym Publius, the name under which all The Federalist Papers were published. It is one of two essays by Hamilton arguing in favor of a national standing army during peacetime, along with Federalist No. 25.

Federalist No. 24 challenged those who wish to prohibit a standing army in peacetime, arguing that its formation is essential for the security of the nation while concerns about its existence are exaggerated. Hamilton explained that provisions against the creation of a standing army did not exist in both the Articles of Confederation and most state constitutions, and he warned of potential threats that would necessitate a standing army. Federalist No. 24 was written at a time in which standing armies were viewed with skepticism, but such an army has come to be expected in the United States since Hamilton's time.

== Summary ==
Publius challenges the idea that the proposed constitution should prohibit standing armies in peacetime, calling it a mere assertion without strong justifications. Speculating about the perspective of someone who heard the cries for this position without reading the constitution, he supposes that such a person would assume the constitution mandated a standing army or that the executive branch of the government would control levying of soldiers. He explains that neither premise is true: no such provision would require a standing army and levying of soldiers is a power granted to the legislature.

Continuing with his hypothetical newcomer to the debate, Publius suggests that this person would be surprised to find that only two state constitutions had such a provision and that the Articles of Confederation had none. He describes the surprise and frustration that this person would feel to learn that apprehensions surrounding a standing army in peacetime, as Publius describes it, are unfounded.

Publius moves on to explain why a standing army during peacetime is necessary. He notes of the potential of conflict with Britain and Spain as well as Native American tribes, and he suggests that the United States could potentially be invaded by an enemy force on both land or sea. Publius describes already existing garrisons of soldiers who are stationed to prevent such attacks, and he explains that these garrisons can be run by professional soldiers or by militias. He expresses his preference for trained soldiers, saying that constantly raising militias would disturb the families of militiamen and interrupt men engaged in more industrious pursuits. Publius concludes with the argument that these ideas also apply to the eastern coast, where he says that a navy should be established, and that army garrisons should be established on parts of the coast where the navy is not large enough to defend.

== Background and publication ==
Federalist No. 24 was written by Alexander Hamilton. Following the Constitutional Convention in 1787, Hamilton worked with James Madison and John Jay to write a series of essays to explain the provisions of the Constitution of the United States and persuade New York to ratify it. They published these essays in New York newspapers under the shared pseudonym Publius. It was first published in the Independent Journal, the Daily Advertiser, and the New-York Journal on December 19, 1787. It was then published in the New-York Packet on December 21.

== Analysis ==
Federalist No. 24 challenged the refrain that the constitution was flawed because it did not prohibit a standing army during peacetime. During the 18th century, standing armies in peacetime were unpopular among proponents of civic republicanism, and they were often seen as a challenge to liberty, leading to a preference for militias to serve as soldiers only when necessary. Hamilton argued that a standing army was necessary and that such a prohibition would be harmful. He rejected the idea that a militia could perform as adequately as a standing army, and he also expressed concern that rotating militias would disrupt both industry and individual families. American military leaders such as George Washington agreed that a standing army was necessary instead of a militia.

Hamilton was skeptical that long-term peace was plausible. He noted that neither the Articles of Confederation nor most of the existing state constitutions had a prohibition on raising a standing army. He also emphasized that a safeguard was provided in that the legislature rather than the executive would control the army's funding. To demonstrate the need for a standing army, Hamilton pointed to the constant threats from adversaries that bordered the United States. He warned of Spanish colonies to the south, Native American tribes to the west, British colonies to the north, and the potential of naval attacks from the east. Hamilton further warned against complacence because European powers were far away, saying that advances in naval technology allowed distant nations to operate as if they were neighbors. For these reasons, advocated for the establishment of garrisons along the western frontier and eastern coast.

== Aftermath ==
Hamilton continued the same argument in Federalist No. 25. A standing army in peacetime has since become a widely accepted concept in the United States, including both active duty soldiers and military reserve forces. In peacetime, the latter often double as humanitarian workers during natural disasters. In addition to domestic and coastal defense garrisons as described by Hamilton, American soldiers also make up garrisons in other countries around the world, and the separation of nations by oceans has changed in the context of modern warfare.

Federalist No. 24 has been cited in cases before the Supreme Court of the United States: Lewis F. Powell Jr. cited it in Selective Service System v. Minnesota Public Interest Research Group (1984) and Wayte v. United States (1985), and Antonin Scalia cited it in Harmelin v. Michigan (1991).
