= The Independent Journal =

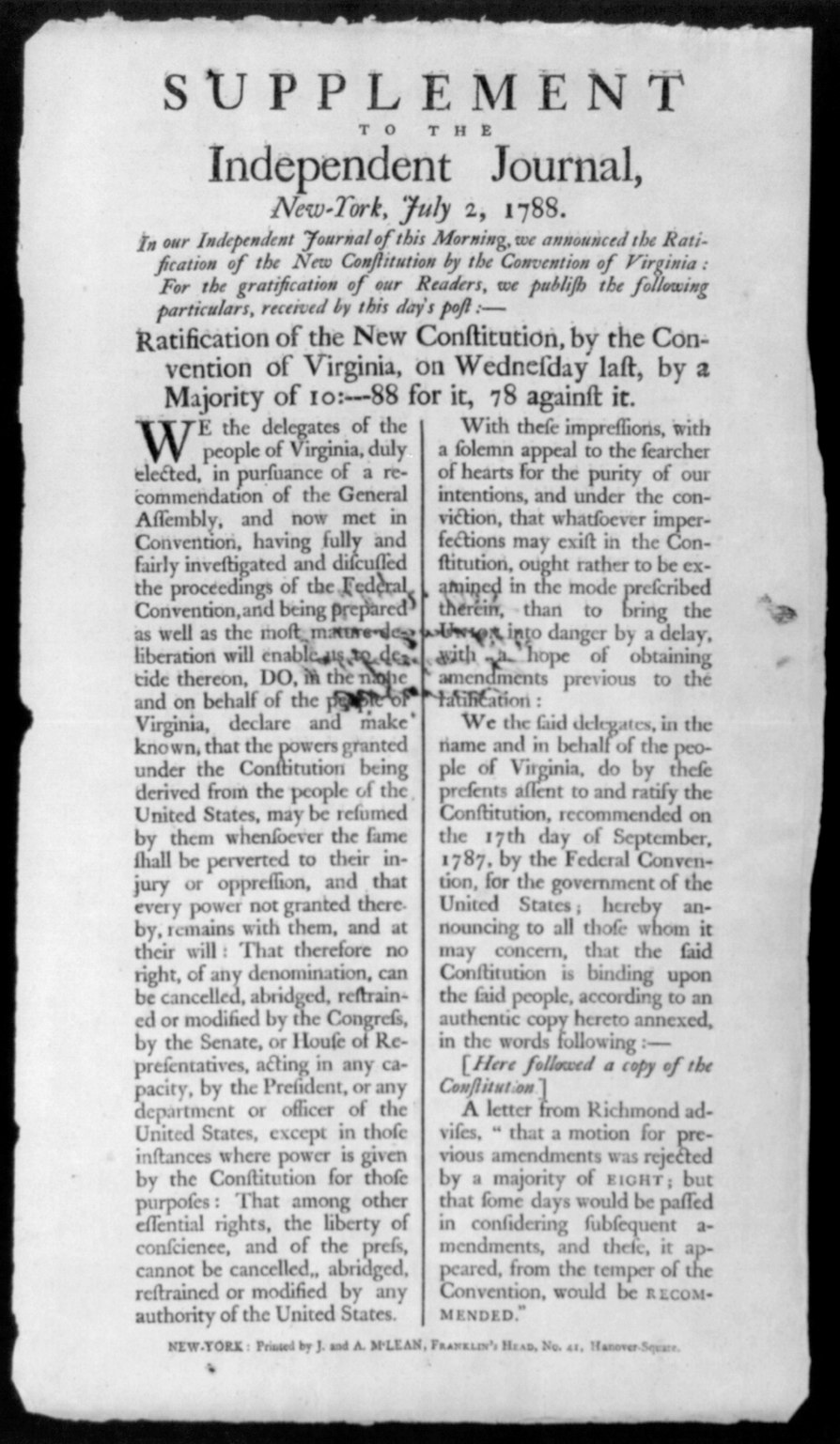
1788 supplement to the Independent Journal announcing the ratification of the Constitution of the United States by the state of Virginia

The Independent Journal was a semi-weekly New York City journal and newspaper edited and published by John McLean and Archibald McLean. The newspaper's content included contemporary essays and notices. The first issue was published on November 17, 1783, carrying the news of George Washington's resignation as commander-in-chief. After 1788, the newspaper operated under several other names, particularly the Daily Gazette and General Advertiser, before merging with The Journal of Commerce in 1840.

== The Federalist Papers ==
The Independent Journal is primarily remembered for being one of several newspapers to have initially published The Federalist papers – a series of eighty-five articles and essays discussing and advocating the ratification of the United States Constitution, written by John Jay, James Madison and Alexander Hamilton. It became the first newspaper to publish the material when it released the first Federalist essay on October 27, 1787. The release was accompanied by the following notice:

The Federalist, addressed to the People of the State of New York.

— The Independent Journal, October 27, 1787

Over the following month, the next seven essays were published by The Independent Journal and two other newspapers, The New York Packet and The Daily Advertiser. The essays appeared on Saturdays and Wednesdays in The Independent Journal, and a few days later in the other two. Following its publication of the seventh Federalist, The Independent Journal made an announcement:

In order that the whole subject of these Papers may be as soon as possible laid before the Public, it is proposed to publish them four times a week, on Tuesday in the New York Packet and on Thursday in the Daily Advertiser.

— The Independent Journal, November 27, 1787

In its announcement, the newspaper omitted to note its own publication dates, which continued to be on Wednesdays and Saturdays. However, the plan as outlined in The Independent Journal was not consistently followed; The Daily Advertiser stopped publishing in the agreed order after the release of the tenth essay. From November 30 onward, The New York Packet published on Tuesday and Friday, rather than only Tuesday.

By January 8, 1788, thirty-six Federalist essays had been published between the newspapers. John McLean bundled these thirty-six together and published them as The Federalist: A Collection of Essays, Written in Favour of the New Constitution, as Agreed upon by the Federal Convention, September 17, 1787, Volume I, on March 22, 1788. Publication of the essays resumed on 11 January, and essays thirty-seven to seventy-seven were published from that time through to April 2, 1788. Before the final eight could be published publicly in the newspapers, John McLean compiled and released Volume II of The Federalist essays, which consisted of essays thirty-seven through eighty-five, on May 28, 1788. The eight unpublished essays appeared in The Independent Journal and New York Packet between June 14 and August 16.
