= Partitions of Poland =

18th-century forced partitions of the Polish–Lithuanian Commonwealth

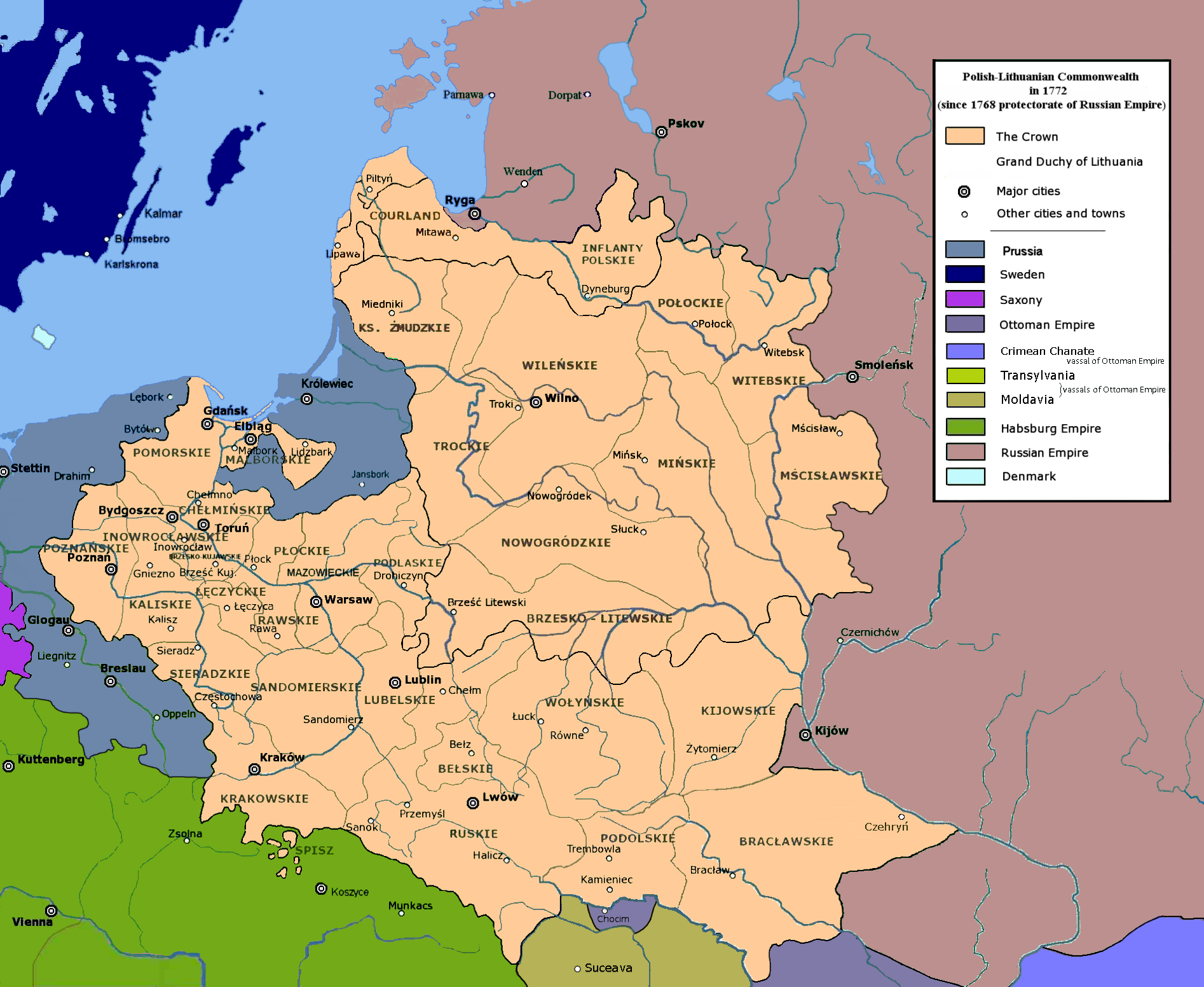
- The Polish–Lithuanian Commonwealth in 1772
- Partitions
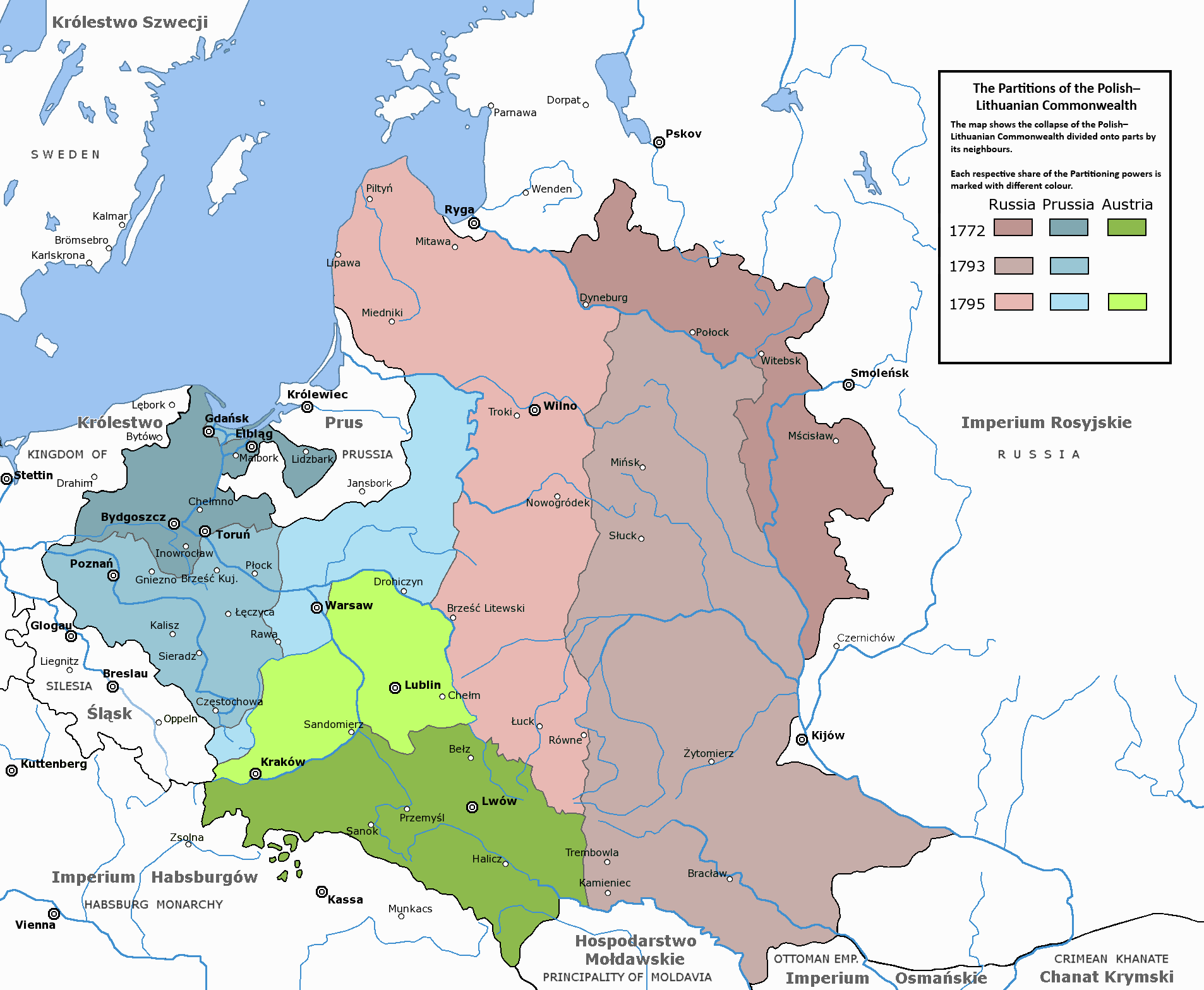
- The three partitions of Polish-Lithuanian Commonwealth: the Russian Partition (brown), the Austrian Partition (green), and the Prussian Partition (blue)

The Partitions of Poland (Note: Although the full name of the partitioned state was the Polish–Lithuanian Commonwealth, while referring to the partitions, virtually all sources use the term Partitions of Poland, not Partitions of the Polish–Lithuanian Commonwealth, as Poland is the common short name for the state in question. The term Partitions of the Polish–Lithuanian Commonwealth is effectively not used in literature on this subject.) were three partitions of the Polish–Lithuanian Commonwealth that took place between 1772 and 1795, toward the end of the 18th century. The partitions ended the existence of the state, resulting in the elimination of sovereign Poland and Lithuania for 123 years. The partitions were conducted by the Habsburg monarchy, the Kingdom of Prussia, and the Russian Empire, which divided up the commonwealth's lands among themselves progressively in the process of territorial seizures and annexations.

The First Partition was decided on 5 August 1772, after the Bar Confederation lost the war with Russia. The Second Partition occurred in the aftermath of the Polish–Russian War of 1792 and the Targowica Confederation, when Russian and Prussian troops entered the commonwealth and the partition treaty was signed during the Grodno Sejm on 23 January 1793 (without Austria). The Third Partition took place on 24 October 1795, in reaction to the unsuccessful Polish Kościuszko Uprising the previous year. With this partition, the commonwealth ceased to exist.

In English, the term "Partitions of Poland" is sometimes used geographically as toponymy, to mean the three parts that the partitioning powers divided the commonwealth into, namely: the Austrian Partition, the Prussian Partition and the Russian Partition. In Polish, there are two separate words for the two meanings. The consecutive acts of dividing and annexation of Poland are referred to as rozbiór (plural: rozbiory), while the term zabór (plural: zabory) refers to parts of the commonwealth that were annexed in 1772–1795 and which became part of Imperial Russia, Prussia, or Austria. Following the Congress of Vienna in 1815, the borders of the three partitioned sectors were redrawn; the Austrians established Galicia in the Austrian partition, whereas the Russians gained Warsaw from Prussia and formed an autonomous polity known as Congress Poland in the Russian partition.

In Polish historiography, the term "Fourth Partition of Poland" has also been used, in reference to any subsequent annexation of Polish lands by foreign invaders. Depending on source and historical period, this could mean the events of 1815, or 1832 and 1846, or 1939.

The term "Fourth Partition" in a temporal sense can also mean the diaspora communities that played an important political role in re-establishing the Polish sovereign state after 1918: after the end of World War I, the Central Powers' surrender to the Western Allies, the chaos of the Russian Revolution and the Treaty of Versailles finally allowed for the restoration of Poland's full independence after 123 years.

== History ==
Allegory of the first partition of Poland, showing Catherine the Great of Russia (left), Joseph II of Austria (middle) and Frederick the Great of Prussia (right) quarrelling over their territorial seizures

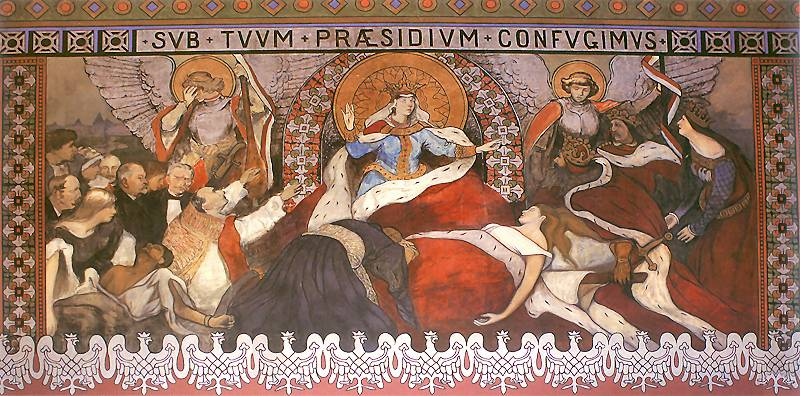
Włodzimierz Tetmajer, Allegory of Dead Poland, St. Nicholas Cathedral, Kalisz

During the reign of Władysław IV (1632–1648), the liberum veto was developed, a policy of parliamentary procedure based on the assumption of the political equality of every "gentleman/Polish nobleman", with the corollary that unanimous consent was needed for all measures. A single member of parliament's belief that a measure was injurious to his own constituency (usually simply his own estate), even after the act had been approved, became enough to strike the act. Thus, it became increasingly difficult to undertake action. The liberum veto also provided openings for foreign diplomats to get their way, through bribing nobles to exercise it. Thus, one could characterise Poland–Lithuania in its final period (mid-18th century) before the partitions as already in a state of disorder and not a completely sovereign state, and almost as a vassal state, with Polish kings effectively chosen in diplomatic maneuvers between the great powers Prussia, Austria, Russia and France. This applies particularly to the last Commonwealth King Stanisław August Poniatowski, who for some time had been a lover of Russian Empress Catherine the Great.

In 1730, the neighbors of the Polish–Lithuanian Commonwealth (Rzeczpospolita), namely Prussia, Austria and Russia, signed a secret agreement to maintain the status quo: specifically, to ensure that the commonwealth laws would not change. Their alliance later became known in Poland as the "Alliance of the Three Black Eagles" (or Löwenwolde's Treaty), because all three states used a black eagle as a state symbol (in contrast to the white eagle, a symbol of Poland). The commonwealth had been forced to rely on Russia for protection against the rising Kingdom of Prussia, which demanded a slice of the northwest in order to unite its Western and Eastern portions; this would leave the commonwealth with a Baltic coast only in Latvia and Lithuania. Catherine had to use diplomacy to win Austria to her side.

The commonwealth had remained neutral in the Seven Years' War (1756–1763), yet it sympathised with the alliance of France, Austria, and Russia, and allowed Russian troops access to its western lands as bases against Prussia. Frederick II retaliated by ordering enough Polish currency counterfeited to severely affect the Polish economy. Through the Polish nobles whom Russia controlled and the Russian Minister to Warsaw, ambassador and Prince Nicholas Repnin, Empress Catherine the Great forced a constitution on the commonwealth at the so-called Repnin Sejm of 1767, named after ambassador Repnin, who effectively dictated the terms of that Sejm (and ordered the capture and exile to Kaluga of some vocal opponents of his policies, including bishop Józef Andrzej Załuski and others). This new constitution undid the reforms made in 1764 under Stanisław II. The liberum veto and all the old abuses of the last one and a half centuries were guaranteed as unalterable parts of this new constitution (in the so-called Cardinal Laws). Repnin also demanded the Russian protection of the rights of peasants in private estates of Polish and Lithuanian noblemen, religious freedom for the Protestant and Orthodox Christians and the political freedoms for Protestants, Orthodox Christians and Eastern Catholics (Uniates), including their right to occupy all state positions, including a royal one. The next king could be a member of the Russian ruling dynasty now. The Sejm approved this. Resulting reaction among some of Poland's Roman Catholics, as well as the deep resentment of Russian intervention in the commonwealth's domestic affairs including the exile to Russia of the top Roman Catholic bishops, the members of the Polish Senate, led to the War of the Confederation of Bar of 1768–1772, formed in Bar, where the Poles tried to expel Russian forces from commonwealth's territory. The irregular and poorly commanded Polish forces had little chance in the face of the regular Russian army and suffered a major defeat. Adding to the chaos was a Ukrainian Cossack and peasant rebellion in the east (Koliyivshchyna), which erupted in 1768 and resulted in massacres of Polish noblemen (szlachta), Jews, Uniates, ethnic minorities and Catholic priests, before it was put down by Russian and governmental Polish troops. This uprising led to the intervention of the Ottoman Empire, supported by Roman Catholic France and Austria. The Bar Confederation and France promised Podolia and Volhynia and the protectorate over the commonwealth to the Ottoman Empire for armed support.

In 1769, the Habsburg monarchy annexed a small territory of Spisz and in 1770 it annexed Nowy Sącz and Nowy Targ. These territories had been a bone of contention between Poland and Hungary, which was a part of the monarchy. Nevertheless, the Ottoman Empire, the Bar confederation, bolstered by French volunteers, were defeated by Russian and Polish government forces. As Russia moved into the Crimea and the Danubian Principalities (which the Habsburg monarchy long coveted), Frederick II of Prussia and Maria Theresa were worried that the defeat of the Ottoman Empire would severely upset the balance of power in Eastern Europe. Frederick II began to construct the partition to rebalance the power in Eastern Europe.

=== First Partition ===
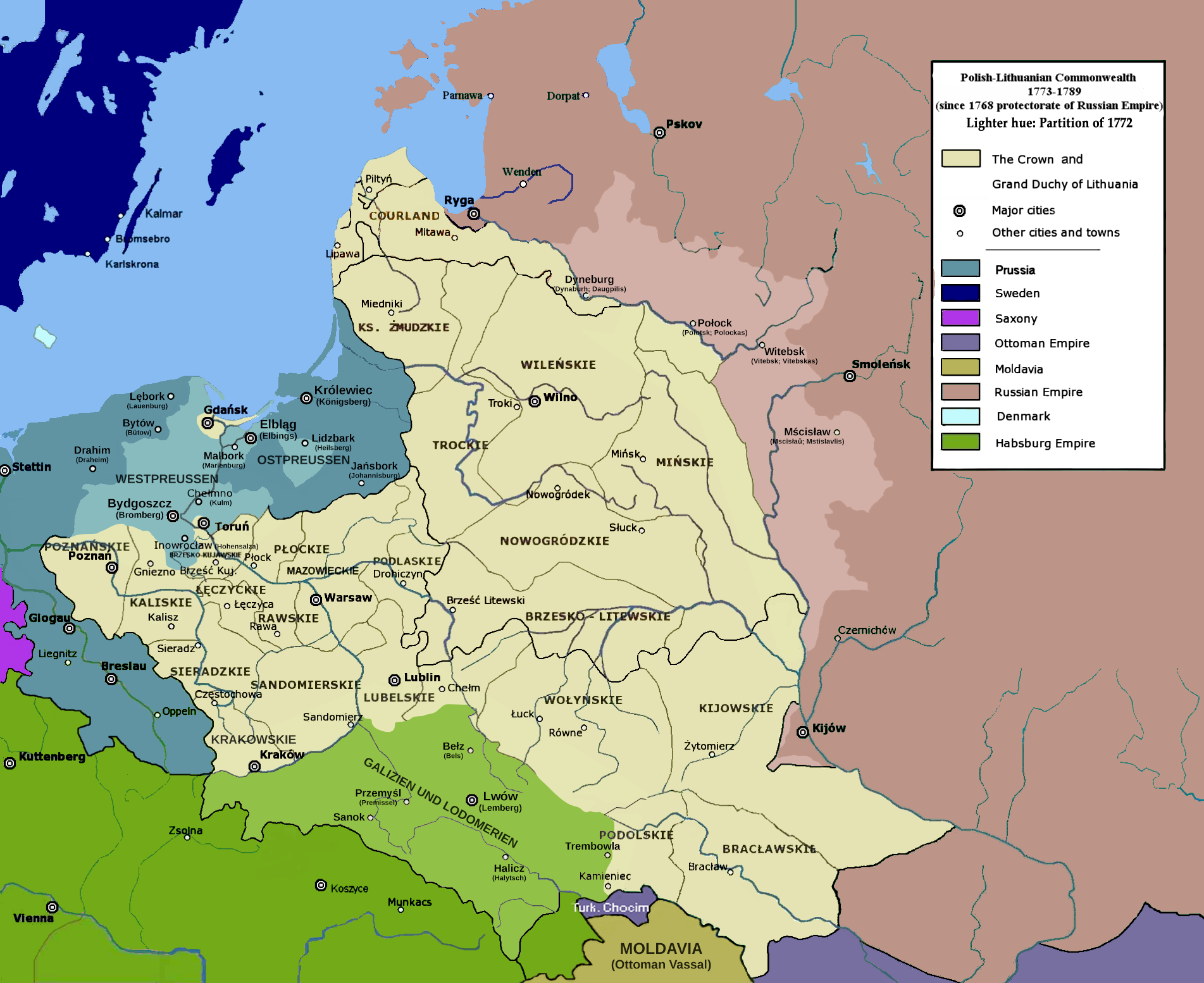
The Polish–Lithuanian Commonwealth after the First Partition, as a protectorate of the Russian Empire (1773–1789)

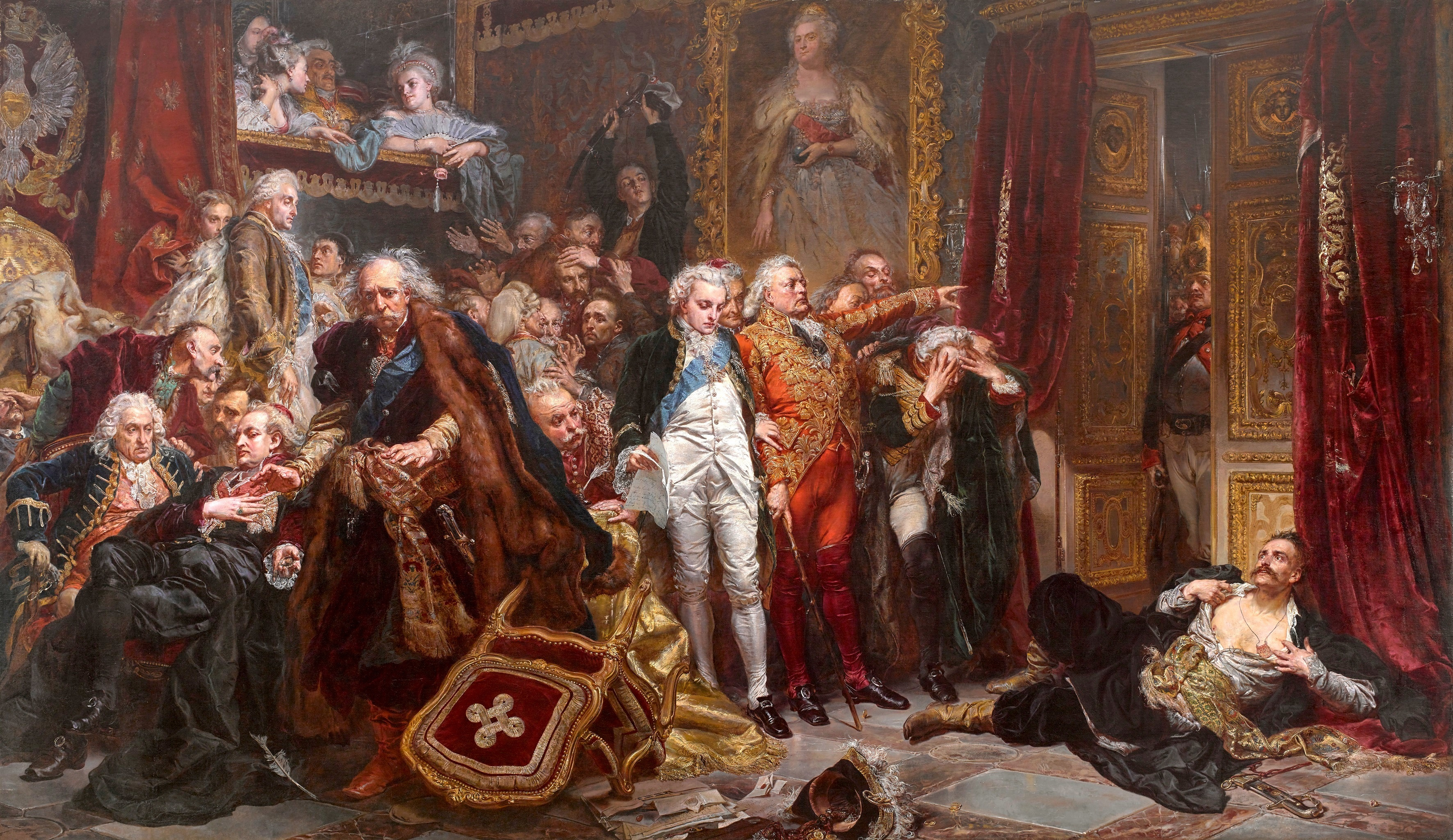
Rejtan at Sejm 1773, oil on canvas by Jan Matejko, 1866, 282 cm × 487 cm (111 in × 192 in), Royal Castle in Warsaw

In February 1772, the agreement of partition was signed in Vienna. Early in August, Russian, Prussian and Austrian troops occupied the provinces agreed upon among themselves. However, fighting continued as Bar confederation troops and French volunteers refused to lay down their arms (most notably, in Tyniec, Częstochowa and Kraków). On 5 August 1772, the occupation manifesto was issued, to the dismay of the weak and exhausted Polish state; the partition treaty was ratified by its signatories on 22 September 1772.

Frederick II of Prussia was elated with his success; Prussia took most of Royal Prussia (except Gdańsk) that stood between its possessions in Prussia and the Margraviate of Brandenburg, as well as Ermland (Warmia), northern areas of Greater Poland along the Noteć River (the Netze District), and parts of Kuyavia (but not the city of Toruń).

Despite token criticism of the partition from Empress Maria Theresa, Austrian statesman Wenzel Anton, Prince of Kaunitz-Rietberg, was proud of wresting as large a share as he did, with the rich salt mines of Bochnia and Wieliczka. To Austria fell Zator and Oświęcim, part of Lesser Poland embracing parts of the counties of Kraków and Sandomir and the whole of Galicia, less the city of Kraków.

Empress Catherine II of Russia was also satisfied despite the loss of Galicia to the Habsburg monarchy. By this "diplomatic document", Russia received Polish territory east of the line formed roughly by the Dvina and Dnieper rivers, including Polish Livonia (Latgale) and parts of the eastern Grand Duchy of Lithuania (in what is now Belarus), including the cities of Vitebsk, Polotsk, and Mstislavl.

By this partition, the Polish–Lithuanian Commonwealth lost about 30% of its territory and half of its population (four million people), of which a large portion had not been ethnically Polish. By seizing northwestern Poland, Prussia instantly gained control over 80% of the commonwealth's total foreign trade. Through levying enormous customs duties, Prussia accelerated the collapse of the commonwealth.

After having occupied their respective territories, the three partitioning powers demanded that King Stanisław and the Sejm approve their action. When no help was forthcoming and the armies of the combined nations occupied Warsaw to compel by force of arms the calling of the assembly, the only alternative was passive submission to their will. The so-called Partition Sejm, with Russian military forces threatening the opposition, on 18 September 1773, signed the treaty of cession, renouncing all claims of the commonwealth to the occupied territories.

In 1770-1771, Jean-Jacques Rousseau, at the request of Michał Wielhorski, a member of the Confederation of Bar, prepared a series of recommendations for reforming the political institutions of the Polish–Lithuanian Commonwealth. His Considerations on the Government of Poland were completed in 1771 and published posthumously in 1782. The text was his last major political work.

=== Second Partition ===
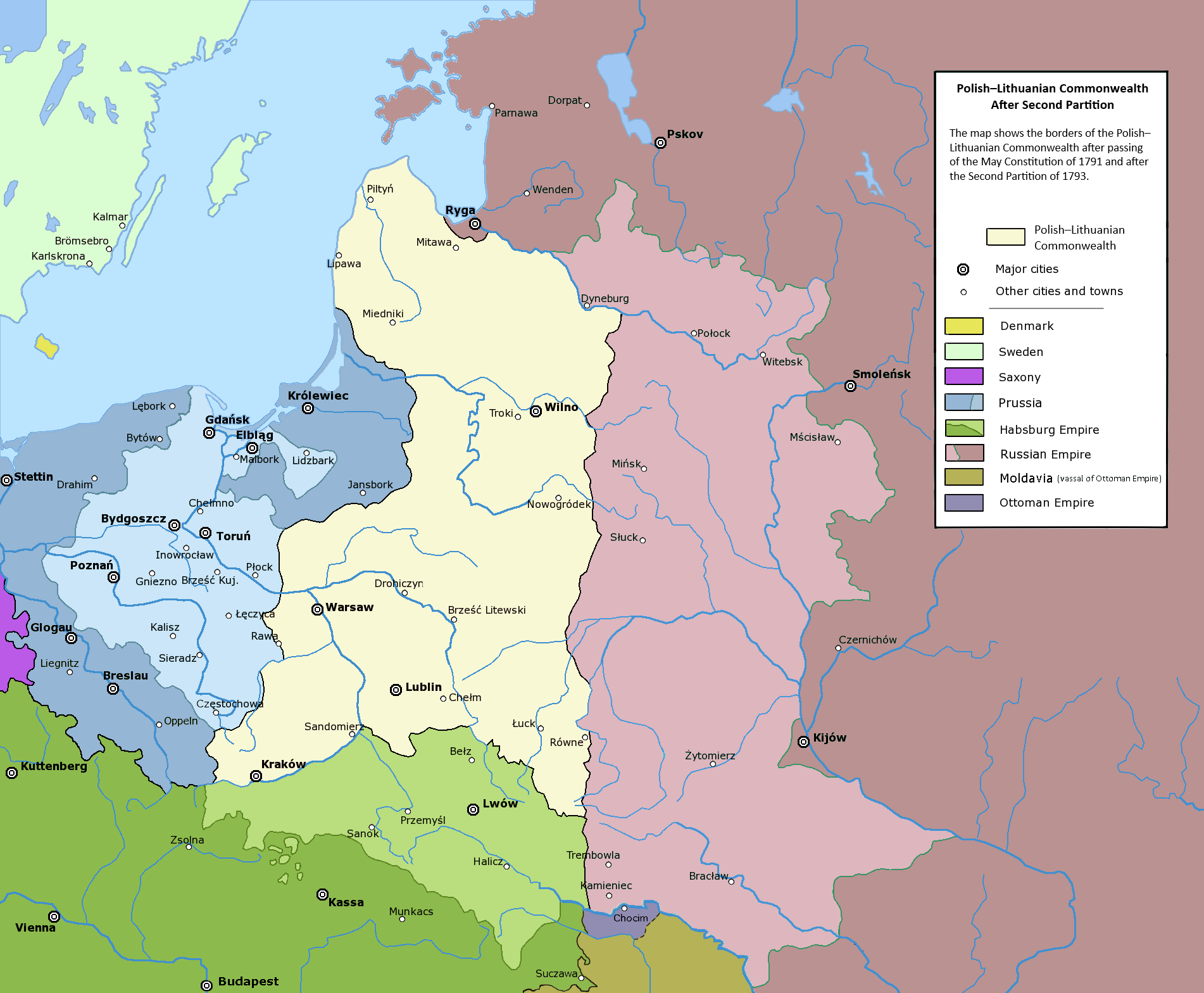
The Polish-Lithuanian Commonwealth after the Second Partition (1793)

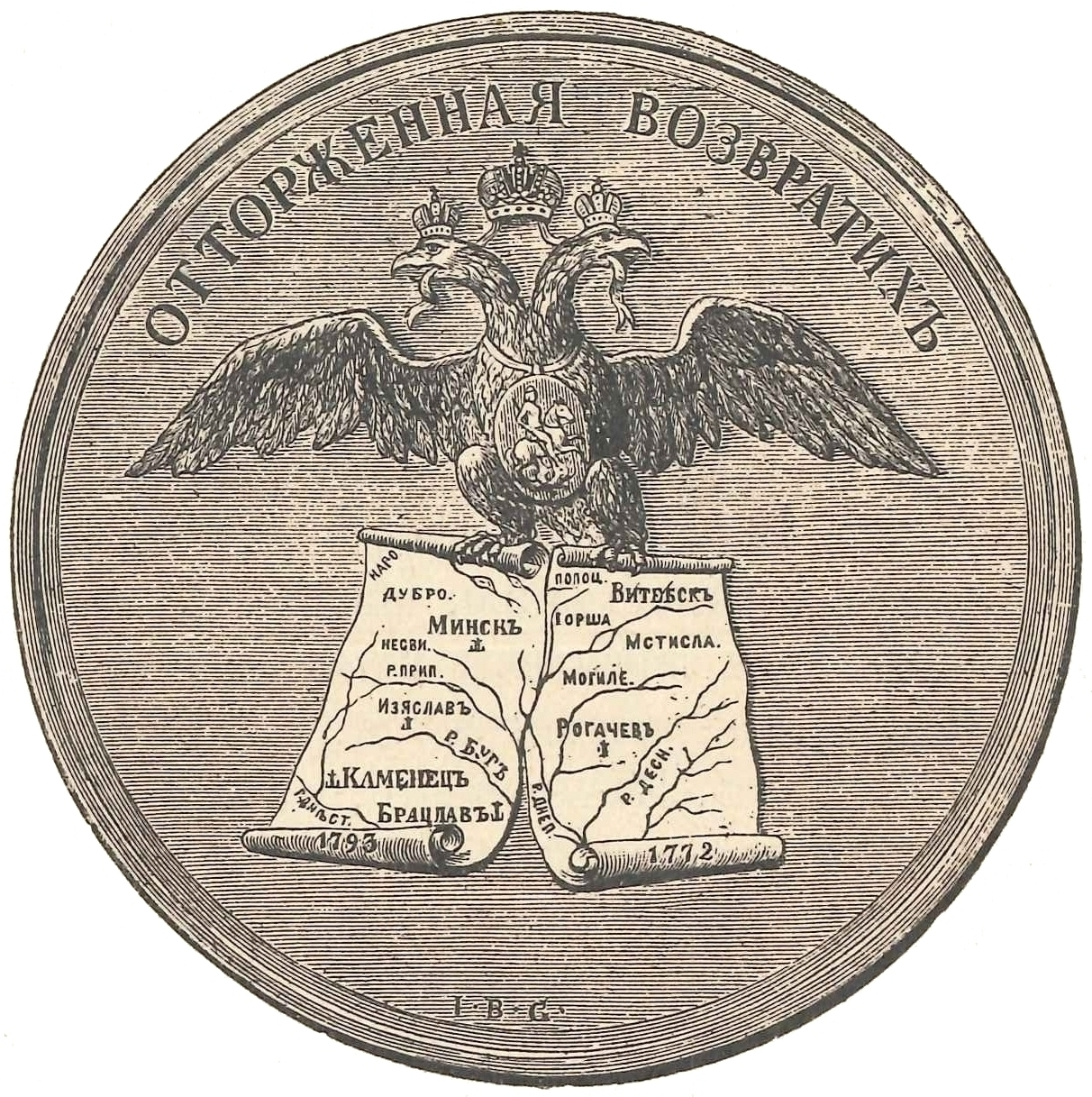
1793 Russian campaign medal

By 1790, the commonwealth had been weakened to such a degree that it was forced into an unnatural and terminal alliance with its enemy, Prussia. The Polish–Prussian Pact of 1790 was signed. The conditions of the Pact contributed to the subsequent final two partitions of Poland–Lithuania.

The Constitution of 3 May 1791 enfranchised the bourgeoisie, established the separation of the three branches of government, and eliminated the abuses of the Repnin Sejm. Those reforms prompted aggressive actions on the part of its neighbours, wary of the potential renaissance of the commonwealth. Arguing that Poland had fallen prey to the radical Jacobinism then at high tide in France, Russian forces invaded the commonwealth in 1792.

In the War in Defense of the Constitution, pro-Russian conservative Polish magnates, the Confederation of Targowica, fought against Polish forces supporting the constitution, believing that Russians would help them restore the Golden Liberty. Abandoned by their Prussian allies, Polish pro-constitution forces, faced with Targowica units and the regular Russian army, were defeated. Prussia signed a treaty with Russia, agreeing that Polish reforms would be revoked, and both countries would receive chunks of the commonwealth's territory. In 1793, deputies to the Grodno Sejm, the last Sejm of the Commonwealth, in the presence of the Russian forces, agreed to Russian territorial demands. In the Second Partition, Russia and Prussia helped themselves to enough land so that only one-third of the 1772 population remained in Poland. Prussia named its newly gained province South Prussia, with Poznań (and later Warsaw) as the capital of the new province.

Targowica confederates, who did not expect another partition, and the king, Stanisław August Poniatowski, who joined them near the end, both lost much prestige and support. The reformers, on the other hand, were attracting increasing support, and in 1794 the Kościuszko Uprising began.

=== Third Partition ===
Kosciuszko's ragtag insurgent armies won some initial successes, but they eventually fell before the superior forces of the Russian Empire. The partitioning powers, seeing the increasing unrest in the remaining commonwealth, decided to solve the problem by erasing any independent Polish state from the map. On 24 October 1795, their representatives signed a treaty, dividing the remaining territories of the commonwealth between their three countries. One of Russia's chief foreign policy authors, Alexander Bezborodko, advised Catherine II on the Second and Third Partitions of Poland.

The Russian part included 120,000 km^{2} (46,332 sq mi) and 1.2 million people with Vilnius, the Prussian part (new provinces of New East Prussia and New Silesia) 55,000 km^{2} (21,236 sq mi) and 1 million people with Warsaw, and the Austrian 47,000 km^{2} (18,147 sq mi) with 1.2 million and Lublin and Kraków.

== Aftermath ==
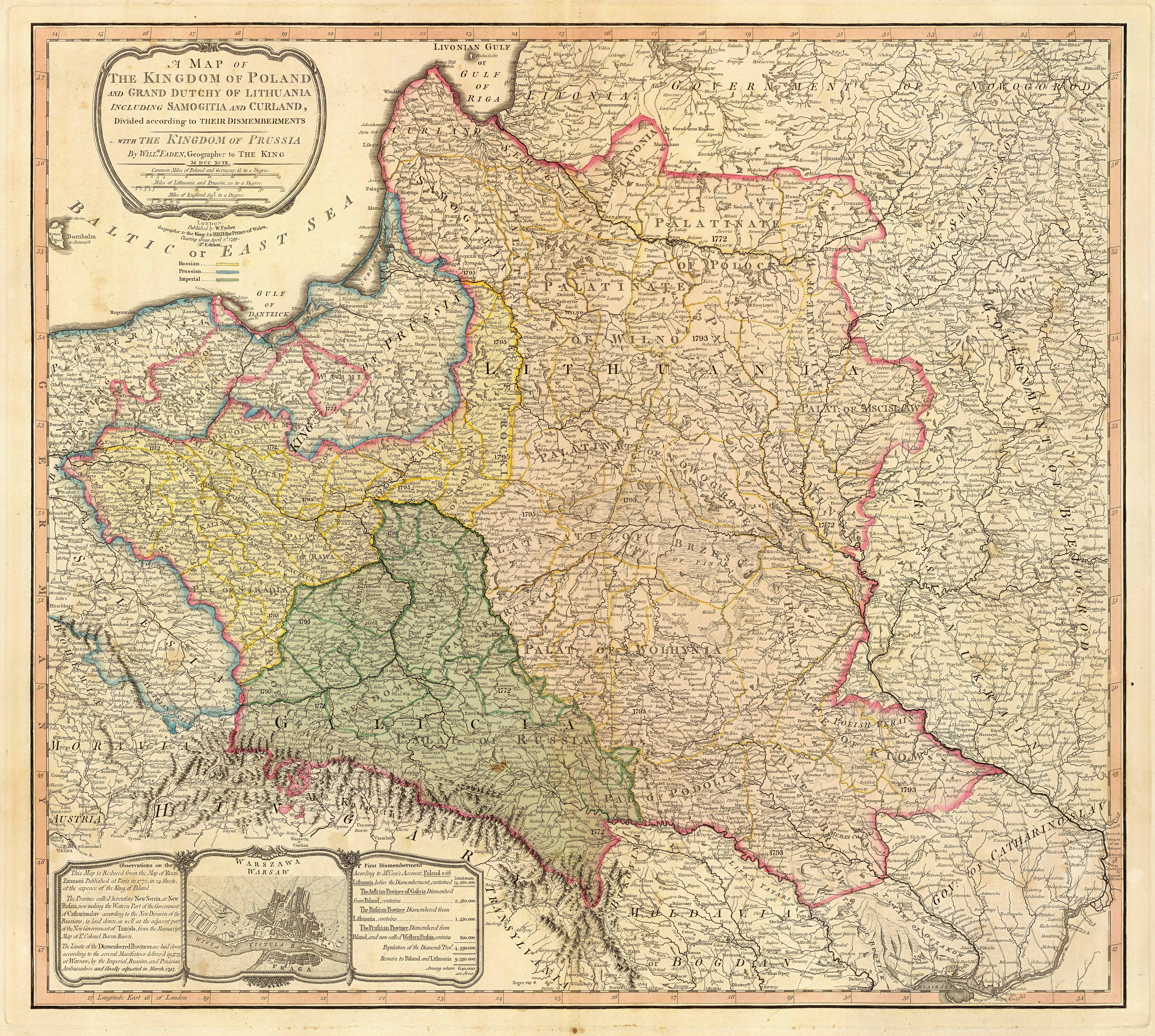
"A map of the Kingdom of Poland and the Grand Duchy of Lithuania including Samogitia and Curland divided according to their dismemberments with the Kingdom of Prussia" from 1799

The King of Poland, Stanisław August Poniatowski, under Russian military escort, left for Grodno where he abdicated on 25 November 1795; next he left for Saint Petersburg, Russia, where he would spend his remaining days. This act ensured that Russia would be seen as the most important of the partitioning powers.

With regard to population, in the First Partition, Poland lost over four to five million citizens (about a third of its population of 14 million before the partitions). Only about 4 million people remained in Poland after the Second Partition, which makes for a loss of another third of its original population, about a half of the remaining population. By the Third Partition, Prussia ended up with about 23% of the commonwealth's population, Austria with 32%, and Russia with 45%.

Cumulative division of the commonwealth territory. km^{2} (sq mi)
Partition	To Austria		To Prussia		To Russia		Total annexed		Total remaining	
Partition	Area	%	Area	%	Area	%	Area	%	Area	%
1772	81,900 (31,600)	11.17	36,300 (14,000)	4.95	93,000 (36,000)	12.68	211,200 (81,500)	28.79	522,300 (201,700)	71.21
1793	—	—	57,100 (22,000)	7.78	250,200 (96,600)	34.11	307,300 (118,600)	41.90	215,000 (83,000)	29.31
1795	47,000 (18,000)	6.41	48,000 (19,000)	6.54	120,000 (46,000)	16.36	215,000 (83,000)	29.31	None	0
Total	128,900 (49,800)	17.57	141,400 (54,600)	19.28	463,200 (178,800)	63.15	733,500 (283,200)	100		

(Wandycz also offers slightly different total annexed territory estimates, with 18% for Austria, 20% for Prussia and 62% for Russia.)

During the Napoleonic Wars and in their immediate aftermath, the borders between partitioning powers shifted several times, changing the numbers seen in the preceding table. Ultimately, Russia ended up with most of the Polish core at the expense of Prussia and Austria. Following the Congress of Vienna, Russia controlled 82% of the pre-1772 commonwealth's territory (this includes its puppet state of Congress Poland), Austria 11%, and Prussia 7%.

As a result of the Partitions, Poles were forced to seek a change of the status quo in Europe. Polish poets, politicians, noblemen, writers, artists, many of whom were forced to emigrate (thus the term Great Emigration), became the revolutionaries of the 19th century, as desire for freedom became one of the defining parts of Polish romanticism. Polish revolutionaries participated in uprisings in Prussia, the Austrian Empire and Imperial Russia. Polish legions fought alongside Napoleon and, under the slogan of For our freedom and yours, participated widely in the Spring of Nations (particularly the Hungarian Revolution of 1848).

Poland would be briefly resurrected — if in a smaller frame — in 1807, when Napoleon set up the Duchy of Warsaw. After his defeat and the implementation of the Congress of Vienna treaty in 1815, the Russian-dominated Congress Kingdom of Poland was created in its place. After the Congress, Russia gained a larger share of Poland (with Warsaw) and, after crushing an insurrection in 1831, the Congress Kingdom's autonomy was abolished and Poles faced confiscation of property, deportation, forced military service, and the closure of their own universities. After the uprising of 1863, Russification of Polish secondary schools was imposed and the literacy rate dropped dramatically. In the Austrian sector, which was now called Galicia, Poles fared better and were allowed to have representation in Parliament and to form their own universities, and Kraków with Lemberg (Lwów/Lviv) became centers of Polish culture and education. Meanwhile, Prussia Germanized the entire school system of its Polish subjects, and had no more respect for Polish culture and institutions than the Russian Empire. In 1915, a client state of the German Empire and Austria-Hungary was proposed and accepted by the Central Powers of World War I: the Regency Kingdom of Poland.

After the end of World War I, the Central Powers' surrender to the Western Allies, the chaos of the Russian Revolution and the Treaty of Versailles finally allowed for the restoration of Poland's full independence after 123 years.

== Reasons, legality and justifications ==
More recent studies claim that partitions happened when the commonwealth had been showing the beginning signs of a slow recovery and see the last two partitions as an answer to strengthening reforms in the commonwealth and the potential threat they represented to its power-hungry neighbours.

As historian Norman Davies stated, because the balance of power equilibrium was observed, many contemporary observers accepted explanations of the "enlightened apologists" of the partitioning state. 19th century historians from countries that carried out the partitions, such as 19th century Russian scholar Sergey Solovyov, and their 20th century followers, argued that partitions were justified, as the Polish–Lithuanian Commonwealth had degenerated to the point of being partitioned because the counterproductive principle of liberum veto made decision-making on divisive issues, such as a wide-scale social reform, virtually impossible. Solovyov specified the cultural, language and religious break between the supreme and lowest layers of the society in the eastern regions of the commonwealth, where the Belarusian and Ukrainian serf peasantry was Orthodox. Russian authors emphasized the historical connections between Belarus, Ukraine and Russia, as former parts of the medieval old Russian state where the dynasty of Rurikids reigned (Kievan Rus'). Thus, Nikolay Karamzin wrote: "Let the foreigners denounce the partition of Poland: we took what was ours." Russian historians often stressed that Russia annexed primarily Ukrainian and Belarusian provinces with Eastern Slavic inhabitants, although many Ruthenians were no more enthusiastic about Russia than about Poland, and ignoring ethnically Polish and Lithuanian territories also being annexed later. A new justification for partitions arose with the Russian Enlightenment, as Russian writers such as Gavrila Derzhavin, Denis Fonvizin, and Alexander Pushkin stressed the degeneration of Catholic Poland and the need to "civilize" it by its neighbors.

Nonetheless, other 19th century contemporaries were much more skeptical; for example, British jurist Sir Robert Phillimore discussed the partition as a violation of international law; German jurist Heinrich Bernhard Oppenheim presented similar views. Other older historians who challenged such justifications for the Partitions included French historian Jules Michelet, British historian and politician Thomas Babington Macaulay, and Edmund Burke, who criticized the immorality of the partitions. Nonetheless, most governments accepted the event as a fait acompli. The Ottoman Empire was either the only, or one of only two countries in the world that refused to accept the partitions, (the other being the Persian Empire), and reserved a place in its diplomatic corps for an Ambassador of Lehistan (Poland).

Several scholars focused on the economic motivations of the partitioning powers. Hajo Holborn noted that Prussia aimed to take control of the lucrative Baltic grain trade through Gdańsk. In the 18th century the Russian peasants were escaping from Russia to the Polish–Lithuanian Commonwealth (where the once dire conditions had improved, unlike in Russia) in significant enough numbers to become a major concern for the Russian Government sufficient to play a role in its decision to partition the commonwealth (one of the reasons Catherine II gave for the partition of Poland was that thousands of peasants escaped from Russia to Poland to seek a better fate"). Jerzy Czajewski and Piotr Kimla assert that in the 18th century until the partitions solved this problem, Russian armies increasingly raided territories of the commonwealth, officially to recover the escapees, but in fact kidnapping many locals; Piotr Kimla noted that the Russian government spread international propaganda, mainly in France, which falsely exaggerated serfdom conditions in Poland, while ignoring worse conditions in Russia, as one of the justification for the partitions.

== Legacy ==
Il Canto degli Italiani, the Italian national anthem, contains a Polish partition reference.

The ongoing partitions of Poland were a major topic of discourse in The Federalist Papers, where the structure of the government of Poland, and of foreign influence over it, is used in several papers (Federalist No. 14, Federalist No. 19, Federalist No. 22, Federalist No. 39 for examples) as a cautionary tale for the writers of the U.S. Constitution.

== Fourth Partition ==
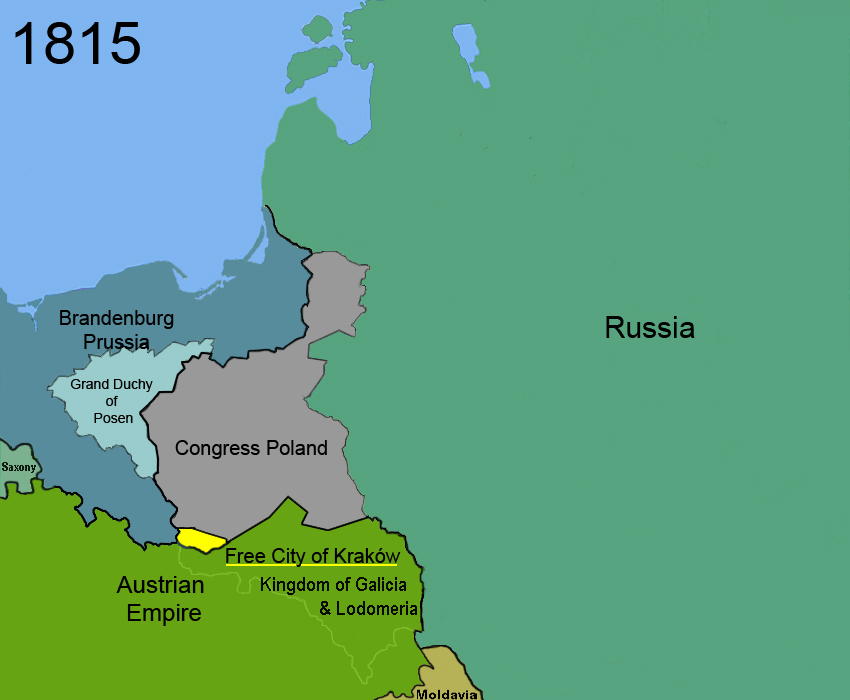
The partition of the Duchy of Warsaw according to the Congress of Vienna; division of Polish territories in 1815

The partition of Poland according to the German–Soviet Pact; division of Polish territories in 1939–1941

The term "Fourth Partition of Poland" may refer to any subsequent division of Polish lands, including:

- after the Napoleonic era, the 1815 division of the Duchy of Warsaw at the Congress of Vienna;
- the 1832 incorporation of the "Congress Kingdom" into Russia, the 1846 incorporation of the Republic of Kraków into Austria, and the 1848 incorporation of the Grand Duchy of Posen into Prussia; and
- the 1939 division of Poland between Germany and the Soviet Union (also by Slovakia) pursuant to the Molotov–Ribbentrop Pact.

If one accepts more than one of those events as partitions, fifth, sixth, and even seventh partitions can be counted, but these terms are very rare. (For example, Norman Davies in God's Playground refers to the 1807 creation of the Duchy of Warsaw as the fourth partition, the 1815 Treaty of Vienna as the fifth, the 1918 Treaty of Brest-Litovsk as the sixth, and the 1939 division of Poland between Nazi Germany and the USSR as the seventh.) However, in recent times, the 1815 division of the Duchy of Warsaw at the Congress of Vienna and the 1939 division of Poland have sometimes been called the fourth and fifth partitions, respectively.

The term "Fourth Partition" was also used in the 19th and 20th centuries to refer to diaspora communities who maintained a close interest in the project of regaining Polish independence. Sometimes termed Polonia, these expatriate communities often contributed funding and military support to the project of regaining the Polish nation-state. Diaspora politics were deeply affected by developments in and around the homeland, and vice versa, for many decades.

== See also ==
- Administrative division of Polish–Lithuanian territories after partitions
- Administrative division of the Polish–Lithuanian Commonwealth in the course of partitions
- Ambassadors and envoys from Russia to Poland (1763–1794)
- Three Emperors' Corner at the border of the Russian, Austrian and the German Empires
