= First Partition of Poland =

1772 division of Polish–Lithuania

The First Partition of Poland
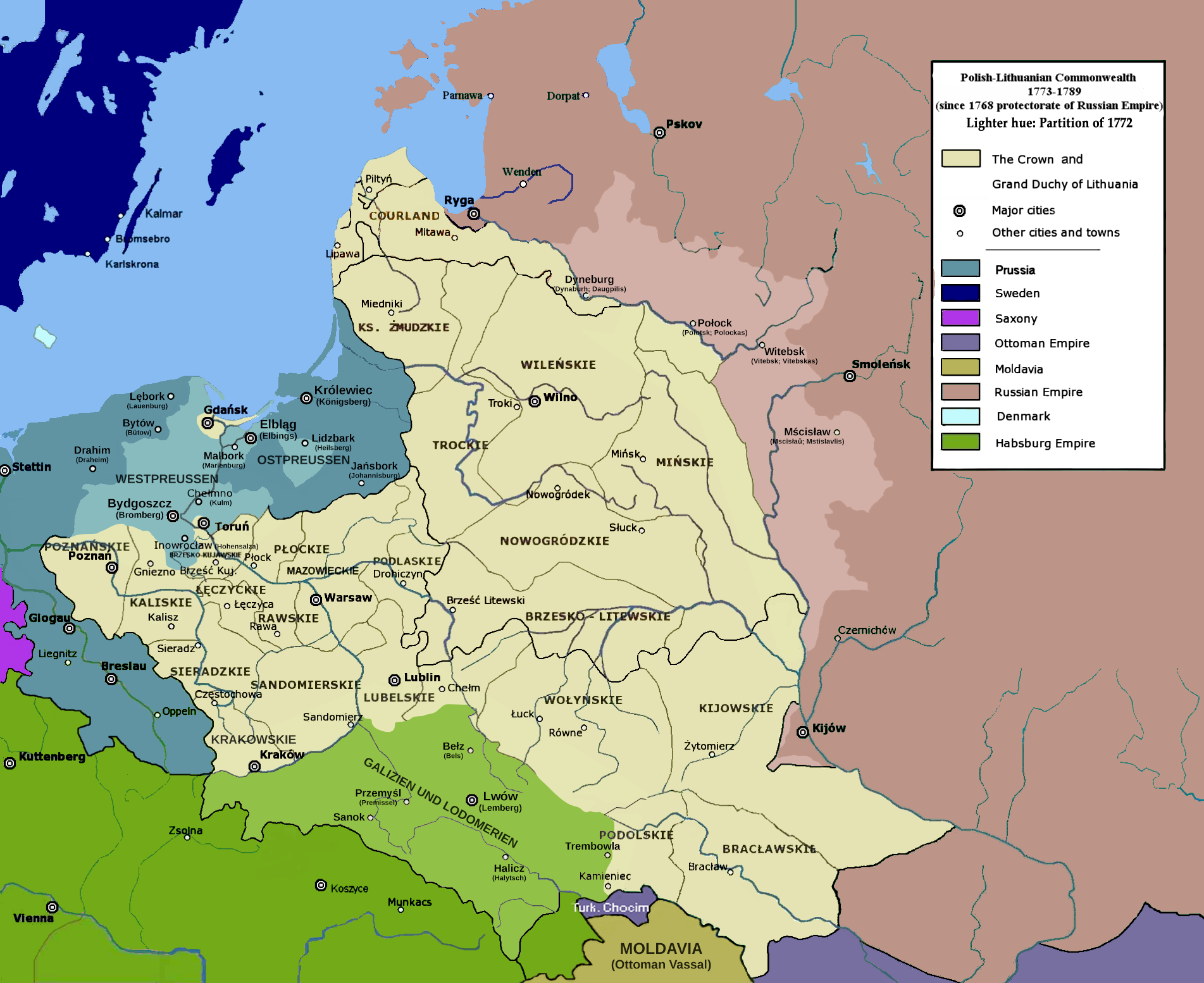
- The Polish–Lithuanian Commonwealth after the First Partition as a protectorate of the Russian Empire (1773–1789)

Population losses
- To Prussia: 580,000
- To Habsburg monarchy: 2,650,000
- To Russia: 1,300,000

Territorial losses
- To Prussia: 36,000 km^{2} (14,000 sq mi)
- To Habsburg monarchy: 83,000 km^{2} (32,000 sq mi)
- To Russia: 92,000 km^{2} (36,000 sq mi)

The First Partition of Poland took place in 1772 as the first of three partitions that eventually ended the existence of the Polish–Lithuanian Commonwealth by 1795. The growth of power in the Russian Empire threatened the Kingdom of Prussia and the Habsburg monarchy and was the primary motive behind the First Partition.

Frederick the Great, King in Prussia, engineered the partition to prevent Austria, which was envious of Russian successes against the Ottoman Empire, from going to war. Territories in Poland–Lithuania were divided by its more powerful neighbours (Austria, Russia and Prussia) to restore the regional balance of power in Central Europe among those three countries.

With Poland unable to defend itself effectively and foreign troops already inside the country, the Polish Sejm ratified the partition in 1773 during the Partition Sejm, which was convened by the three powers.

== Background ==
By the late 18th century, the Polish–Lithuanian Commonwealth had been reduced from the status of a European power to that of a country under major influence of, and almost becoming the protectorate (or vassal) of, the Russian Empire, with the Russian tsar effectively choosing Polish–Lithuanian monarchs during the free elections and deciding the outcome of much of Poland's internal politics. For example, the Repnin Sejm of 1767–68 was named after the Russian ambassador who had unofficially presided over its proceedings.

The First Partition occurred after the balance of power in Europe shifted, with Russian victories against the Ottomans in the Russo-Turkish War (1768–1774) strengthening Russia and endangering Habsburg interests in the region (particularly in Moldavia and Wallachia). Habsburg Austria then started considering waging war against Russia.

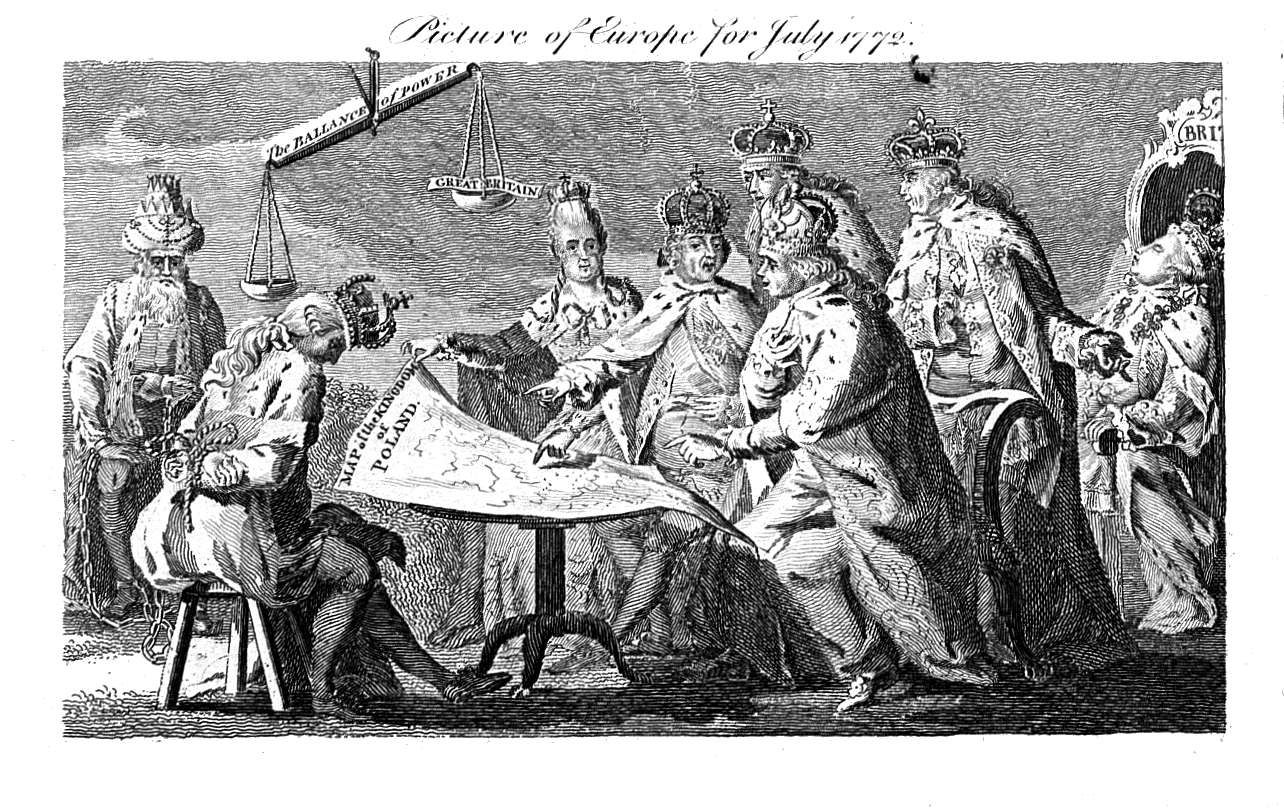
Picture of Europe for July 1772, satirical British plate

France was friendly towards the Ottoman Empire but also both Prussia and Austria and suggested a series of territorial adjustments in which the Ottoman Empire would not suffer from Austria and Russia. In return, Austria would be compensated with parts of Prussian Silesia, and Prussia would regain Ermland (Warmia) from the part of Prussia which Poland had annexed in the Second Treaty of Thorn, plus the Duchy of Courland and Semigallia, already under Baltic German hegemony.

King Frederick II of Prussia had no intention of giving up Silesia, having recently gained it in the Silesian Wars, but was also interested in finding a peaceful solution. The Russo-Prussian alliance would draw him into a potential war against Austria, and the Seven Years' War had left Prussia's treasury and army weakened. Like France, he was interested in protecting the weakening Ottoman Empire, which could be advantageously used in the event of a Prussian war either against Russia or Austria.

Frederick's brother, Prince Henry, spent the winter of 1770–71 as a representative of the Prussian court at Saint Petersburg. As Austria had annexed the 13 Polish-held towns in the Hungarian Szepes region in 1769 in violation of the Treaty of Lubowla, Catherine II of Russia and her advisor General Ivan Chernyshyov suggested to Henry that Prussia claim some land currently held by Poland, such as Ermland. After Henry had informed him of the proposal, Frederick suggested a partition of the Polish borderlands by Austria, Prussia and Russia, with the largest share going to Austria, the party most weakened by the recent changes in the balance of power.

Thus, Frederick attempted to encourage Russia to direct its expansion towards a weak and dysfunctional Poland instead of the Ottomans. The Austrian statesman Wenzel Anton Graf Kaunitz made a counter-proposal for Prussia to take lands held by Poland in return for relinquishing Glatz and parts of Silesia to Austria, but his plan was rejected by Frederick.

Although for a few decades, since Poland's Silent Sejm, Russia had seen the weak Poland as its own protectorate, Poland had also been devastated by a civil war in which the forces of the Bar Confederation, formed in Bar, attempted to disrupt Russian control over Poland. The recent Koliyivschyna peasant and Cossack uprising in Ukraine also weakened the Polish position. Besides, the Russian-supported Polish king, Stanisław August Poniatowski, was seen as both weak and too independent-minded. Eventually, the Russian court decided that the usefulness of Poland as a protectorate had diminished.

The three powers officially justified their actions as compensation for dealing with a troublesome neighbour and restoring order to Polish anarchy, and the Bar Confederation provided a convenient excuse although all three were interested in territorial gains.

After Russia had occupied the Danubian Principalities, Henry convinced Frederick and Empress Maria Theresa that the balance of power would be maintained by a tripartite division of the so-called Polish-Lithuanian Commonwealth instead of Russia taking land from the Ottomans. Under pressure from Prussia, which had long wanted to recover the northern province of so-called Royal Prussia, the three powers agreed on the First Partition of Poland.

That was in light of the possible Austrian-Ottoman alliance with only token objections from Austria although it would have preferred to receive more Ottoman territories in the Balkans, a region that had long been coveted by the Habsburgs. The Russians also withdrew from Moldavia, away from the Austrian border.

An attempt of the Bar Confederacy to kidnap King Stanisław on 3 November 1771 gave the three courts another pretext to showcase the "Polish anarchy" and the need for its neighbours to step in and "save" the country and its citizens.

== Partition begins ==
Already by 1769–1771, both Austria and Prussia had taken over some border territories of the Commonwealth, with Austria taking the Eldership of Spisz, Czorsztyn, Stary Sącz and Nowy Targ in 1769–1770 and Prussia incorporating Lauenburg and Bütow. On February 19, 1772, the agreement of partition was signed in Vienna. A previous agreement between Prussia and Russia had been made in Saint Petersburg on February 6, 1772.

In early August, Russian, Prussian and Austrian troops simultaneously entered the Commonwealth and occupied the provinces that had been agreed upon among themselves. On August 5, the three parties signed the treaty on their respective territorial gains.

The regiments of the Bar Confederation, whose executive board had been forced to leave Austria, which had supported them, after Austria joined the Prusso–Russian alliance, did not lay down their arms. Many fortresses in their command held out as long as possible. Wawel Castle in Kraków fell only at the end of April; Tyniec Fortress held until the end of July 1772; Częstochowa, commanded by Casimir Pulaski, held until late August. In the end, the Bar Confederation was defeated, with its members either fleeing abroad or being deported to Siberia by the Russians.

== Division of territories ==
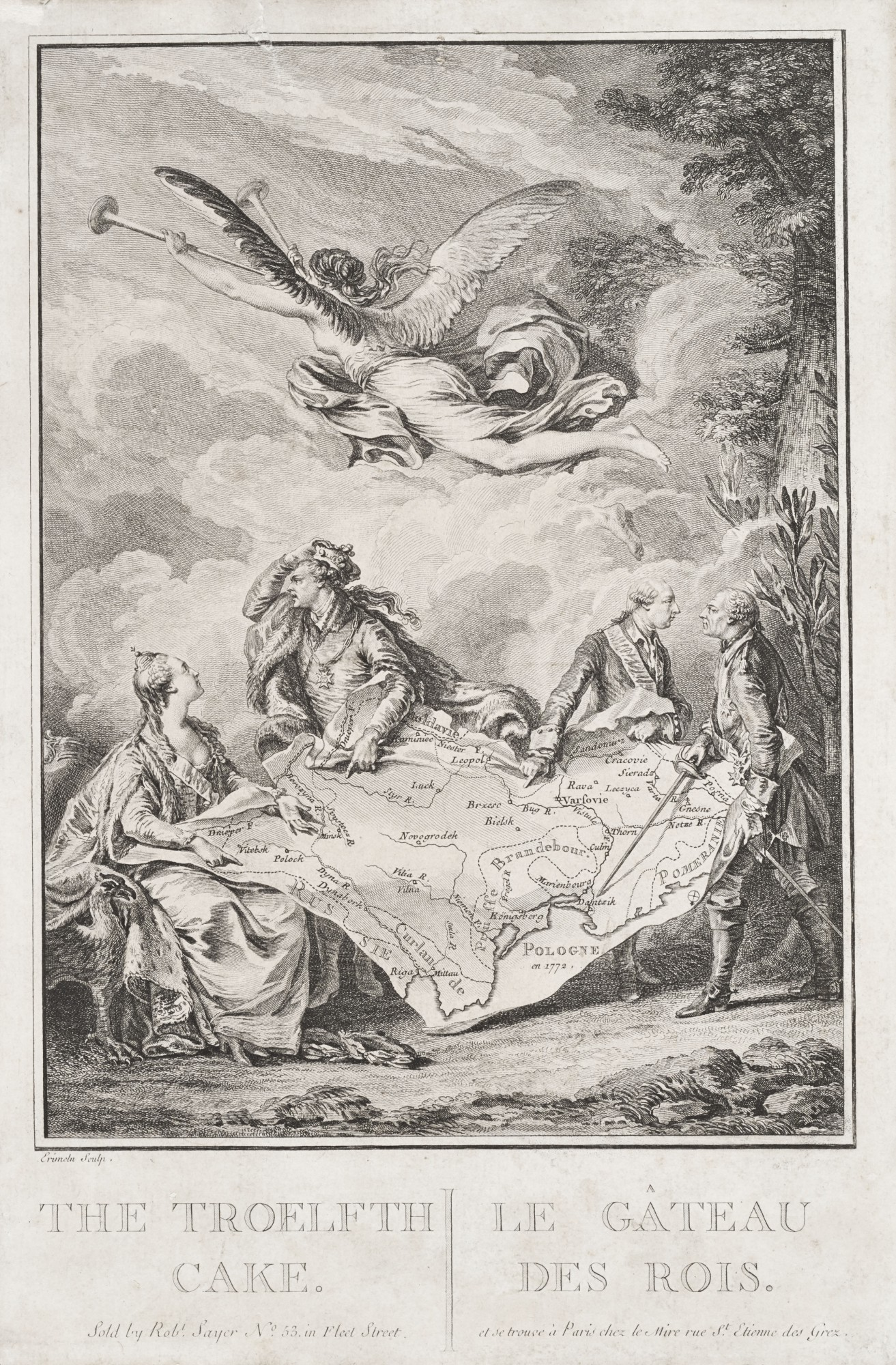
The Troelfth Cake, a 1773 French allegory by Jean-Michel Moreau le Jeune for the First Partition of Poland^{[a]}

The partition treaty was ratified by its signatories on September 22, 1772. It was a major success for Frederick II of Prussia: Prussia's share might have been the smallest, but it was also significantly developed and strategically important. Prussia took most of Polish Royal Prussia, including Ermland, which allowed Frederick to link East Prussia and Brandenburg. Prussia also annexed northern areas of Greater Poland along the Noteć River (the Netze District), and northern Kuyavia, but not the cities of Danzig (Gdańsk) and Thorn (Toruń). In 1773, the territories annexed by Prussia became the new province of West Prussia. Overall, Prussia gained 36,000 square kilometres (14,000 sq mi) and about 600,000 people. According to Jerzy Surdykowski, Frederick the Great soon introduced German colonists in territories he conquered, and enforced the Germanization of Polish territories. Frederick II settled 26,000 Germans in Polish Pomerania, who influenced the ethnic situation in the region, which had around 300,000 inhabitants. According to Christopher Clark, in certain areas annexed by Prussia like Notec and Royal Prussia, 54% of the population (75% in the urban areas) were German-speaking Protestants. That condition in the next century would be used by nationalistic German historians to justify the partition, but it was irrelevant to contemporary calculations. Frederick was dismissive of German culture; he pursued an imperialist policy, acting on the security interests of his state with dynastic rather than national identity.

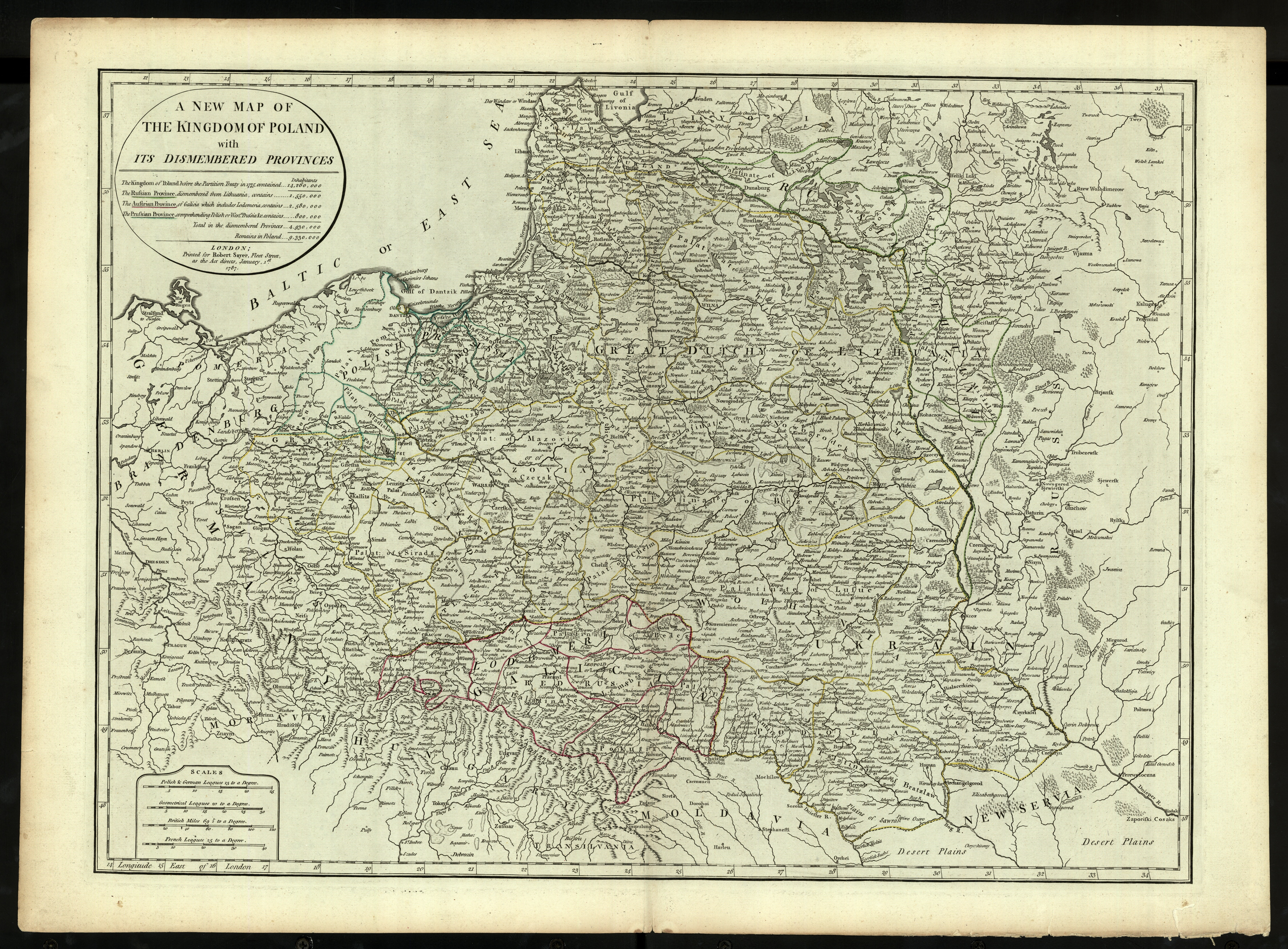
A new map of the Kingdom of Poland after 1st partition by Robert Sayer in 1787. The annexed territories were called Polish Prussia (at the north), Russian Lithuania (at the east) and Galicia & Lodomeria (at the south)

The newly gained territories connected East Prussia with Germany proper and had major economic importance. By seizing northwestern Poland, Prussia instantly cut off Poland from the sea and gained control of over 80% of the Commonwealth's total foreign trade. Through levying enormous customs duties, Prussia accelerated the inevitable collapse of the Commonwealth. The acquisition of Polish Royal Prussia also permitted Frederick to change his title from King in Prussia to King of Prussia.

Despite token criticism of the partition from the Empress Maria Theresa, the Austrian statesman Wenzel Anton Graf Kaunitz considered the Austrian share an ample compensation. Although Austria was the least interested in the partition, it received the largest share of the former Polish population and the second-largest land share: 83,000 square kilometres (32,000 sq mi) and 2,650,000 people. Austria gained Zator, Auschwitz, part of Little Poland (which constituted the counties of Kraków and Sandomierz), including the rich salt mines of Bochnia and Wieliczka but not the city of Kraków itself, and the whole of Galicia.

The Russian share, on the northeast, was the largest, but the least-important area economically. By the "diplomatic document", Russia came into possession of the commonwealth territories east of the line formed roughly by the Dvina, Drut, and Dnieper rivers, the section of Livonia that had remained in Commonwealth control after the 1629 Truce of Altmark (i.e. Inflanty Voivodeship, excluding the former western exclaves around Piltene/Piltyń, which had been transferred to Courland in 1717), and of Belarus embracing the counties of Vitebsk, Polotsk and Mstislavl. Russia gained 92,000 square kilometres (36,000 sq mi) and 1,300,000 people, and reorganized its newly acquired lands into Pskov Governorate, which also included two provinces of Novgorod Governorate, and Mogilev Governorate. Zakhar Chernyshyov was appointed the Governor General of the new territories on May 28, 1772.

By the first partition, the Commonwealth lost about 211,000 square kilometres (81,000 sq mi) (30% of its territory, amounting to about 733,000 square kilometres (283,000 sq mi)), with a population of over four to five million people, about a third of its population of fourteen million before the partitions.

== Aftermath ==
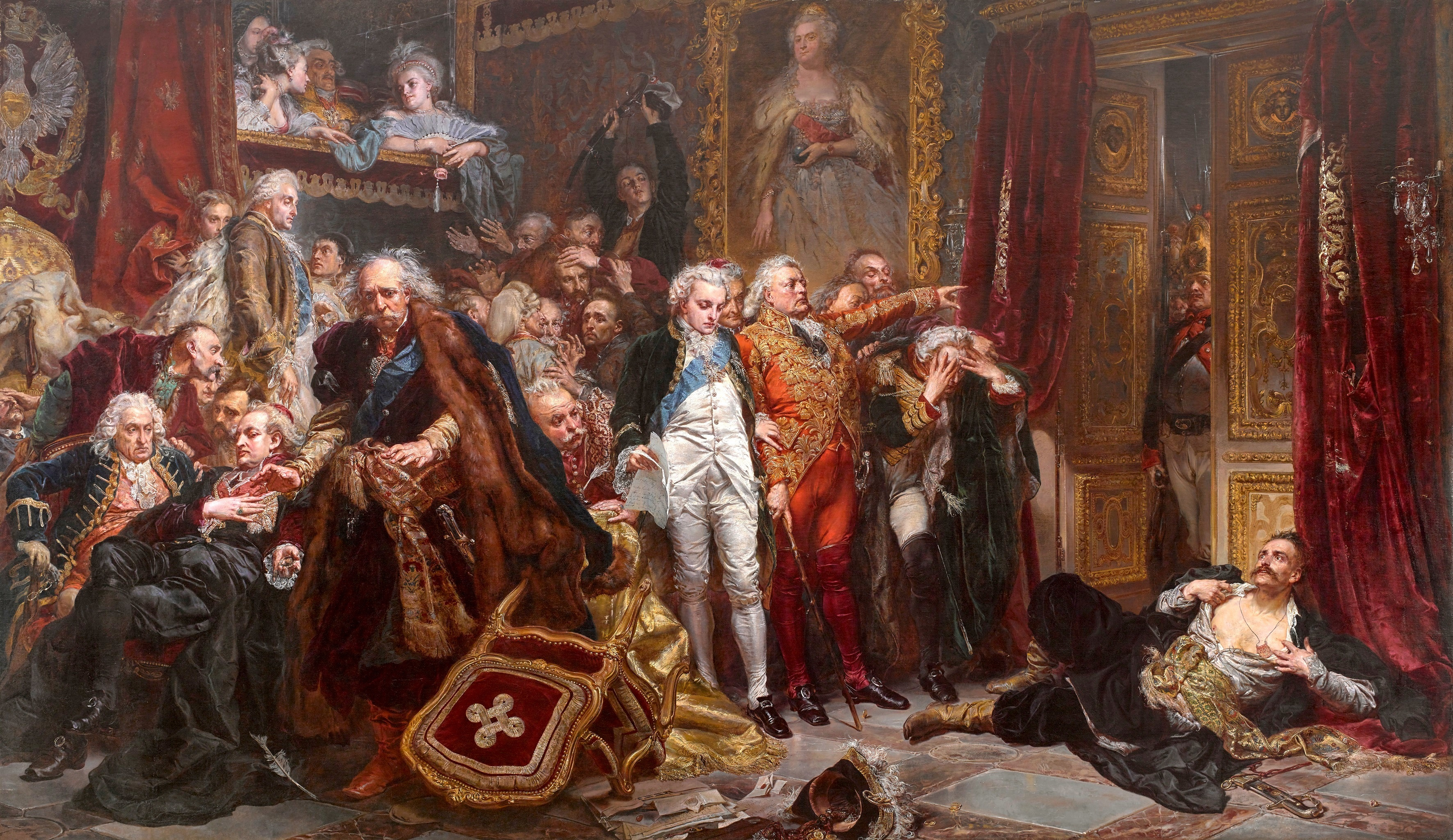
Rejtan – The Fall of Poland, oil on canvas by Jan Matejko, 1866, 282 cm × 487 cm (111 in × 192 in), Royal Castle in Warsaw

After they had occupied their respective territories, the three partitioning powers demanded that King Stanisław August Poniatowski and the Sejm approve their action. The king appealed to the nations of Western Europe for help and tarried with the convocation of the Sejm. The European powers reacted to the partition with utmost indifference; only a few voices like Edmund Burke were raised in objection.

When no help was forthcoming and the armies of the combined nations occupied Warsaw, the capital, to compel by force of arms the calling of the assembly, no alternative could be chosen but passive submission to their will. The senators who advised against that step were threatened by the Russians, represented by the ambassador, Otto von Stackelberg, who declared that in the face of refusal, the whole of Warsaw would be destroyed by them. Other threats included execution, confiscation of estates, and further increases of partitioned territory. According to Edward Henry Lewinski Corwin, some senators were even arrested by the Russians and exiled to Siberia.

The local land assemblies (Sejmiks) refused to elect deputies to the Sejm, and after great difficulties, less than half of the regular number of representatives came to attend the session led by Marshals of the Sejm, Michał Hieronim Radziwiłł and Adam Poniński. The latter in particular was one of many Polish nobles who were bribed by the Russians into following their orders. The Sejm became known as the Partition Sejm. To prevent the disruption of the Sejm via liberum veto and the defeat of the purpose of the invaders, Poniński undertook to turn the regular Sejm into a confederated sejm in which majority rule prevailed.

In spite of the efforts of individuals like Tadeusz Rejtan, Samuel Korsak, and Stanisław Bohuszewicz to prevent it, the deed was accomplished with the aid of Poniński, Radziwiłł, and the bishops Andrzej Młodziejowski, Ignacy Jakub Massalski, and Antoni Kazimierz Ostrowski (primate of Poland), who occupied high positions in the Senate of Poland. The Sejm elected a committee of thirty to deal with the various matters presented. On September 18, 1773, the committee signed the treaty of cession, renouncing all Commonwealth claims to the lost territories.

== Other countries ==
The only two countries that refused to accept the partitions were the Ottoman and Persian Empires.

Il Canto degli Italiani, the Italian national anthem, contains a reference to the partition.

The ongoing partitions of Poland were a major topic of discourse in the Federalist Papers in which the structure of the government of Poland and the foreign influence over it were used in several papers (Federalist No. 14, Federalist No. 19, Federalist No. 22, Federalist No. 39 for examples) as a cautionary tale for the writers of the US Constitution.

In 1772, Jean-Jacques Rousseau was invited to present recommendations for a new constitution for the Polish–Lithuanian Commonwealth, resulting in the Considerations on the Government of Poland (1782), which was to be his last major political work.

== See also ==
- Administrative division of the Polish–Lithuanian Commonwealth in the course of partitions
- Administrative division of Polish territories after partitions
- Second Partition of Poland

== Notes ==
a The picture shows the rulers of the three countries that participated in the partition tearing a map of Poland apart. The outer figures demanding their share are Catherine II of Russia and Frederick II of Prussia. The inner figure on the right is the Habsburg Emperor Joseph II, who appears ashamed of his action (although in reality, he was more of an advocate of the partition, and it was his mother, Maria Theresa, who was critical of the partition). On his right is the beleaguered Polish king, Stanisław August Poniatowski, who is experiencing difficulty keeping his crown on his head. Above the scene the angel of peace trumpets the news that civilized eighteenth-century sovereigns have accomplished their mission while avoiding war. The drawing gained notoriety in contemporary Europe, with bans on its distribution in several European countries.
