= Federalist No. 20 =

Federalist Paper by James Madison

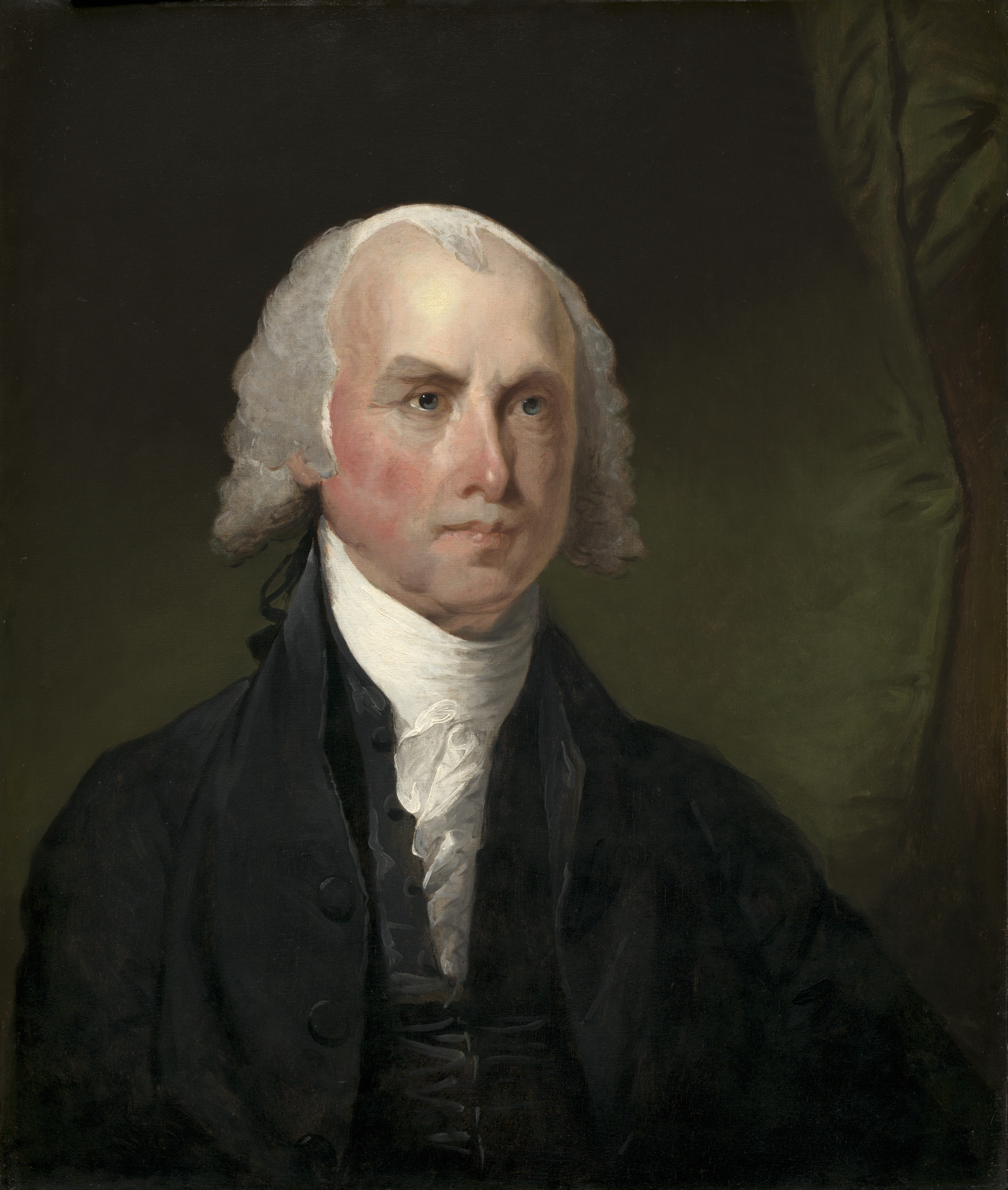
- James Madison, author of Federalist No. 20
- Author: James Madison
- Original title: The Same Subject Continued: The Insufficiency of the Present Confederation to Preserve the Union
- Language: English
- Series: The Federalist
- Publisher: New York Packet
- Publication date: December 11, 1787
- Publication place: United States
- Media type: Newspaper
- Preceded by: Federalist No. 19
- Followed by: Federalist No. 21

Federalist No. 20 is an essay by James Madison, the twentieth of The Federalist Papers. It was first published by The New York Packet on December 11, 1787, under the pseudonym Publius, the name under which all The Federalist papers were published. No. 20 addresses the failures of the Articles of Confederation to satisfactorily govern the United States; it is the last of six essays on this topic. It is titled "The Same Subject Continued: The Insufficiency of the Present Confederation to Preserve the Union".

== Summary ==
Parallels are drawn with the Dutch Republic system of Stadholdership.
