= Federalist No. 18 =

Federalist Paper by James Madison criticizing the Articles of Confederation

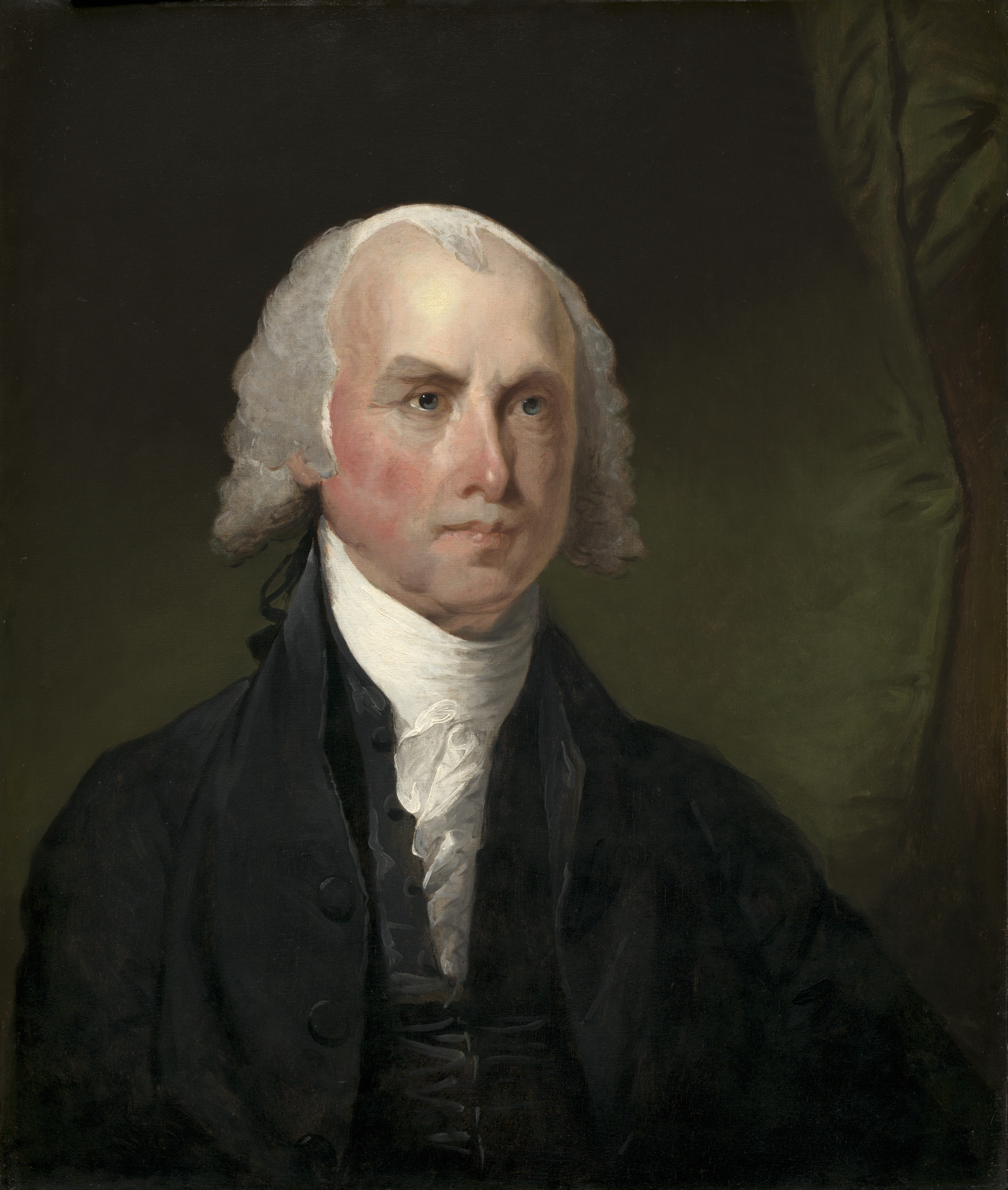
- James Madison, author of Federalist No. 18
- Author: James Madison
- Original title: The Same Subject Continued: The Insufficiency of the Present Confederation to Preserve the Union
- Language: English
- Series: The Federalist
- Publisher: New York Packet
- Publication date: December 7, 1787
- Publication place: United States
- Media type: Newspaper
- Preceded by: Federalist No. 17
- Followed by: Federalist No. 19

Federalist No. 18 is an essay by James Madison, the eighteenth of The Federalist Papers. It was first published by The New York Packet on December 7, 1787, under the pseudonym Publius, the name under which all The Federalist papers were published. No. 18 addresses the failures of the Articles of Confederation to satisfactorily govern the United States; it is the fourth of six essays on this topic. It is titled "The Same Subject Continued: The Insufficiency of the Present Confederation to Preserve the Union". Madison draws historical parallels between the Confederation and Ancient Greece, where both the Amphictyonic League and the Achaean League ended in tyranny and disintegration. This illustrated the importance of a closer union.
