= Federalist No. 17 =

Federalist Paper by Alexander Hamilton

- Alexander Hamilton, author of Federalist No. 17
- Author: Alexander Hamilton
- Original title: The Same Subject Continued: The Insufficiency of the Present Confederation to Preserve the Union
- Language: English
- Series: The Federalist
- Publisher: The Independent Journal
- Publication date: December 5, 1787
- Publication place: United States
- Media type: Newspaper
- Preceded by: Federalist No. 16
- Followed by: Federalist No. 18

Federalist No. 17 is an essay by Alexander Hamilton, the seventeenth of The Federalist Papers. It was first published by The Independent Journal (New York) on December 5, 1787, under the pseudonym Publius, the name under which all The Federalist papers were published. No. 17 addresses the insufficiencies of the Articles of Confederation to satisfactorily govern the United States; it is the third of six essays on this topic. It is titled "The Same Subject Continued: The Insufficiency of the Present Confederation to Preserve the Union".

== Summary ==
Federalist No. 17 specifically regards the possible encroachment by the federal government on the powers of the state governments. Hamilton argues that because states are given the most direct power over their citizens, namely the ability to administer criminal and civil justice, they remain "the most attractive source of popular obedience and attachment". According to Hamilton, this power contributes more than any other circumstance to impressing upon the minds of the people affection, esteem, and reverence towards the government [of the state].

Furthermore, Hamilton says human nature makes it so the people are more closely attached to things they are geographically near, hence a person is more attached to their neighborhood than the community at large. Therefore, "The people of each state would be apt to feel a stronger bias towards their local governments than towards the government of the union."

Because of the reasons listed, Hamilton believes that state governments will have the popular strength to resist encroachment on their states' rights.

== Response ==
The authorship of the essay has been disputed.
