= Constitutional Project for Corsica =

Work by Jean-Jacques Rousseau

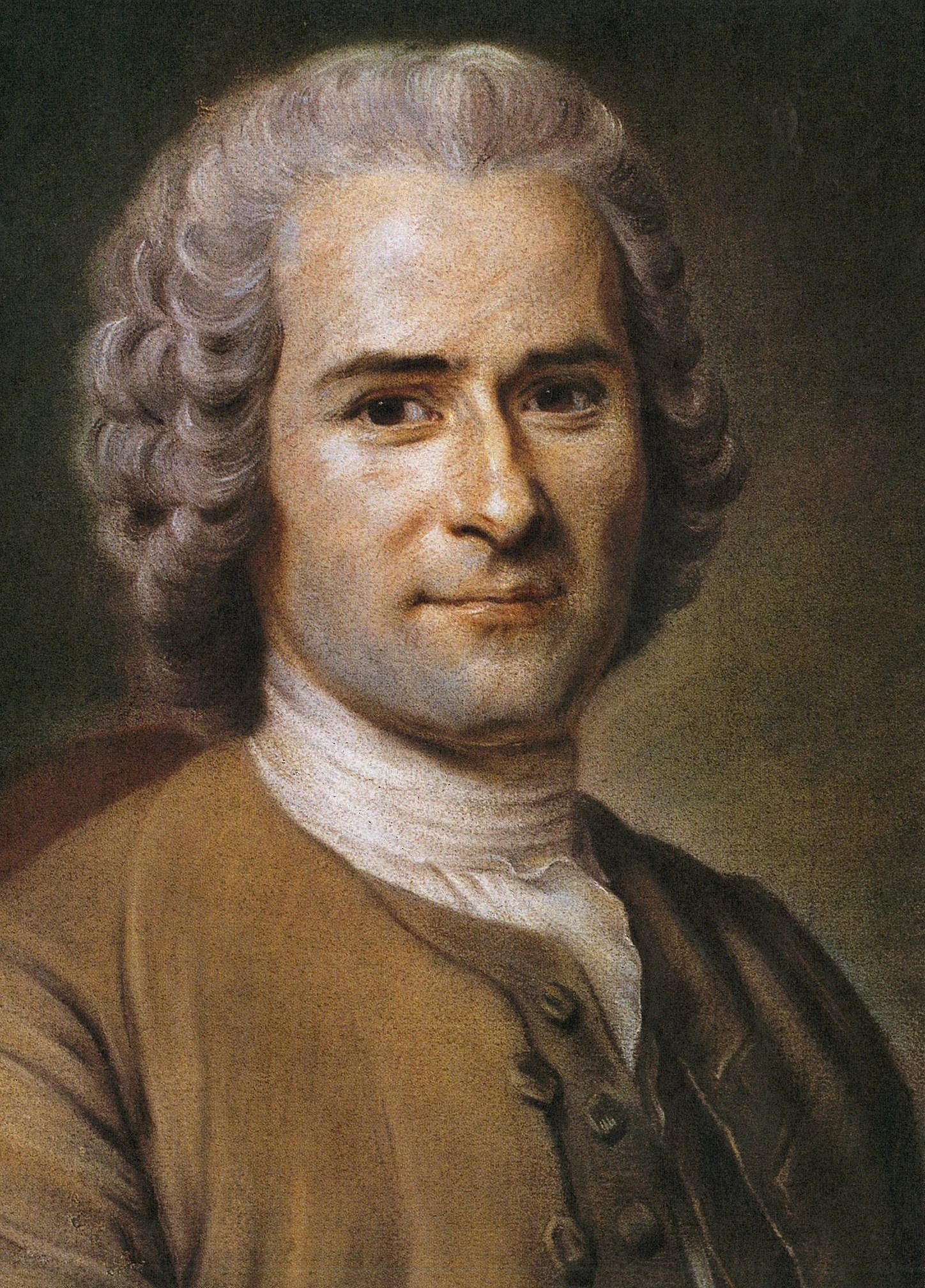
Portrait of Jean-Jacques Rousseau

Constitutional Project for Corsica (French: Projet de constitution pour la Corse) is the second of Jean-Jacques Rousseau's three works on political affairs, following The Social Contract and preceding Considerations on the Government of Poland.

== Background ==
In 1755, Corsica had, under the leadership of Pasquale Paoli, freed itself from being governed by the Republic of Genoa. In The Social Contract, Rousseau had written appreciatively about Corsica:

There is still one country in Europe open to the Lawgiver. It is the island of Corsica. The valor and firmness with which this brave people has shown itself able to regain and defend its freedom richly deserve the aid of some wise man who will teach them how to preserve it. I have a premonition that some day this little island will astonish Europe.

On August 31, 1764, Rousseau received a letter from Matteo Buttafuoco, (Note: Durant spells the first name of this person as Matteo, while Damrosch spells it as Matthieu. Durant says he was a Corsican envoy to France; whereas Damrosch says he was a Corsican officer in the French army.) Corsican envoy to France, inviting Rousseau to be the "wise man" he had spoken of when mentioning Corsica in The Social Contract; essentially Rousseau was being asked to be a law giver for Corsica. Buttafuoco offered to share any knowledge he could to help Rousseau in this task; and stated that Paoli would personally supply any further information Rousseau might require. On October 15, 1764, Rousseau replied accepting the assignment and asking to be furnished with historical details regarding the people of Corsica. On May 26, 1765, Rousseau wrote another letter to Buttafuoco in which he declared, "that for the rest of my life I shall have no other interest but myself and Corsica; all other matters will be completely banished from my thoughts."

Rousseau abandoned this assignment, leaving the work unfinished when France deposed Paoli in 1768 and made Corsica subject to French laws.

== Content ==
The work states that each citizen of Corsica is obliged to swear an oath of allegiance to the Corsican nation. Corsicans are praised for their bravery, but also warned of their vices. They are encouraged to lead an agricultural life since agriculture builds individual character and national health. Laws should be framed to induce people to avoid gathering in cities; trade, commerce, and finance should be discouraged since they lead to fraudulent activities. All traveling should be done on foot or on beast. Early marriage and large families should be encouraged; unmarried citizens over the age of forty should lose their citizenship. The government should exercise control over education and public morality; the Cantons of Switzerland should serve as a model for the form of government. "Rousseau's larger argument was that Corsica should resist modernization at all costs in order to preserve its primitive simplicity," writes Damrosch.

== Comment ==
Ariel and Will Durant suggest that Rousseau was still under the influence of the ideas contained in The Social Contract when he composed the work. Those ideas were abandoned in Rousseau's final work on political affairs, the Considerations on the Government of Poland.

Leo Damrosch comments that Corsica ended up astonishing Europe, as Rousseau had correctly predicted, but the cause for the astonishment was that it had produced Napoleon. Damrosch also suggests that Paoli and Buttafuoco probably had no intention of using the document drafted by Rousseau, and that they wished only to make use of the prestige of his name.

== Scholarship ==
- Li, Hansong (2022). "Timing the Laws: Rousseau’s Theory of Development in Corsica" European Journal of the History of Economic Thought 29 (4): 1-32.
- Hill, Mark (2017). “Enlightened ‘Savages’: Rousseau’s Social Contract and the ‘Brave People’ of Corsica” History of Political Thought 38 (3): 462–493.
- Putterman, Ethan (2001). “Realism and Reform in Rousseau’s Constitutional Projects for Poland and Corsica” Political Studies 49 (3): 481–494.
- Venturi, Franco (1969). Settecento riformatore: L'Italia dei lumi, 1764–1790. Tomo Primo: La rivoluzione di Corsica. Le grandi carestie degli anni sessanta. La Lombardia delle riforme. Torino: G. Einaudi.
