= Federalist No. 21 =

1787 paper by Alexander Hamilton

- Alexander Hamilton, author of Federalist No. 21
- Author: Alexander Hamilton
- Original title: Other Defects of the Present Confederation
- Language: English
- Series: The Federalist
- Publisher: The Independent Journal
- Publication date: December 12, 1787
- Publication place: United States
- Media type: Newspaper
- Preceded by: Federalist No. 20
- Followed by: Federalist No. 22

Federalist No. 21, written by Alexander Hamilton, highlights the defects in the Articles of Confederation. It was first published by The Independent Journal (New York) on December 12, 1787 under the pseudonym Publius, the name under which all The Federalist papers were published. It is titled "Other Defects of the Present Confederation", and explains how the Articles of Confederation failed in 3 ways: by not giving the government enough power to enforce its laws, that the states do not have a guarantee of their rights, and how the states can simply ignore the tax quotas set by the government.

== Background ==
During the 1780s, as the problems of the Articles of Confederation became apparent, two schools of thought emerged. One was the Federalist party, which wanted a strong general government that could unite all of the independent states to protect America from invasion from other countries and from people and groups inside the country who might protest or rebel. With the strong general government of the new constitution, Congress would be able to pass and actually enforce laws and policies around the country. The other party, the anti-federalists, wanted the opposite, a weak general government that had little influence or power over the states, and counted among their supporters Thomas Jefferson, who wrote the Declaration of Independence.

The Federalist Papers are 85 individual articles written by John Jay, Alexander Hamilton, and James Madison and were intended for the people of New York. The purpose of these papers was to convince the states to ratify the United States Constitution by pointing out the flaws in the Articles of Confederation. Jay, Hamilton, and Madison all addressed various issues in the articles, mainly Hamilton writing the majority of them.

== Defect #1: Weak General Government ==
=== Enforcement of Laws ===
Under the Articles of Confederation, the states mainly governed themselves. The general government had little influence on the authoritative role in the United States, though they implemented laws they did not prosecute when those rules were broken. In his essay, Hamilton states "the United States as now composed have no power to exact obedience, or punish disobedience to their resolutions, either by pecuniary mulcts…or by any other constitutional means.". The enforcement of laws was put on the people in the country, deciding for themselves to submit to the laws the national government enacted or disregarding them due to the lack of repercussions. It is stated, by Justice Story, that calling the form of government they had prior to the adoption of the Constitution a "compact" implied that the states would exclusively govern themselves and could decide to breach the contract among themselves. Confusion between the state government and the people would occur, due to the lack of enforcement of the laws from either the state or national government.

This new form of republic would represent both the people and the states and allow states and national governments to coexist. State interests were the route of the Confederation. Americans had to be convinced to put their trust in the "promotion of individual interests and the protection of individual liberty". The Framers were constantly cabining and debating the influence of the government; concluding that a successful authoritative government still respects the individual liberties of those under its laws. The Framers had looked towards history to see that republic and princes had not worked well, both would lead to defect from alliances and leagues when presented in that circumstance. It is stated that a strong general government is needed, but it is essential for states to maintain authority over certain aspects that do not affect the rest. While some power would remain in the constituent polities, government, and others should be given to the "system".

=== Hamilton's Concerns ===
Alexander Hamilton feared that if states, parties, and fractions prevailed, the Union, unless backed by a strong general government, would break into two or three rival confederacies that would be the target of European alliance systems. Along with this, the national government would not intervene with state's internal affairs; the responsibility was put on the states to protect themselves from invasion and from dividing due to internal conflicts. In order for the United States to be a successful country, the states had to stay unified in some way. Had the states maintained their own government and practically became their own entities, they would be at risk towards the invasion from other countries. Hamilton believed separate states would be inferior to the countries that threaten invasion, this would cause more conflicts and would take a greater effort to rectify

== Defect #2: State Protection by the Government ==
Federalist 21 wanted to establish what Hamilton calls "a mutual guarantee of the state government's". This mutual guarantee would be like a security blanket to the states, allowing the national government to give aid in conflict. After the Revolutionary War, the states were in no shape to fight in a war or battle. They were undermanned and underfunded to stage a legitimate counterattack. The government could not protect its states if a state was taken over by a faction. This would cause a lot of problems since the states were separate entities at the time and anyone of them could have invaded their next door neighbor, and the nation was just in a war so they would have been weak and potentially invaded by another country. If that happened, the government would not have been able to do anything like send in soldiers to help fight for the states freedom. Under the Articles of Confederation, the national government had no power to aid the state.

== Defect #3: Monetary Issues ==
The third defect Hamilton focused on was that there was no definite or equal quota that each individual state had to pay. The national debt was increasing, and there was no sort of income tax to diminish this debt. Hamilton advocated for solutions and other ways of minimizing the national debt. He proposed options such as increasing taxes, adapting a new monetary system for the United States, and changing the economic policy. Through the Articles of Confederation, each state was asked to pay a certain amount of money to the National government. "States do not always pay all of the money requested by Congress, but they did pay some. When the situation became dire, one or more states would always come through". There was not an accurate or reasonable way for a government to tax each state individually to reduce the national debt.
