= Federalist No. 15 =

Federalist Paper by Alexander Hamilton

- Alexander Hamilton, author of Federalist No. 15
- Author: Alexander Hamilton
- Original title: The Insufficiency of the Present Confederation to Preserve the Union
- Language: English
- Series: The Federalist
- Publisher: The Independent Journal
- Publication date: December 1, 1787
- Publication place: United States
- Media type: Newspaper
- Preceded by: Federalist No. 14
- Followed by: Federalist No. 16

Federalist No. 15 is an essay by Alexander Hamilton, the fifteenth of The Federalist Papers. It was published by The Independent Journal (New York) on December 1, 1787, under the pseudonym Publius, the name under which all The Federalist papers were published at the time. No. 15 addresses the failures of the Articles of Confederation to satisfactorily govern the United States; it is the first of six essays on this topic. It is titled "The Insufficiency of the Present Confederation to Preserve the Union".

== Essay Synopsis ==
Federalist No. 15 warns citizens of national humiliation that damage the reputation and character of the United States. According to the author the country was militarily weak, disorganized, with no plan to pay its debts, and territory still under British control, as well as a looming conflict with Spain. Publius asks "Are we entitled by nature and compact to a free participation in the navigation of the Mississippi? Spain excludes us from it."

Military capability is stressed, and the United States unable to enforce the terms of the Treaty of Paris: "Are we even in a condition to remonstrate with dignity?"

According to Hamilton, even the moral authority of the United States was compromised: "The just imputations on our own faith, in respect to the same treaty, ought first to be removed".

Hamilton points out that under the Articles of Confederation, the national government only has the authority to declare laws for states to follow. The national government cannot enforce its laws because the states cannot be thrown in jail and without an army, the national government cannot enforce taxes on states.

"[G]overnment implies the power of making laws. It is essential to the idea of a law that it be attended with a sanction; or, in other words, a penalty or punishment for disobedience[.]"

Publius argues that government must have force behind its laws. He reminds the reader that punishment for disobedience is necessary because the "passions of men will not conform to the dictates of reason and justice without this constraint." Punishment of individuals, not states, is necessary because "regard for reputation has a less active influence when the infamy of a bad action is to be divided among a number than when it is to fall singly upon one."

== Background ==
The United States' situation at this time was dire due to large debts, territories in the possession of a foreign power, a lack of military, a lack of money, inability to navigate on the Mississippi River, lack of commerce, lack of respect from foreign powers, decrease in value of property, unavailability of credit, and lack of authority the government had over the nation. This "national disorder, poverty and insignificance" led to Hamilton urging the citizens of the United States to stand up for their safety, tranquility, dignity, and reputation while also attacking those who support the Articles of Confederation. Hamilton claimed the supporters of confederation stood in the way of progress by opposing the ideas of the federalists without providing any plausible options of their own as they were too concerned with making any major changes. In order to proceed with solving many of these issues, the first order of business was changing the current form of government.

== Hamilton's Arguments ==
In Hamilton's opinion, the biggest problem in the government was the principle of legislation for states in a collective manner which created multiple sovereigns. This meant that laws passed by the government, while constitutionally binding, became suggestions that the states could either follow or not follow. This occurred because Confederation legislated only for corporations or communities, not individual people. Such legislation meant that the only way laws involving citizens could be enforced was through violence, which would not happen.

Hamilton believed that because of this, treaties or agreements between states held little value and could not be depended upon. He also believed the states of a country could stand in relation to one another. While it would not be ideal it would be "consistent and practicable", and if there was still desire for a national government, it would have to take on different characteristics. The very idea of a government implies the power to make laws, laws that contain a consequence or penalty that can be applied by a court of law or the military, however, no such system existed under the Articles of Confederation that could enforce the laws, which in effect made the government useless.

For Hamilton, the government was created because the endeavors of men do not conform to the "dictates of reason and justice" and groups of men act less carefully than those acting alone: "Regard to reputation," Hamilton writes, "has a less active influence, when the infamy of a bad action is to be divided among a number than when it is to fall singly upon one." Hamilton also believed that due to the nature of sovereign powers, people became obsessed with their own power. Such obsessions would reduce their desire to compromise, proving that a government cannot be run in such a way. Hamilton ends his argument by attacking the Articles of Confederation, stating that this system was destined to fail, not immediately but slowly, with everyone "yielding to the persuasive voice of immediate interest and convenience, till the frail and tottering edifice seems ready to fall upon our heads and to crush us beneath its ruins".

== The Decision ==
Hamilton examined the flaws of the national government containing multiple sovereigns and proposed a way to fix the country before it was too late. The Constitution, which Hamilton, Jay and Madison were defending, and the Articles of Confederation, distributed power and wealth differently, meaning certain groups of people would be either hurt or benefited by the changes. However, the changes were meant to benefit the United States long term and prevent its collapse. In fact, the majority of people opposing the change did so because their economic or political positions were jeopardized by the new order. Despite the opposition, the Federalists new proposal won decisively over the supporters of Confederation.
