= Federalist No. 16 =

Federalist Paper by Alexander Hamilton

- Alexander Hamilton, author of Federalist No. 16
- Author: Alexander Hamilton
- Original title: The Same Subject Continued: The Insufficiency of the Present Confederation to Preserve the Union
- Language: English
- Series: The Federalist
- Publisher: New York Packet
- Publication date: December 4, 1787
- Publication place: United States
- Media type: Newspaper
- Preceded by: Federalist No. 15
- Followed by: Federalist No. 17

Federalist No. 16, titled "The Same Subject Continued: The Insufficiency of the Present Confederation to Preserve the Union", is an essay by Alexander Hamilton. It is one of the eighty-five articles collected in the document The Federalist Papers (formerly known as The Federalists). The entire collection of papers was written by Alexander Hamilton, James Madison, and John Jay. Federalist Paper No. 16 was first published on December 4, 1787 by The New York Packet (a New York newspaper) under the pseudonym Publius. According to James Madison, "the immediate object of them was to vindicate and recommend the new Constitution to the State of [New York] whose ratification of the instrument, was doubtful, as well as important". In addition, the articles were written and addressed "To the People of New York".

== Purpose ==
=== Supporting the Constitution ===
Federalist Paper 16 addresses the failures of the Articles of Confederation in order to adequately govern the United states and argues for a federal government. Contrary to the Articles of Confederation, that stated, "each state retains its sovereignty, freedom, and independence, and every power, jurisdiction, and right, which is not by this Confederation expressly delegated to the United States, in Congress assembled," Hamilton believed that there should be one general government that should govern both the states and the people. However, people feared a strong national government would gain too much power, and in turn, become tyrannical like the British Monarchy. Hamilton argued that a federal government would be able to do things that the states could not, and that without a national government, the Confederacy would inevitably fall victim to war or a separation in the states.

By addressing the failures of the Articles of Confederation, Hamilton promoted the ratification of the new Constitution (which later replaced the Articles of Confederation). He illustrates that the new constitution will be the most beneficial for the majority of people. He does this by explaining that the purpose of the government is to create laws and decisions that protect the safety and tranquility of the people and the Union. With the new constitution and a strong federal government, Hamilton states that the confederacy will be able to achieve the best possible outcome.

=== Unifying the States ===
Hamilton's main goal was to unify the separate states with a strong general government and military. Without a large, standing, national army, he feared there would be a war between the states, and argued that the strongest state would triumph in every disagreement between the states. In Federalist 16, Hamilton argued that unifying the separate states with one strong general government and army would solve these issues by setting up a federal form of government that would clearly enumerate the powers of the national government, reserve other powers to the states, check and balance the national government's power by dividing it into three branches, and provide representative government that was accountable to the people.

In Federalist 16, Hamilton argued that only a federal government could provide laws that would affect the entire nation's citizenry uniformly, and that any state encroachments on federal powers would be obvious, writing, "if the execution of the laws of the national government should not require the intervention of the State legislatures, if they were to pass into immediate operation upon the citizens themselves, the particular governments could not interrupt their progress without an open and violent exertion of an unconstitutional power. No omissions nor evasions would answer the end. They would be obliged to act, and in such a manner as would leave no doubt that they had encroached on the national rights."

=== Vulnerability of the States ===
Before the constitution was ratified the country was vulnerable. There was a fear of a civil war, which would increase vulnerability. At that time the states were disconnected, which made it harder to establish government and a stable union. If there was no union, the ratification of the constitution would have been hard to make happen. In Federalist 16, it is also stressed that the states need some control in order for the constitution to be accepted. If they are not exposed to the thought of a new constitution that will benefit everyone, there is a possibility that one state will become excessively powerful and try to rule the country in their own way. Hamilton explains "If the State was large it would have influence with others who would join the resistance. If smaller, alliances would form prior to insurrection. Eventually if Federal laws only compelled States to compliance and the only remedy to non-compliance was force, then "the first war of this kind would probably terminate in a dissolution of the Union". A more natural death than this violent death would be what is being experienced with the Articles of Confederacy where States in total join in non-compliance giving various excuses of inability to comply thus precluding military action".

As said in Federalist 16, the new constitution would provide for the growing number of states as a whole. There was a hope for an army that can provide safety for all who are citizens of America and a need for strong individuals, both physically and mentally, who could provide the protection. Federalist 16 explains the states need a new national constitution to be put in motion that could put together a large and cohesive army that will stand behind the country and the government. The constitution was intended to bring stability in government and give the country a unified rule so that there would not be multiple small factions that would try to rule their own way, with many misunderstandings and no concise rule.
