= Considerations on the Government of Poland =

Essay by Jean-Jacques Rousseau

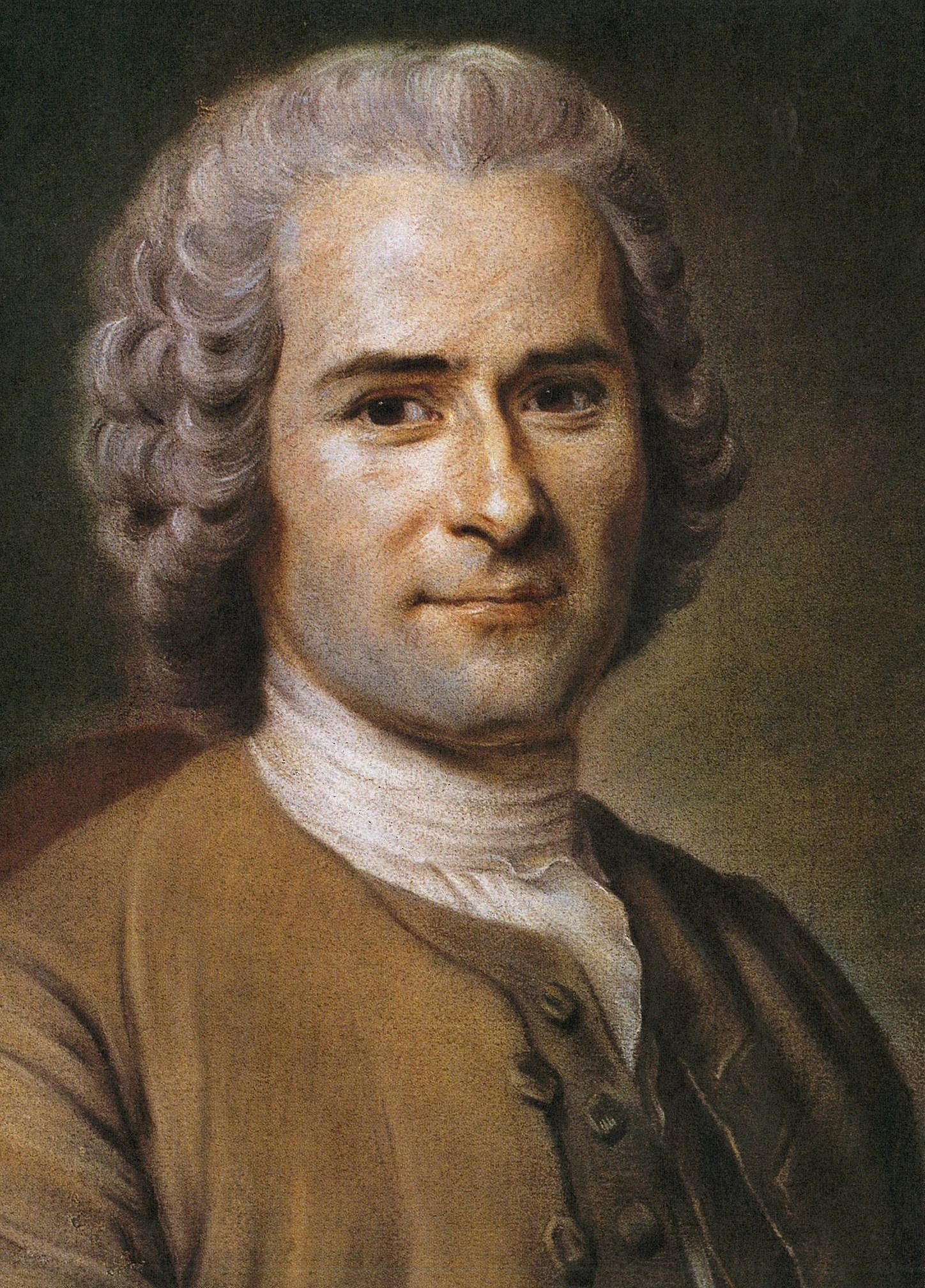
Portrait of Jean-Jacques Rousseau

Considerations on the Government of Poland — also simply The Government of Poland or, in the original French, Considérations sur le gouvernement de Pologne (1782) — is an essay by Swiss philosopher Jean-Jacques Rousseau concerning the design of a new constitution for the people of Poland (or more exactly, the Polish–Lithuanian Commonwealth). It represents Rousseau's last venture into political theory.

To many readers, The Government of Poland is surprising in the degree to which its recommendations sometimes defy the principles expressed in Rousseau's more famous work, The Social Contract. Contrary to the perception of Rousseau as a radical — a view again largely based on The Social Contract — in The Government of Poland Rousseau displays caution and conservatism: "Never forget, as you dream of what you wish to gain, what you might lose."

== Commission ==
After Poland found itself in a challenging situation due to outside forces, Rousseau and Gabriel Bonnot de Mably were asked to submit suggestions for the reformation of Poland's unique "Golden Liberty", which had deteriorated from a semi-republican, semi-democratic political system into a state of virtual anarchy.

Mably's recommendations were completed in two installments, the first in August 1770 and the second in July 1771. Generally, he called for more radical and substantial changes than Rousseau was to suggest; he was also able to finish his recommendations in a more timely fashion than Rousseau. It was not until 1772 that Rousseau completed his essay. By the time he finished, the First Partition of Poland had already occurred, on February 17, 1772. Russia, Prussia and Austria had invaded and occupied much of Poland.

The Government of Poland was not published until after Rousseau's death.

== Structure and recommendations ==
The work is divided into fifteen chapters of greatly varying length. The original is in French, Rousseau's native language, but there exist translations into a number of languages.

Among other issues, Rousseau addresses his belief that small states can prosper while large states slip into anarchy or despotism. He recommends that surpassing any constitutional reforms, the most important reform Poland could make would be the adoption of a federal system. Specifically, Rousseau advocates a federation of the existing voivodeships. In recommending the creation of smaller states, Rousseau recognizes the imminent First Partition with the words: "If you wish to reform your government, then, begin by narrowing your frontiers, though perhaps your neighbors intend to do that for you."

== Within Rousseau's oeuvre ==
While The Social Contract is considered Rousseau's most important political commentary, his attempts in The Government of Poland to apply the principles described The Social Contract to concrete problems elucidate the major work. Besides The Government of Poland, the only other work in which he attempts this is the Constitutional Project for Corsica (see also Corsican Constitution), a work which is only fragmentary. Thus, The Government of Poland provides perhaps our best perspective on how Rousseau believed his overarching principles could be applied to realistic situations. As Rousseau's last political work, the essay can also be viewed as the final culmination of his political thought.

Rousseau's work influenced the Polish Constitution of May 3, 1791, the world's second modern codified constitution.
