= Federalist No. 14 =

Federalist Paper by James Madison

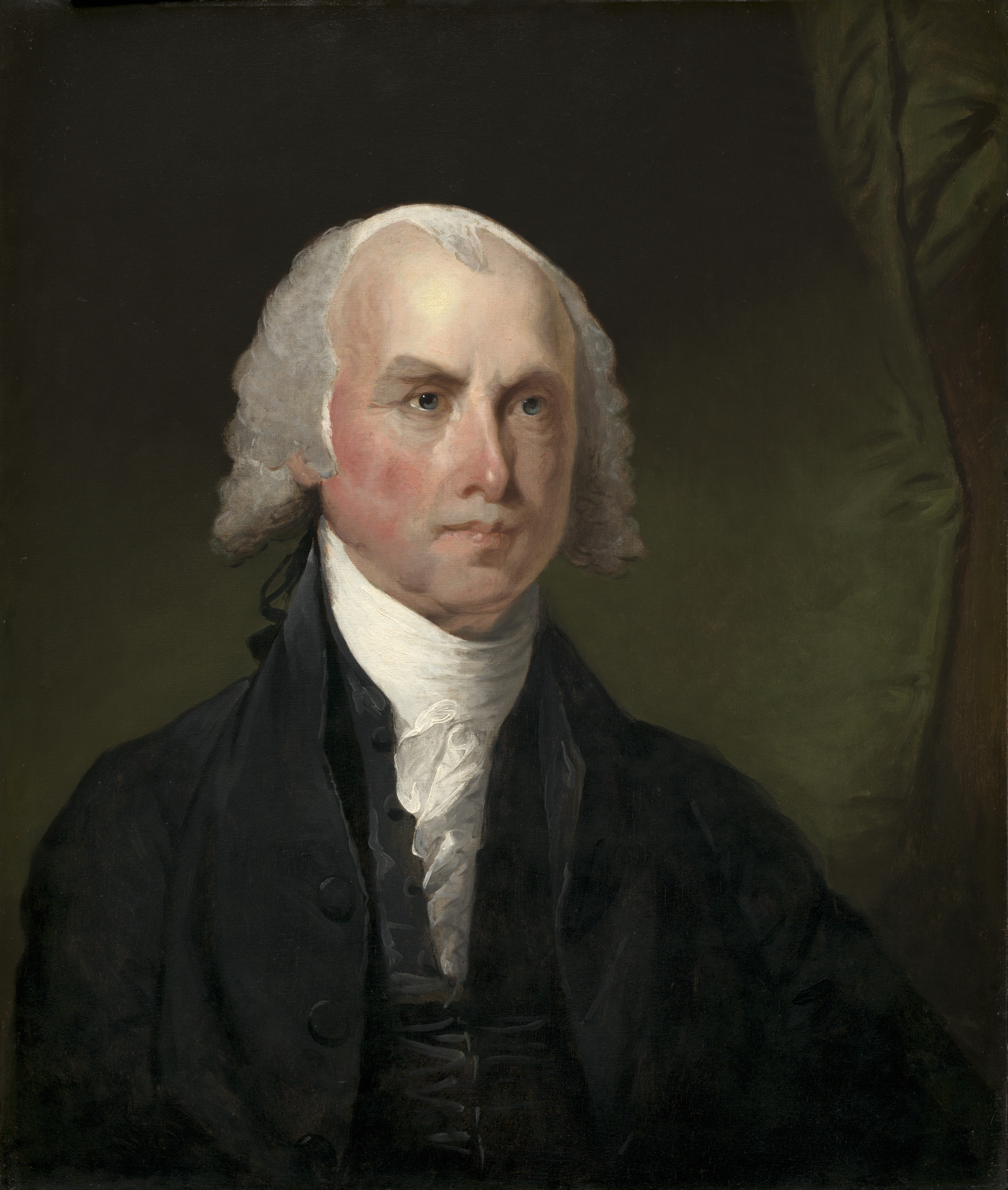
- James Madison, author of Federalist No. 14
- Author: James Madison
- Original title: Objections to the Proposed Constitution From Extent of Territory Answered
- Language: English
- Series: The Federalist
- Publisher: New York Packet
- Publication date: November 30, 1787
- Publication place: United States
- Media type: Newspaper
- Preceded by: Federalist No. 13
- Followed by: Federalist No. 15

Federalist No. 14 is an essay by James Madison titled "Objections to the Proposed Constitution From Extent of Territory Answered". This essay is the fourteenth of The Federalist Papers. It was first published in The New York Packet on November 30, 1787 under the pseudonym Publius, the name under which all The Federalist papers were published. It addresses a major objection of the Anti-Federalists to the proposed United States Constitution: that the sheer size of the United States would make it impossible to govern justly as a single country. Madison touched on this issue in Federalist No. 10 and returns to it in this essay.

== Background ==
When the thirteen colonies separated from Great Britain, they instated a national government under the framework outlined by the Articles of Confederation. Under that administration, the national government had very limited powers, allowing the States to function independently, as the Article reads: "each state retain[ed] its sovereignty, freedom, and independence, and every power, jurisdiction, and right."

However, the Articles of Confederation did not prove to be effective, so in 1786, leaders called a meeting dubbed the Annapolis Convention to discuss the issues of the government. This meeting led to the Constitutional Convention of 1787 to discuss the formation of a new government and led to the writing of the United States Constitution. The Constitution proposed a stronger general government in which there would be three branches: Legislative, Executive, and Judicial. Many concerns with the proposed document were presented by the Anti-Federalists. For the Constitution to be ratified, their concerns needed to be addressed and put to rest.

Three delegates, Alexander Hamilton, James Madison, and John Jay, recognized this hesitancy and took it upon themselves to defend and explicate the meaning and benefits of the Constitution. Together they penned 85 essays, dubbed The Federalist (later in the 20th century they became known as The Federalist Papers), all which were printed in New York newspapers under the pseudonym "Publius" addressed "To the People of the State of New York." After 85 Federalist essays and 10 months of deliberation, the Constitution was ratified on July 21, 1788.

The 14th Federalist Paper, addressed the topics of identifying the form of government which the Union was trying to attain, the size of the Union, the separation of powers between the general government and the States, the traveling within the Union, and the benefits in regards to States at the borderline of the Union.

== Republic vs. Democracy ==
The first topic that Madison addresses is the differentiation between a republic and a democracy.

George Clinton, the Governor of New York and one of the foremost authors of the Anti-Federalist papers at the time of the ratification of the Constitution, cited Montesquieu, a political philosopher who authored "The Spirit of the Laws", to support his argument. In Clinton's third essay, "Extent of Territory under Consolidated Government Too Large to Preserve Liberty or Protect Property," he asserts that the merging all of the States to become one country with a serious government would render the proposed mode of government unsuccessful. Again referencing Montesquieu, Clinton argues that in order for a republic to succeed, it must be within a small territory. If not, then it would be likely that "an ambitious person" would gain too much power, abuse it, and use it to oppress the people.

In response to Clinton's concern, Madison explains that Clinton has simply confused a republic with a democracy. Madison previously wrote at length regarding the differences between a democracy and the republic that the Federalists propose in Federalist 10. Therefore, in this essay, he consolidates his argument by simply defining the two government forms, referring the readers to "preceding papers". He delineates a democracy as a government that is exercised by the meeting of all of the people, while a republic is administered via "representatives and agents." Madison therefore counters Clinton's assertion that a small territory is necessary for the success of a republic by explaining that the examples of ancient Greece and "modern" Italy were not failed republics but rather unstable, failed democracies.

The reason that the opportunity for "an ambitious person" to arise only exists in a democracy rather than a republic is because in a democracy, the government is run by an assemblage of all of the citizens of the state who then execute all necessary duties. Without leadership, instability is almost definite which then provides an opportunity for an individual to rise up and establish a monarchial form of government in which a single person has absolute power. However, in what is now dubbed the Madisonian Model, Madison designed a model of government in which the possibility for this occurrence is no longer achievable. Madison recognized the issue that Montesquieu brought to attention; he solved the matter by utilizing a brainchild of Montesquieu. In the Union's republic, there will be a system of checks and balances. Madison constructed a government made of three branches: each branch has its specified responsibilities and powers as well as each branch performs "checks and balances" on the others. These two aspects make certain that no one group or person within the government obtains too much control or power, thereby invalidating Clinton's concerns.

== The Size of the Union ==
Another point that Clinton brings down is also according to Montesquieu, who says that a republic can only survive if it remains in a small territory. However, after Madison clarifies the difference between democracy and a republic, he states that it is the democratic government which is "confined to a small spot," rather than a republic which "may be extended over a large region." The reasoning, Madison explains, is that in a democracy, when an assembly is necessary, then all of the citizens need to convene. This becomes difficult when the territory is large and the citizens are spread out. However, with a republic, only the representatives need to gather, therefore, the assigned meeting place just needs to be reachable by all.

Madison supports his point by bringing down that since the first assembly of the colonial delegates at the Continental Congress on September 5, 1774 to the Constitutional Convention in 1787, representatives have been meeting without issue. Over the past thirteen years, Madison explains, the representatives have met without agents from the further States beings absent more than those agents from the States closer to the meeting point.

Madison continues to address the concern regarding the size of the Union by going through the "actual dimensions of the Union." An anti-Federalist labeled "Federal Farmer" published an essay, "Federal Farmer II," on October 9, 1787 exclaiming that "it would be impossible to collect a representation of the parts of the country five, six, and seven hundred miles from the seat of the government" with the "extensive [size of the] country." Madison goes through "the [territorial] limits, as fixed by the treaty of peace" by stating exact degrees at which the borders lie and computing the distances. He explains that although the number may seem daunting, it is actually a reasonable distance. Madison brings down that the size of the Union is only slightly larger than Germany and Poland, before its disintegration, both of which regularly has/had successful conventions of their "national diet." He then explains that Great Britain, although smaller in size, because it is an island, the distance in which a representative must travel for a Parliament meeting is far greater than necessary in the Union. If these European countries, similar in size/travel distance to the Union, were capable of having their representatives assemble productively, then there is no reason why the Union cannot do the same.

The Federal Farmer continued his grievance in "Federal Farmer II" by moving from advocating for the representatives to advocating for the citizens. He claimed that the citizens will have to travel a mean of 150 to 200 miles to attend court because of the federal system. Madison responded to this and to similar complaints by remarking that once the Union is established, transportation improvements will be made ranging from shortening of roads, the construction of interstate canals, to bettering traveler's accommodations. Madison is implying that although the area may seem vast, advances will be done to facilitate travelers.

== The States as Frontiers ==
Madison explains that States that are on the perimeter of the Union will be subject to the confrontations of surrounding nations. At those times, the State will be in need of man-power and resources. Madison analyzes that although it may be inconvenient for a State that is far from the designated government convention location to send a representative, the State would be able to receive support financially and in fighting. Therefore, upon a cross-benefit analysis, a State on the border of the Union who may suffer from its distant location, would attain more benefit from the formation of the Union in "other respects" that it would be worthwhile to take part in it.

== A Republic with Both Federal and State Governments ==
Madison expounds on a fundamental concept of the government that the Federalists are proposing. The Union will have a general government which will have limited jurisdiction to matters that concern all of the members of the republic, and then, in order to maintain a stable republic, there will be subordinate governments in which each State will have its own government. The States will have authority over all "subjects which can be separately provided for" and those citizens who reside within their State.

By mentioning this point, Madison neutralized three concerns of the anti-Federalist: one mentioned by Federal Farmer and two brought up by George Clinton.

- On October 7, 1787, Federal Farmer published that he was uneasy about the division of powers between the general and State governments people.
- Federal Farmer II also suggests that the representation of the people is uncertain. Madison's explanation responds to his doubt in the matter because the government with both a general republican national government and a State republican government means that the people will be represented at both the Federal and the State levels.
- Clinton exclaims in his essay "Extent of Territory under Consolidated Government Too Large to Preserve Liberty or Protect Property" that in a large republic, the citizen's voices will be drowned out and abuses will be extensive. However, this concern is defused by Madison's explanation.
  - With the concern of voices being drowned out, the existence of the State governments means that there will be the benefits of the small republic in which as Montesquieu says "the interest of the public is more obvious, better understood, and more within the reach of every citizen" while having all of the benefits of a general republican government. Although there will be a general government which not all voices are heard, the smaller State governments will take note of them.
  - With the concern of abuses, Clinton quoted Montesquieu who only had ancient Rome to look to for an example of a large Republic. What happened in ancient Rome was its governors would be interested in making a lot of money, they would go to far off provinces and extort the tax farmers. "There was usually collusion between the governor and the tax contractors and the senate was too far away to exercise any effective control." However, the plan of the Federalists is to have the State governments which will prevent events such as those to occur. Madison concludes this subject by stating that the anti-Federalists do not have grounds for a concern because their plan is not to abolish the State governments but rather for them to remain intact and to harmonize the large general government.

== Other Points Mentioned ==
In addition to the points mentioned above, Madison also briefly writes about the expansion of the Union.

Madison concludes his essay by asking the people of New York to choose the Union and not the disunion of the States.
