= Federalist No. 22 =

Federalist Paper by Alexander Hamilton

- Alexander Hamilton, author of Federalist No. 22
- Author: Alexander Hamilton
- Original title: The Same Subject Continued: Other Defects of the Present Confederation
- Language: English
- Series: The Federalist
- Publisher: New York Packet
- Publication date: December 14, 1787
- Publication place: United States
- Media type: Newspaper
- Preceded by: Federalist No. 21
- Followed by: Federalist No. 23

Federalist No. 22 is an essay by Alexander Hamilton, the twenty-second of The Federalist Papers. It was first published by The New York Packet on December 14, 1787, under the pseudonym "Publius", the name under which all The Federalist papers were published. This essay continues with a theme started in Federalist No. 21. It is titled "The Same Subject Continued: Other Defects of the Present Confederation".

The power to regulate commerce is one of the strongest reasons to switch from the Articles of Confederation to a stronger "federal superintendence." The lack of a general authority "to regulate commerce" "has operated as a bar to the formation of beneficial treaties with foreign powers" and has also led to dissatisfaction between the states. Several States have attempted to create concert "prohibitions, restrictions, and exclusions, to influence the conduct of that kingdom in this particular" area. However, "arising from the lack of a general authority, and from clashing and dissimilar views in the States, has hitherto frustrated every experiment of the kind, and will continue to" hinder the true growth that could be realized under a federal system.

Aside from the regulation of commerce, the power to raise and keep an army, under the powers of the Articles of Confederation, is merely a power of making requisitions upon the states for quotas of men. "This practice in the course of the late war, was found replete with obstructions to a vigorous, and to an economical system of defense." Publius went on to state that this led to a competition between the states, which turned into an auction for men. Having states bid on men for defense, "is not merely unfriendly to economy and vigor, than it is to an equal distribution of the burden."

Also, Publius states, that the right of equal suffrage among the states is "another exceptionable part of the Confederation." And that "The sense of the majority should prevail. However this kind of logical legerdemain will never counteract the plain suggestions of justice and common sense." He then argues that it is entirely possible that there can be a majority - seven - of the States in favor of something, which would then carry the support of Congress, but which would have far less than a majority of the actual population of the Union. And he adds to this argument, "for we can enumerate nine states, which contain less than a majority of the people and it is constitutionally possible, that these nine may give the vote."

The overall gist of Federalist No. 22, is that the current constitutional structure of the Union under the Confederation is weak and unable to support the demands that are required of a modern nation or a continental republic.
