= Federalist No. 19 =

Federalist Paper by James Madison

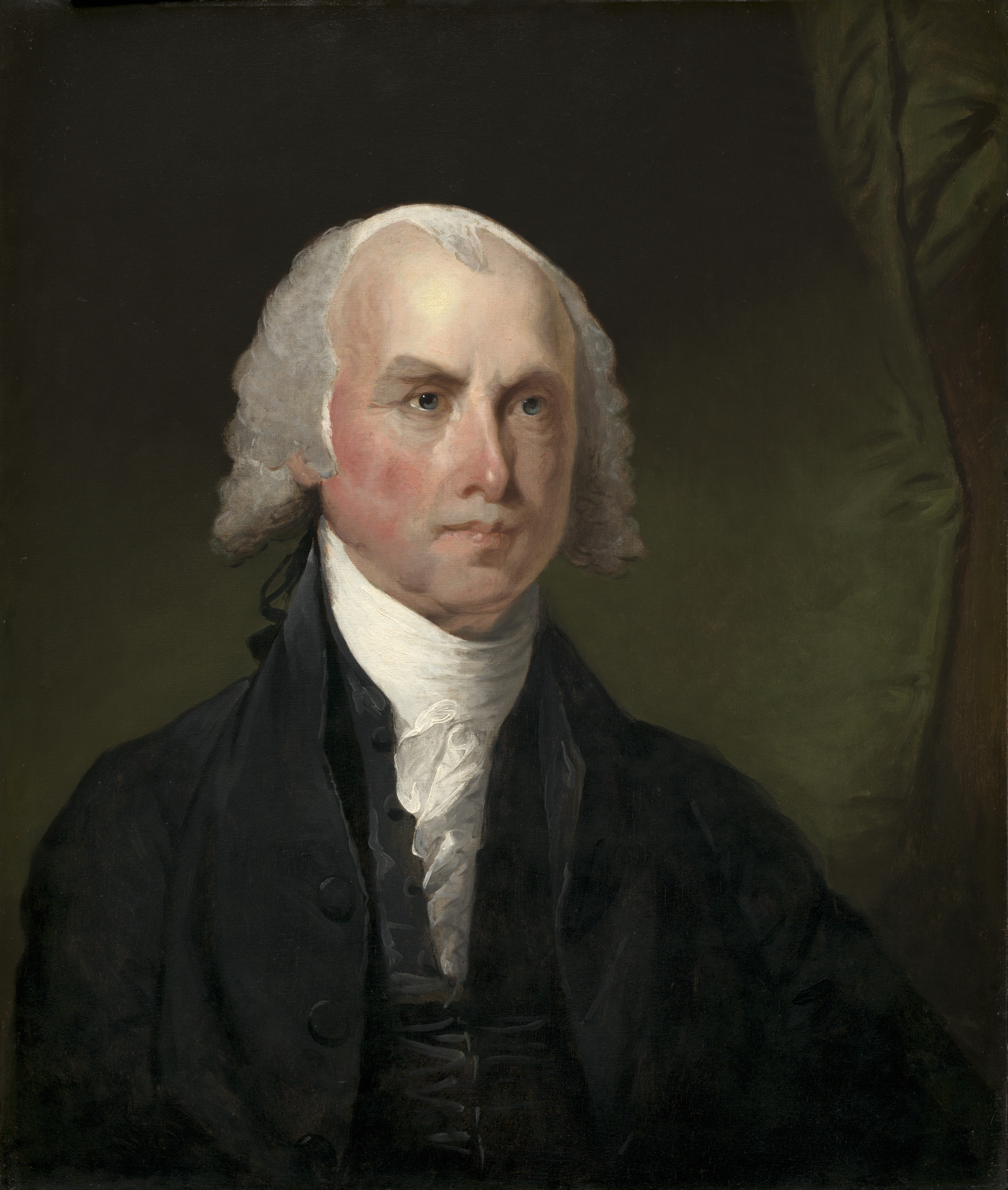
- James Madison, author of Federalist No. 19
- Author: James Madison
- Original title: The Same Subject Continued: The Insufficiency of the Present Confederation to Preserve the Union
- Language: English
- Series: The Federalist
- Publisher: The Independent Journal
- Publication date: December 8, 1787
- Publication place: United States
- Media type: Newspaper
- Preceded by: Federalist No. 18
- Followed by: Federalist No. 20

Federalist No. 19 is an essay by James Madison, the nineteenth of The Federalist Papers. It was first published by The Independent Journal (New York) on December 8, 1787, under the pseudonym Publius, the name under which all The Federalist papers were published. No. 19 addresses the failures of the Articles of Confederation to satisfactorily govern the United States; it is the fifth of six essays on this topic. It is titled "The Same Subject Continued: The Insufficiency of the Present Confederation to Preserve the Union". Contemporary comparisons are made with "the Germanic body" (the Kingdom of Germany), a community of sovereigns that support a feeble and precarious union; Poland, unfit for self-government and self-defense; and Switzerland, in practice a severed league due to differences of religion.
