= History of the United States Congress =

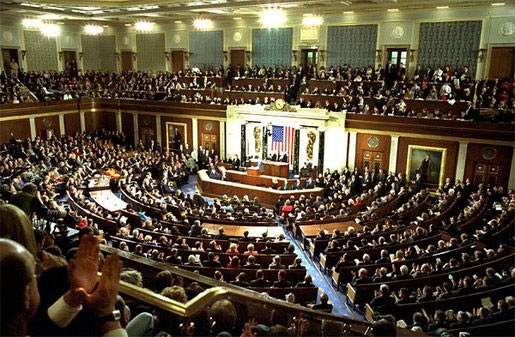
George W. Bush delivered his annual State of the Union address to a joint session of Congress on January 28, 2003, in the House chamber.

The history of the United States Congress refers to the chronological record of the United States Congress including legislative sessions from 1789 to the present day. It also includes a brief history of the Continental Congress from 1774 through 1781 and the Congress of the Confederation from 1781 to 1789.

The United States Congress first organized in 1789, is an elected bicameral democratic legislative body established by Article I of the United States Constitution, ratified in 1788. It consists of an upper chamber, the senate with 2 members per state, and a lower chamber, the House of Representatives, with a variable number of members per state based on population. The bicameral structure of the Congress was modeled on the bicameral legislatures of the Thirteen Colonies, which in turn were modeled on the bicameral structure of the English Parliament.

The politics of Congress have been defined by members' affiliation with political parties. From the earliest days, politicians and the public have adopted a de facto 2-party political system. Membership in parties has at different times been defined by ideology, economics, rural/urban and geographic divides, religion, and populism.

In different periods of American history, the role of Congress shifted along with changing relations with the other branches of government and was sometimes marked by intense partisanship and other times by cooperation across the aisle. Generally, Congress was more powerful in the 19th century than in the 20th century, when the presidency (particularly during wartime) became a more dominant branch.

One analyst examining congressional history suggested there were four main eras, with considerable overlap, and these included the formative era (1780s–1820s), the partisan era (1830s–20th century), the committee era (1910s–1960s), and the contemporary era (1970s–today).

== Formative era (1780s–1820s) ==
=== Continental Congresses ===
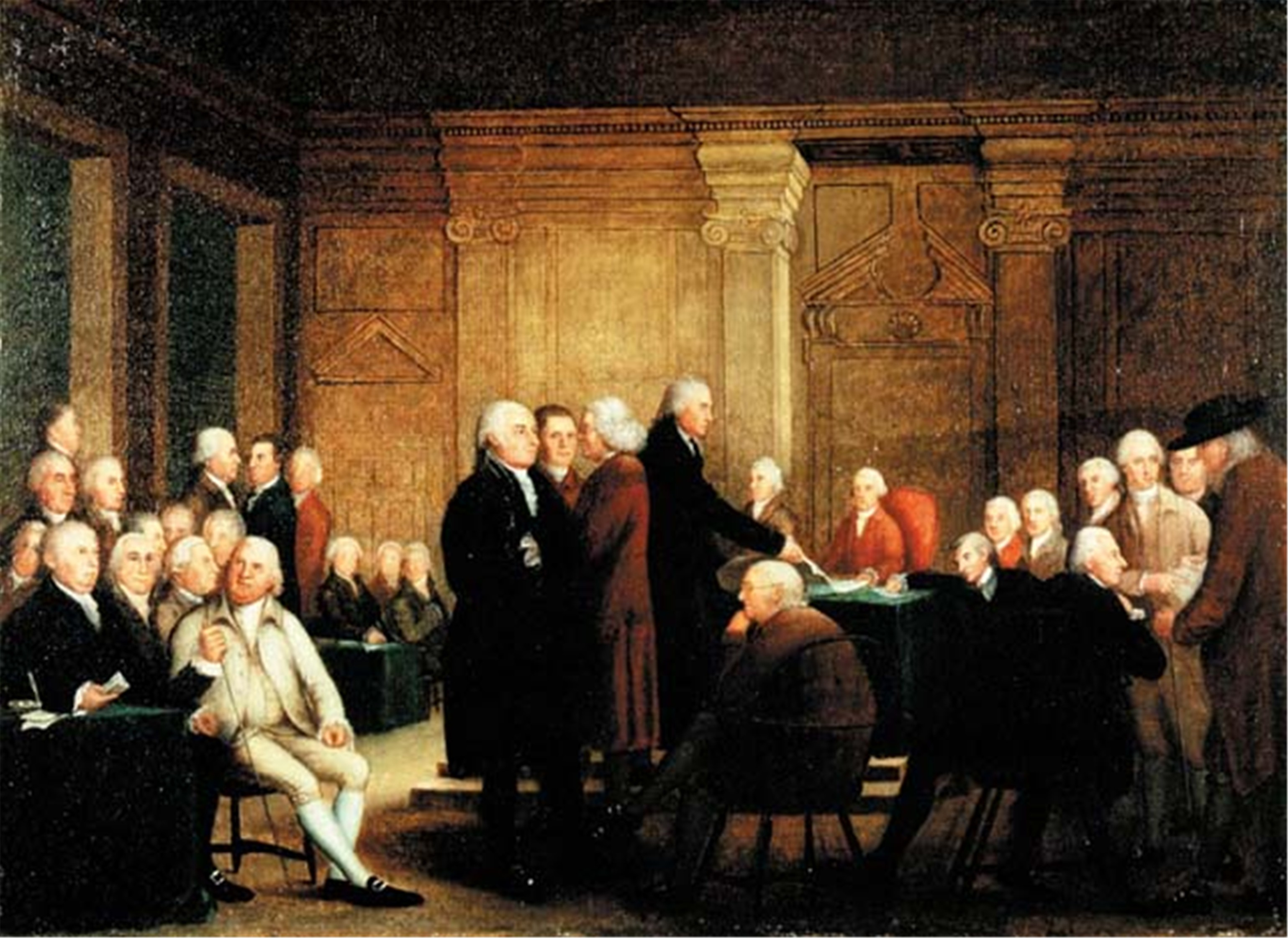
Congress Voting Independence, by Robert Edge Pine, depicts the Second Continental Congress voting in 1776.

Although one can trace the history of the Congress of the United States to the First Continental Congress, which met in the autumn of 1774, the true antecedent of the United States Congress was convened on May 10, 1775, with twelve colonies in attendance. A year later, on July 4, 1776, the Continental Congress declared the thirteen colonies free and independent states, referring to them as the "United States of America". The Second Continental Congress was the national government until March 1, 1781, supervised the war and diplomacy, and adopted the Articles of Confederation before the States ratified it in 1781. One common term for patriot was "Congress Man"—a supporter of Congress against the King. The Congress of the Confederation governed the United States for eight years (March 1, 1781, to March 4, 1789). There was no chief executive or president before 1789, so Congress governed the United States.

=== Congresses of the Confederation ===
The Articles of Confederation was written in 1776 and came into effect in 1781. This established a weak central government, with only a unicameral body, in which each state was equally represented and each had a veto over most actions. There was no executive or judicial branch. This congress was given limited authority over foreign affairs and military matters, but not to collect taxes, regulate interstate commerce, or enforce laws. This system of government did not work well, with economic fights among the states, and an inability to suppress rebellion or guarantee the national defense.

John Shaw Flag (red first variation)

John Shaw Flag (white first variation)

Annapolis became the temporary capital of the United States after the signing of the Treaty of Paris in 1783. Congress was in session in the state house from November 26, 1783, to June 3, 1784, and it was in Annapolis on December 23, 1783, that General Washington resigned his commission as commander-in-chief of the Continental Army.

For the 1783 Congress, the governor of Maryland commissioned John Shaw, a local cabinet maker, to create an American flag. The flag is slightly different from other designs of the time. The blue field extends over the entire height of the hoist. Shaw created two versions of the flag: one which started with a red stripe and another that started with a white one.

In 1787, a convention, to which delegates from all the states of the Union were invited, was called to meet in Annapolis to consider measures for the better regulation of commerce; but delegates came from only five states (New York, Pennsylvania, Virginia, New Jersey, and Delaware), and the convention, known afterward as the "Annapolis Convention", without proceeding to the business for which it had met, passed a resolution calling for another convention to meet at Philadelphia in the following year to amend the Articles of Confederation. The Philadelphia convention drafted and approved the Constitution of the United States, which is still in force.

=== United States Congress ===
In May 1787, a Convention met in the Philadelphia State House for the purpose of resolving problems with the Articles of Confederation. Instead, the Articles were scrapped entirely, and a new Constitution was drafted. All states agreed to send delegates, except Rhode Island. One of the most divisive issues facing the convention was the way which structure of Congress would be defined. The practice of having "two-house" bicameral legislatures (bicameral from the Latin camera meaning chamber) was well established in state governments by 1787. Edmund Randolph's Virginia Plan argued for a bicameral Congress; the lower house would be elected directly by the people whereas the upper house would be elected by the lower house. The plan attracted support of delegates from large states as it called for representation based on population. The smaller states, however, favored the New Jersey Plan, which had a unicameral Congress with equal representation for the states. Arguments between Federalists and Anti-Federalists about congressional scope, power, role, and authority happened before ratification of the Constitution and continue, to varying extents, to the present day. Generally, the Constitution gave more powers to the federal government, such as regulating interstate commerce, managing foreign affairs and the military, and establishing a national currency. These were seen as essential for the success of the new nation and to resolve the disputes that had arisen under the Articles of Confederation, but the states retained sovereignty over other affairs. Eventually, a "compromise", known as the Connecticut Compromise or the Great Compromise was settled; one house of Congress would provide proportional representation, whereas the other would provide equal representation. To preserve further the authority of the states, the compromise proposed that state legislatures, rather than the people, would elect senators.

To protect against abuse of power at the federal level, the Constitution mandated separation of powers, with responsibilities divided among the executive, legislative, and judicial branches. The Constitution was ratified by the end of 1788, and its full implementation was set for March 4, 1789.

The Constitution defines the Senate as having two senators for each state in the Union. The size of the House of Representatives is based on the number of states and their populations. The numerical size of the House is set by law, not by the Constitution. The House grew in size as states were admitted throughout the 19th century, and as the nation grew in population. Since the Constitution allows for one representative for as few as 30,000 citizens, Congress passed new, higher limits for the House, which grew in size until a law passed in 1911, based on the 1910 United States census, established the present upper limit of 435 members of the House. Since the House's size was fixed but the population kept growing, instead of a congressperson representing only 30,000 citizens (as the Constitution had previously established), a congressperson represents 600,000 and more persons. There have also been and continue to be a small number of non-voting members who represent U.S. territories.

=== 1790s ===
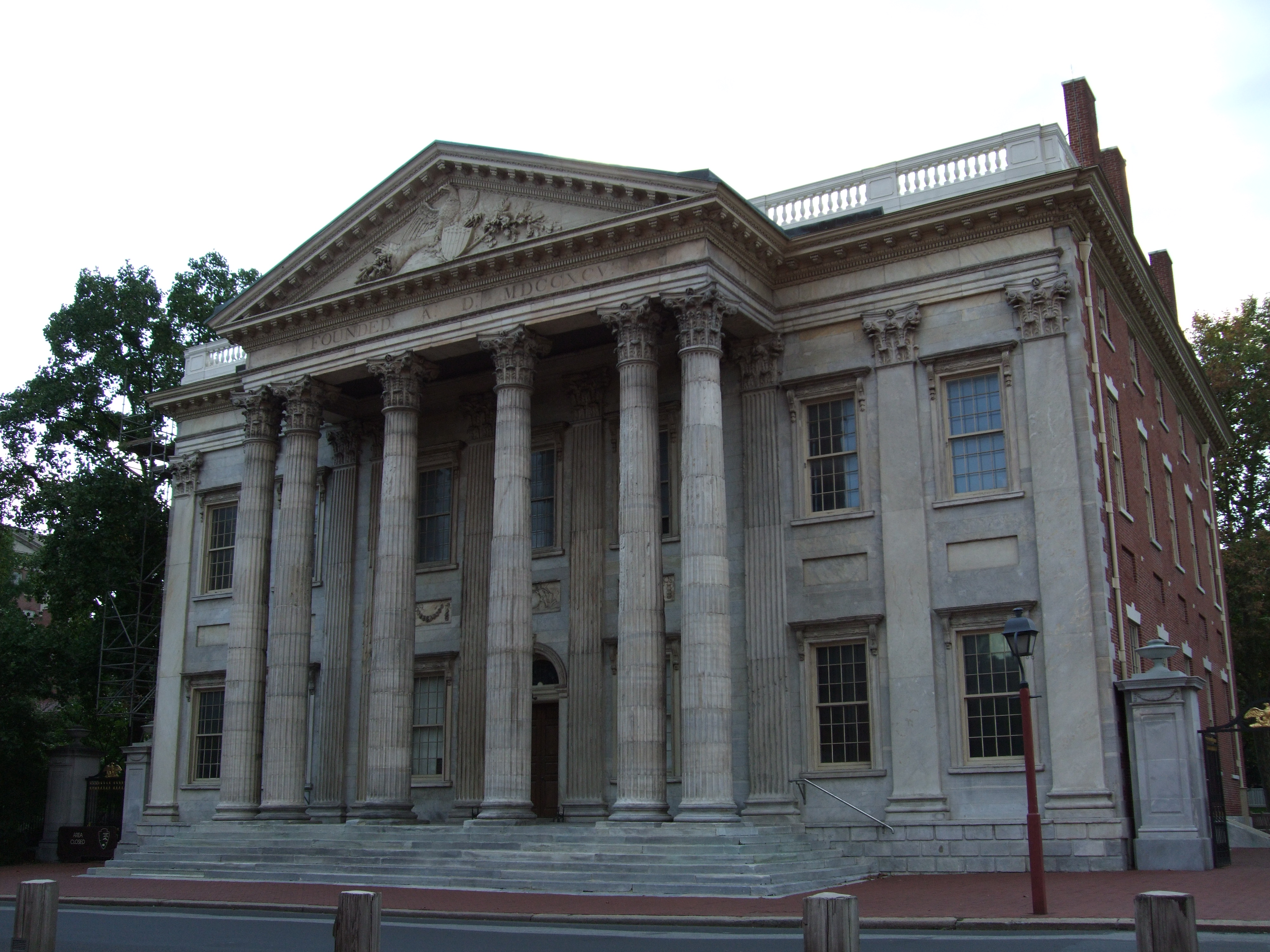
The Second Bank of the United States was the source of considerable controversy from the 1820s through 1840s.

The Constitution remained the main issue for Americans until the 1792 elections, consisting of a battle between the U.S. Federalist Party (Pro-Administration Party), which supported the Constitution and the Anti-Federalist Party (Anti-Administration Party), which opposed the Constitution. After the first congressional and presidential elections took place in 1789, the Federalists had control over US Congress. Between 1792 and 1800 the struggle over Congress came between Alexander Hamilton's Federalist Party- which was popular through the successful First Bank of the United States, until 1792- and Thomas Jefferson's Democratic Republican Party. Jefferson's party managed to finally gain control over the US House of Representatives after the 1792 elections, thanks in part to one of the top Federalists, James Madison, uniting with moderate Jefferson and prominent Anti-Federalists to form the Democratic Republican Party, as Madison became an opposer to Secretary of Treasury Alexander Hamilton's First Bank of the United States. In 1794, however, the Democratic Republican Party lost control of the United States Senate, thanks in part to the party's opposition to Jay's Treaty. In 1796, the Democratic Republican Party would also lose control of the United States House of Representatives, due to the party's support of the unpopular French Revolution, though the Democratic Republican Party still could obtain second place victories in these elections- which made Jefferson the US Vice President- as well; Washington, however, was supported by almost every American, and even though he ran under the Federalist ticket, he still was not an official Federalist and was easily re-elected U.S. president unanimously in 1792 as well, and John Adams- an actual Federalist who was also elected United States President in 1796- was elected vice president (president of the Senate) on the Federalist ticket with Washington as well.

=== Early 19th century ===
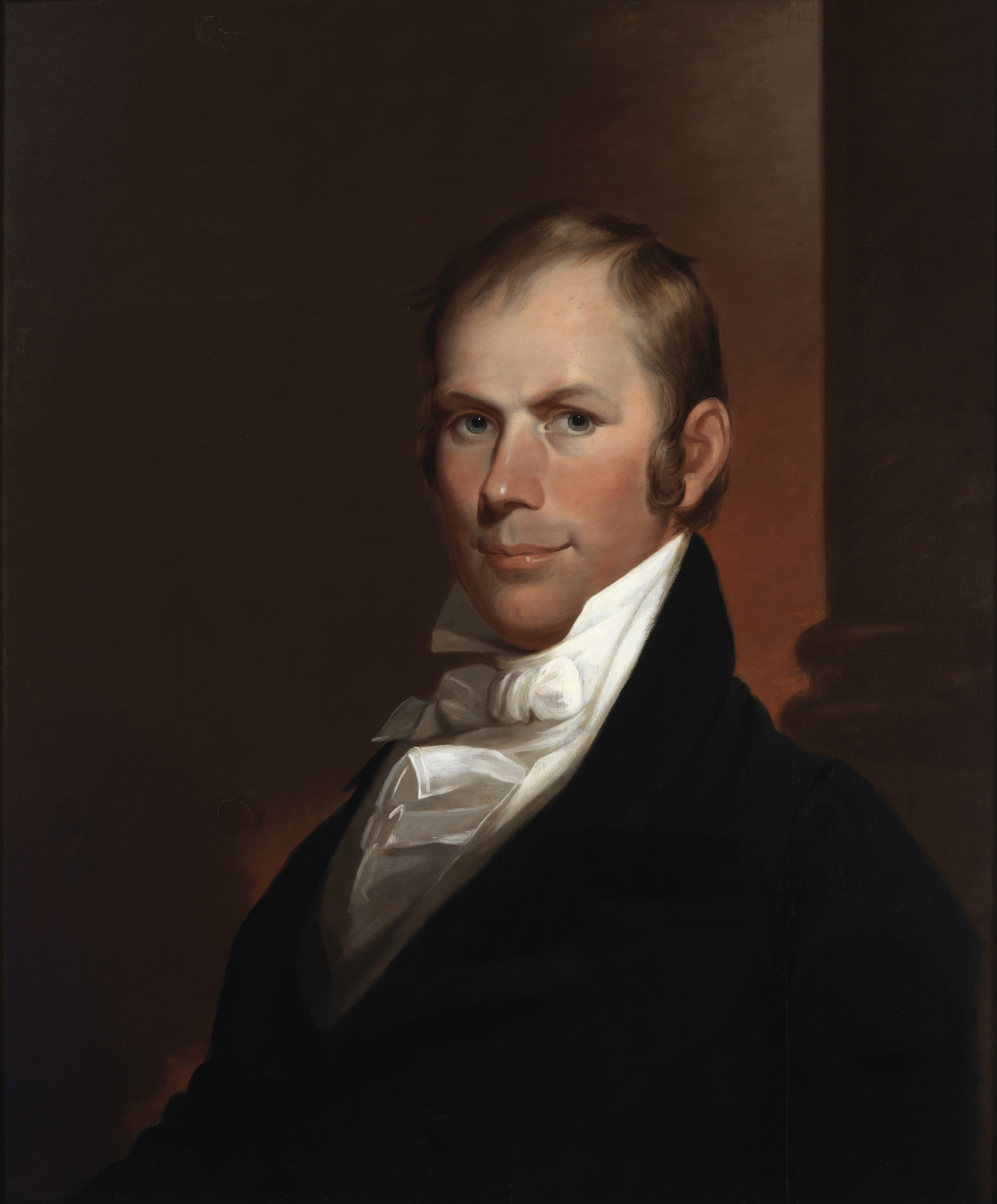
Henry Clay wielded great influence in the early Congress.

The early 19th century was marked by frequent clashes between the House of Representatives and the Senate. After victory in the 1800 US elections, Jefferson's Democratic-Republican Party dominated both the US Senate and US House of Representatives, as well as the presidential elections; this was because states' rights became a popular issue after the Virginia and Kentucky Resolutions protested against the Federalists Alien and Sedition Acts.

Federalists, after having lost the presidency and Congress, had a stronghold in the Supreme Court, presided over by chief justice John Marshall. One highly partisan justice, Samuel Chase, had irked president Jefferson by highly charged partisan attacks on his character, calling him a "Jacobin". Jefferson, after becoming president, urged Congress to impeach Chase. The House initiated impeachment in 1804, and the Senate tried but acquitted him, partially on the realization that while Chase's actions had been reprehensible, it was more important to preserve an independent judiciary. The congressional action had the effect of chastening the Supreme Court whose members, from that point on, generally, refrained from open character attacks on members of Congress and the president, and limited their criticisms to the judicial aspects of congressional and presidential decisions. Chase was the only Supreme Court justice impeached by Congress.

Henry Clay of Kentucky was the speaker of the US House of Representatives, and dominant leader over Congress, during the 1810s. A careful numerical balance between the free North and the slave holding South existed in the Senate, as the numbers of free and slave states was kept equal by a series of compromises, such as the Missouri Compromise of 1820. That broke down in 1850 when California was admitted as a free state, but the Compromise of 1850 postponed a showdown. Meanwhile, the North was growing faster and dominated the House of Representatives, despite the rule that counted 3/5 of non-voting slaves in the population base of the South.

== Partisan era (1830s–1900s) ==
=== 1820s and beyond ===
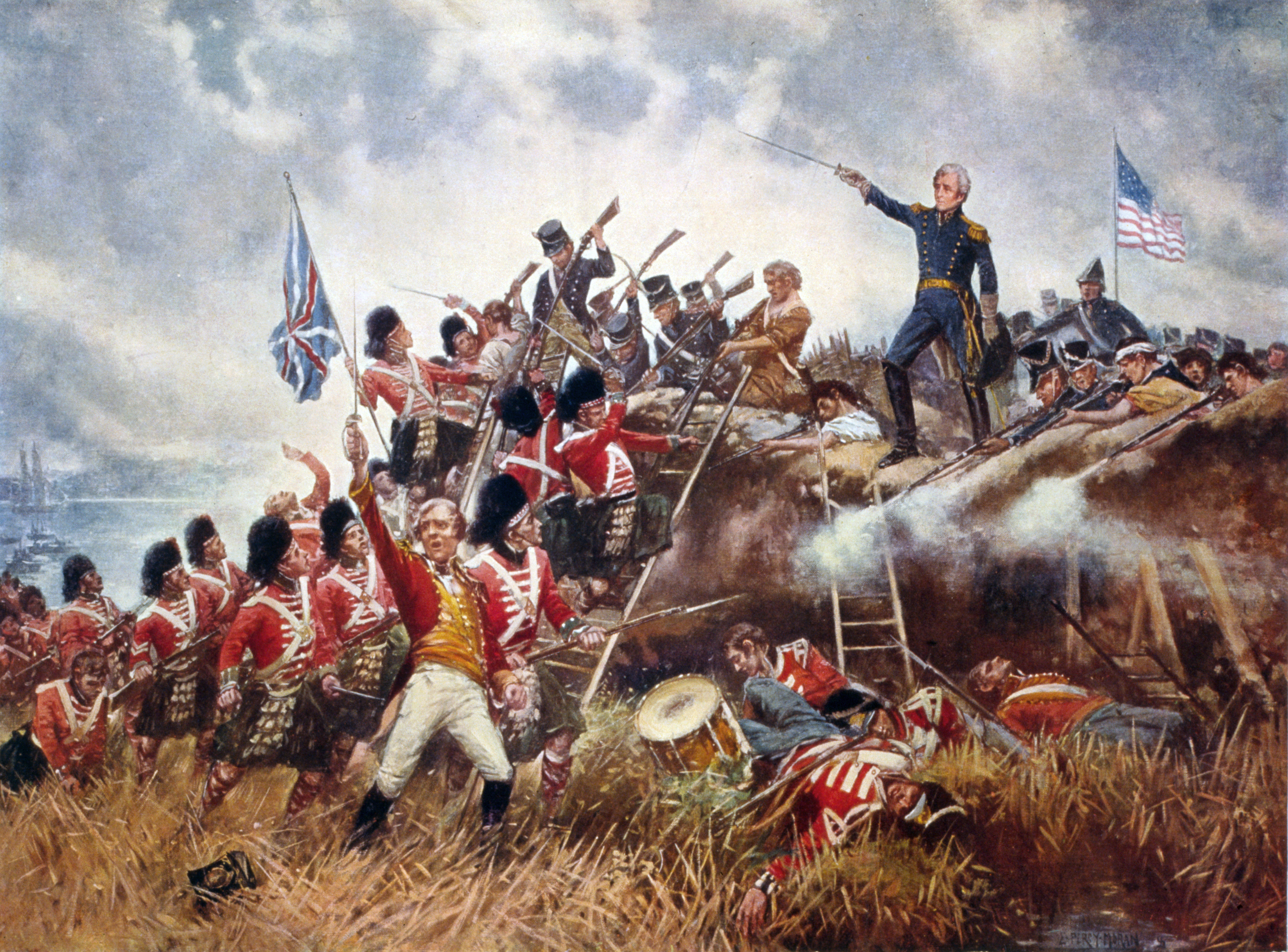
The decisive defeat of the British by forces led by General Jackson made the warrior an American hero.

The victory of John Quincy Adams in 1824 was challenged by Andrew Jackson, who argued a corrupt bargain between Clay and Adams had cheated Jackson; Jackson led both electoral votes and popular votes, but had no majority in the electoral college. Clay strongly opposed Jackson's "total war" policy (Jackson's unauthorized invasion of the Spanish colony of Florida was criticized in Congress––Jackson was the victorious general of the Battle of New Orleans). Clay gave his votes in the House of Representatives to the candidate who was closest to Jackson in terms of both electoral votes and popular votes, namely, John Quincy Adams. Jackson and his (as yet unnamed) followers easily dominated the 1826 congressional election and took complete control of the 20th United States Congress. As the Second Party System emerged, the Whigs and Jacksonians (called "Democrats" by 1834) battled for control of Congress. In the 1832 Senate elections, the National Republican party, which was the main party that opposed Andrew Jackson, gained control of the US Senate after President Jackson broke with his Vice-president John Calhoun, and gained Senate seats in parts of the Southern US, and maintained control over Senate until 1835, when Jackson's popular bank policies could help the Democrats regain control of Congress again in the 1834 congressional elections; this break between Jackson and Calhoun was over whether or not South Carolina could avoid the Tariff of 1828, which Calhoun strongly opposed, and resulted in Calhoun's new Nullifier Party eventually uniting with Henry Clay's National Republican Party, and other opponents of Andrew Jackson, to form the US Whig Party in 1834.

The Whigs swept into power in 1840, thanks in later part to the fact that President Martin Van Buren became unpopular after he continued to fail at bringing the US out of the depression started by the Panic of 1837; Van Buren would even lose in his home state of New York. Following the death of President William Henry Harrison in 1841, John Tyler became president and soon broke bitterly with Clay, and the Whigs in Congress, after he continuously vetoed Clay and the Whig Party's bills for a national banking act in 1841. As a result, Tyler's supporters helped give the Democrats control of the United States House of Representatives in the 1842 congressional elections.

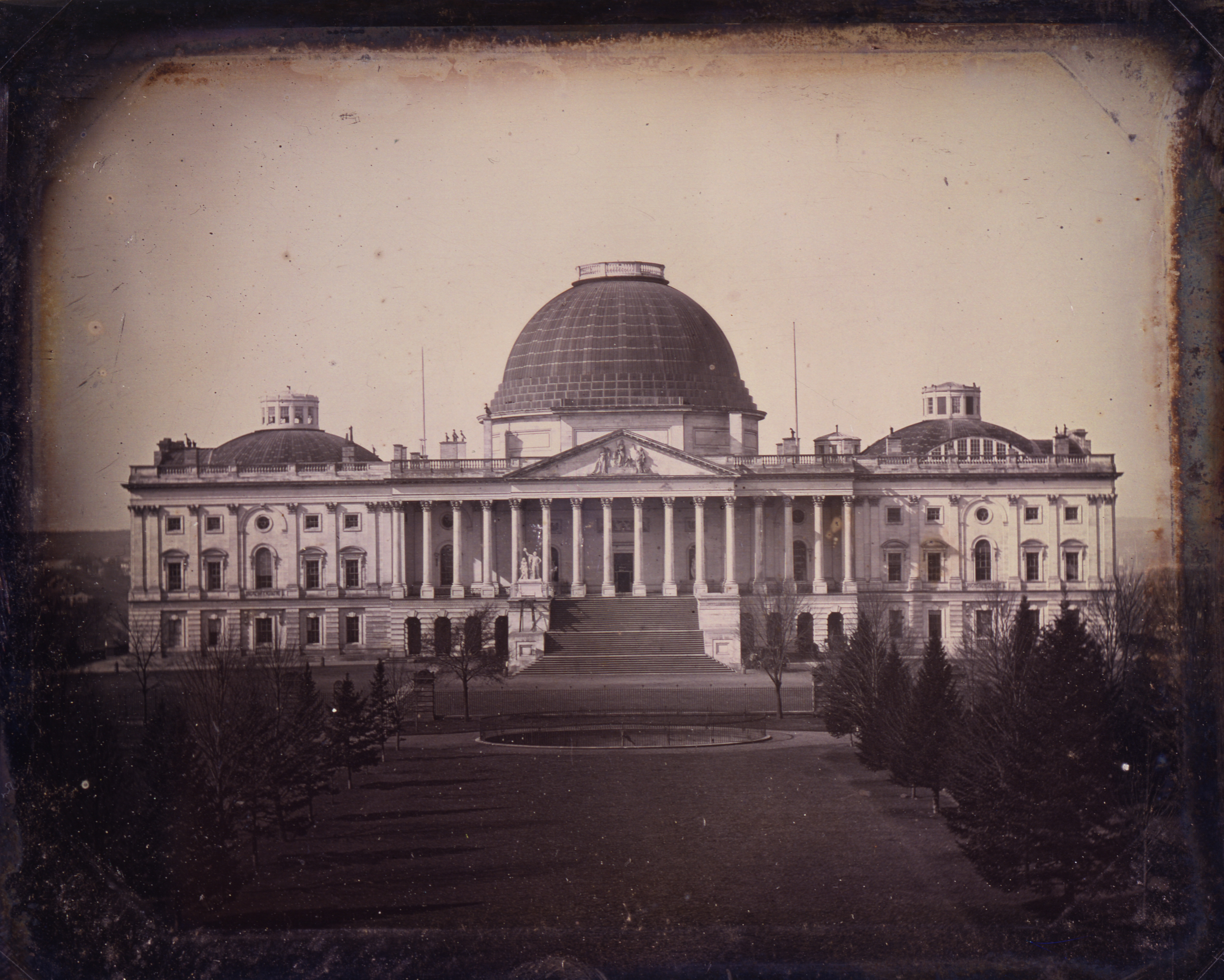
The Capitol in 1841

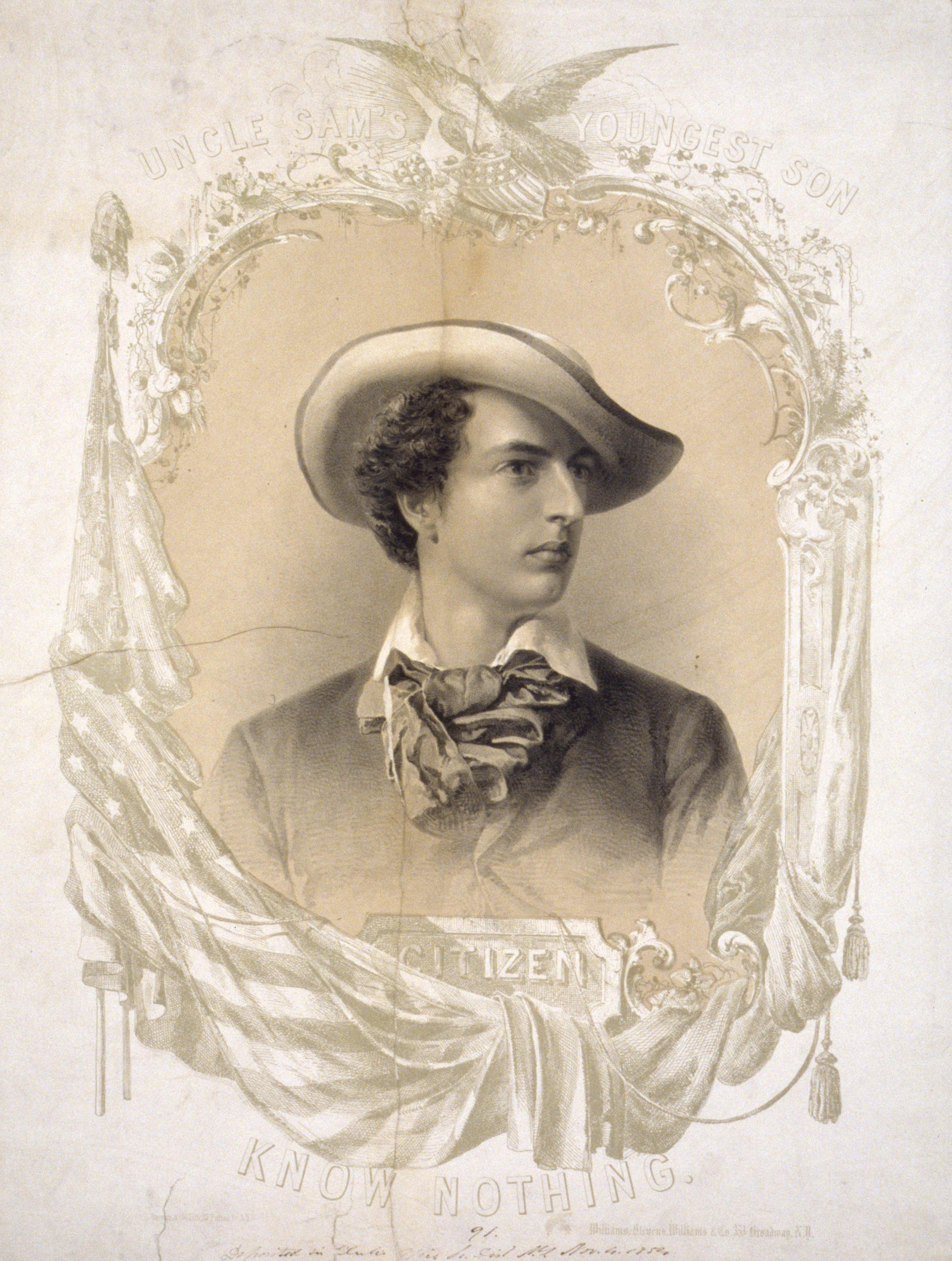
Uncle Sam's youngest son, Citizen Know Nothing. A bust portrait of a young man representing the nativist ideal of the Know Nothing party.

Democrats regained control of Congress in the 1844 elections, as well, thanks to the huge support of the annexation of Texas, as the 29th United States Congress, but the Whigs were back in control of both houses in 1846, thanks in part to the opposition of the Mexican–American War. The Democrats were able to regain control of Congress in 1848, thanks in part to the U.S. winning the Mexican–American War. The Democrats now had complete control over the 31st United States Congress, despite the break between the anti-slavery (Free Soil Party) and pro slavery Democrats; because of this break, the Democrats would not maintain the U.S. presidency, and Whig Party member Zachary Taylor was elected the 12th president of the United States in the 1848 U.S. presidential election. In 1852, the divide between the pro-slavery southern Wings (who threw their support to Democratic candidate Franklin Pierce and broke with Henry Clay over the Compromise of 1850) and the anti-slavery Northern (who stood behind Clay's compromise and supported the party's nominee Winfield Scott) would also help give the Democrats not only control both houses of Congress, but also the US presidency as well. In the 1854 elections, the Kansas-Nebraska Act, sponsored by Senator Stephen Douglas, was put against vehement opposition. The opposition to this act led to the formation of the new Republican party. In early 1856, the Know Nothing Party assembled nativists and former Whigs but the Democrats regained control over Congress. During this time the Know Nothing Party and Republican Party united and together, elected Know Nothing Congressman Nathaniel Prentice Banks, as to serve as the speaker of the House of Representatives for the remaining years of the 34th United States Congress.

Through the 35th United States Congress, the Democrats regained control of both houses in Congress; this thanks in part to the division of the Know-Nothing Party and the Republican Party during the 1856 U.S. presidential election. The Know Nothings soon collapsed, and in the North were absorbed by the Republicans, who dominated most states and took control of the U.S. House of Representatives in the 1858 elections, as abolitionist Know Nothings joined the Republican Party after the controversial Dred Scott ruling occurred in 1857. In 1860, Abraham Lincoln led the Republicans to a victory based entirely in the anti-slavery North, and the Republican Party now took full control of Congress.

=== Civil War and aftermath ===
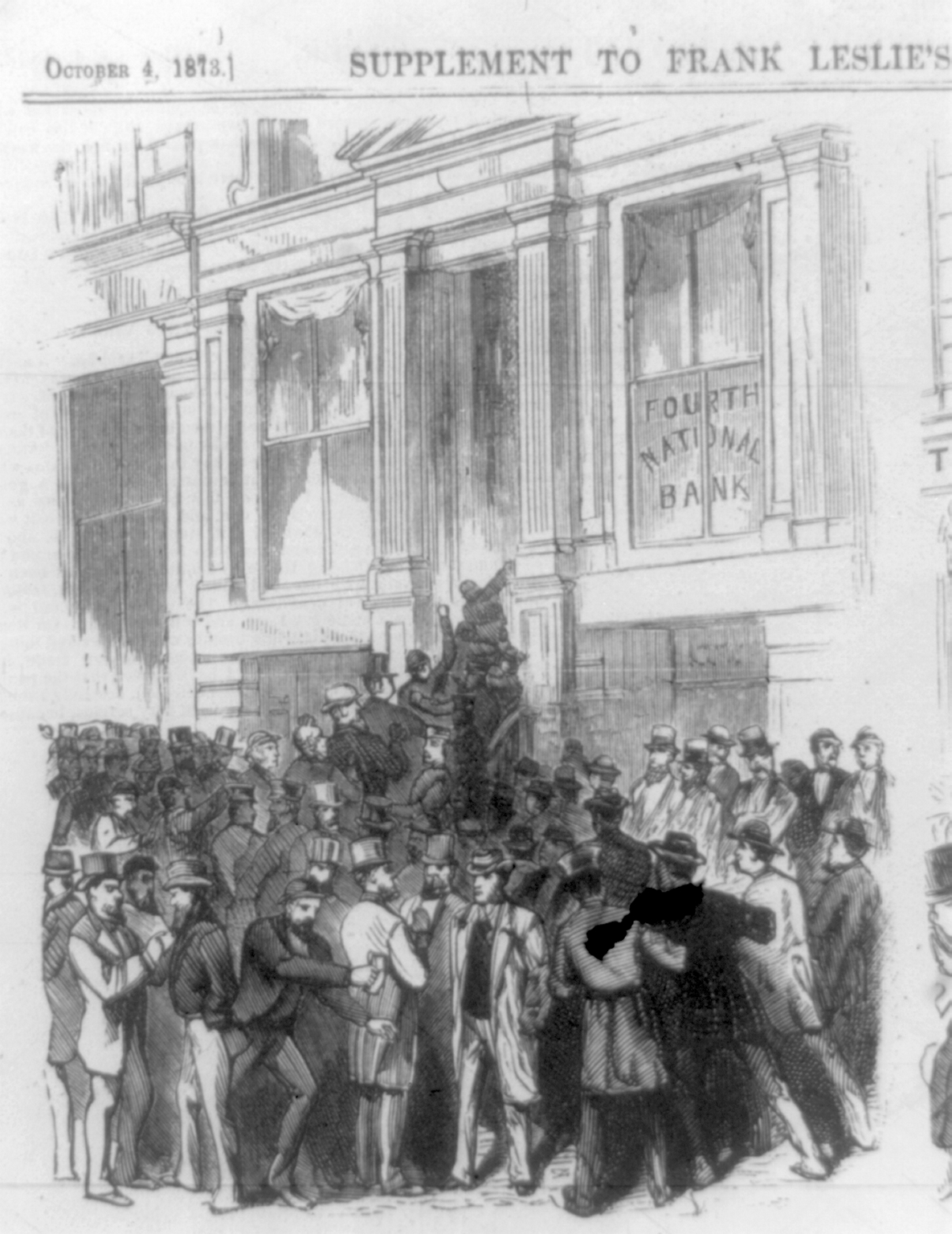
Investors in 1873 clamber up the Fourth National Bank No. 20 Nassau Street hoping to get their money back.

Congress played a major role in the American Civil War, as the Republicans were in control of both chambers; after the war ended in 1865, Reconstruction was controlled by President Andrew Johnson, who broke with the Radical Republicans (led by Congressman Thaddeus Stevens and Senator Charles Sumner.) After the elections of 1866 the Radicals came to power, impeached (but did not convict) President Johnson, and controlled Reconstruction policy. The Radical hold was broken by the Democratic landslide victories in the election of 1874, and Democrats regained control of the US House of Representatives, this was thanks in part to the Long Depression started by the Panic of 1873. The Democrats would continue to dominate the US House of Representatives, and even gained control of the US Senate in the 1878 US Senate election as the depression worsened.

The Gilded Age (1877–1901) was marked by Republican dominance of Congress—and the Presidency— except in the early years, and some of the mid-years of the Gilded Age-, despite the Democratic lock on the Solid South. The Republican Party, however, would regain control over the US House of Representatives in the 1880 election, as support for the Republican Party's tariff spread among the general public; the Panic of 1873 had also ended for the US in 1879, with the start of the vast immigration into the US that lasted until 1930. State legislatures continued to elect senators, which meant that the most powerful politicians in the state vied for control of the legislature in order to win election to the Senate. The Democrats, however, retained control of the United States Senate in the 1880 US Senate election, as Virginia's Readjuster Party member William Mahone and Illinois' Independent Party member David Davis were both elected to the US Senate. Both men chose to caucus with the Democrats, thus giving the Democratic Party a 39–37 control of the Senate during the 47th United States Congress.

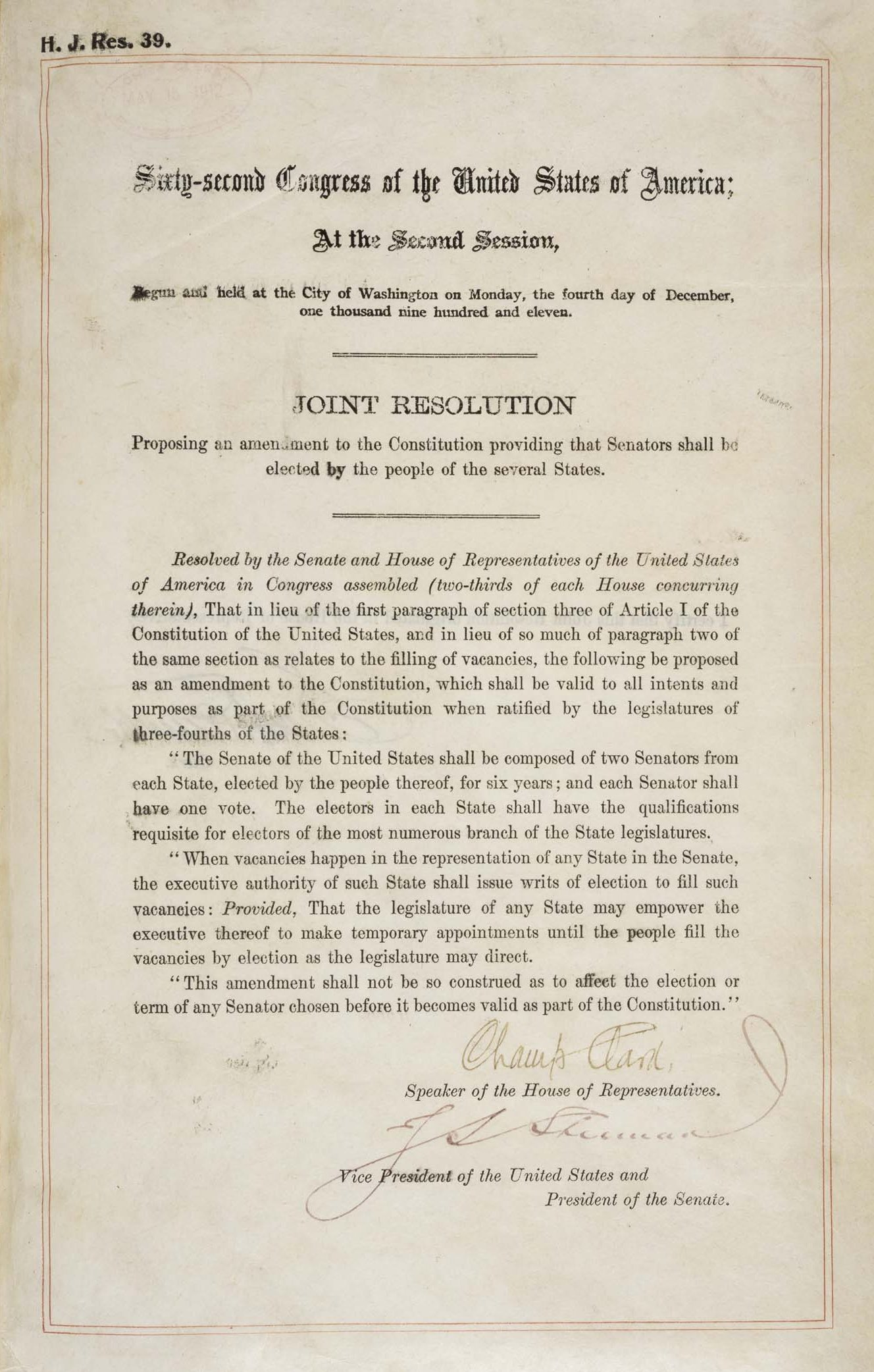
The Seventeenth Amendment

With support for the Republican Party now had for rebounding the United States economy with the tariff of the party's US President James Garfield (who was assassinated in late 1881), the Republicans would see themselves take back control over the US Senate in the 1882 US Senate elections. While the Republican Party was now in control of both houses of Congress once again, it wouldn't last for long at all. President Arthur became unpopular within after turning on Roscoe Conkling and the Stalwarts and supported civil reform. In some cases, Senate elections were tainted by corruption and bribery. In other instances, gridlock between the two houses of state legislatures prevented the election of a senator. (In one acute case, deadlock prevented the Delaware legislature from sending a senator to Washington for four years.) These issues were resolved by the Seventeenth Amendment (ratified in 1913), which provided for the direct popular election of senators. With former speaker of the House of Representatives James Blaine (who served as the Republican Party's nominee during the 1884 US presidential election) tainted by the Mulligan Letters, the Republicans would lose control of the US House of Representatives, as well as the presidency, in 1884.

In 1888, New York's support for the Republican Party's tariff policies helped Republicans retake control over the US House of Representatives once again, through the state of New York. The Democrats were able to regain control over the US House of Representatives after the Republican Party lost support after President Benjamin Harrison continued to spend money from the US Treasury to try to help American businesses that were suffering from the high US tariffs, in the 1890 elections, as well as also regaining the Presidency and US Senate in 1892, as opposition to President Harrison's tariffs grew. The Republicans however would regain control over Congress in the 1894 congressional election; after President Cleveland and the Democrats continued to fail at bringing the US out of the depression started by the Panic of 1893; William McKinley also being elected US president in 1896 brought the US out of the depression started by the Panic of 1893, through his support of both big businesses and high tariffs, and officially began the Progressive Era.

== Committee era (1910s–1960s) ==
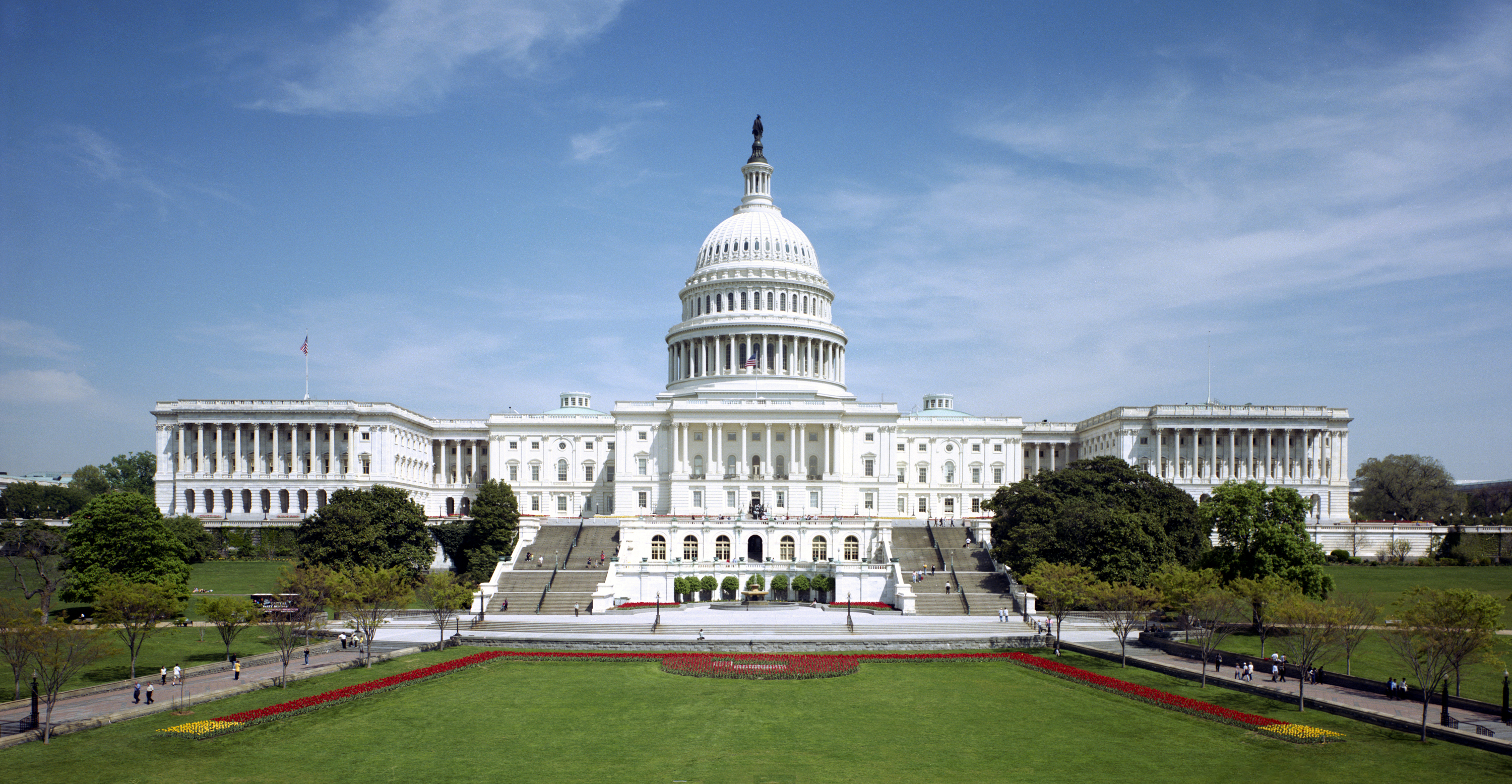
The United States Capitol

=== Progressive Era ===
The Progressive Era (1896–1932) witnessed the rise of strong party leadership in both houses of Congress. In the House of Representatives, the office of Speaker became extremely powerful under Thomas Reed in 1890, reaching its zenith under the Republican Joseph Gurney Cannon. The Senate was controlled by a half dozen men, including Republicans Nelson Aldrich and Mark Hanna. A revolt against Speaker Cannon in 1910, led by George Norris, strengthened the seniority system and made long-serving Congressmen more independent of party. Committee chairmen remained particularly strong in both houses until the reforms of the 1970s.

In 1901, President William McKinley was assassinated and his vice president, Theodore Roosevelt, succeeded him. As president, Roosevelt changed the Republicans image to be more progressive than pro-business. During his presidency, which lasted between the years 1901 and 1909, Roosevelt became arguably the strongest leader of the entire Progressive Era. However, Roosevelt's successor, William Howard Taft, did not continue Roosevelt's progressive policies, and this resulted in a major break between the conservative (pro-Taft) and progressive (pro-Roosevelt) Republicans. In the 1910 midterm elections, the Democrats would regain control over the US House of Representatives once again, after the Panic of 1910–11 further shattered these uneasy relations between the conservative and progressive Republicans.

=== Structural changes ===
There were two important structural changes to Congress around the turn of the 20th century:

- Direct election of senators. Senators were chosen not by state governments but by direct election, according to the Seventeenth Amendment. Author David Kyvig saw this as a positive development since "senators became much more sensitive to public opinion in their state", but advocates of states rights saw direct election of senators as undermining the authority of state governments within the national government and harming the principle of federalism. Congress has also been criticized for siding with the Supreme Court to undermine the ability of state governments to regulate their respective economies; critics see a pattern of interpreting congressional power "expansively" according to such cases as Wickard v. Filburn (1942) and Gonzales v. Raich (2005). However, in two cases, United States v. Lopez (1995) and United States v. Morrison (2000), the Supreme Court rejected arguments that the commerce clause allowed Congress to "regulate noneconomic activities merely because, through a chain of causal effects, they might have an economic impact". The effect of the change to popular election of senators was to reduce the difference between the House and Senate in terms of their link to the electorate.
- Lame duck reforms. The Twentieth Amendment was a positive reform which ended the power of lame-duck congresspersons who were defeated or retiring members who remained in office for a while despite their lack of accountability to the public.

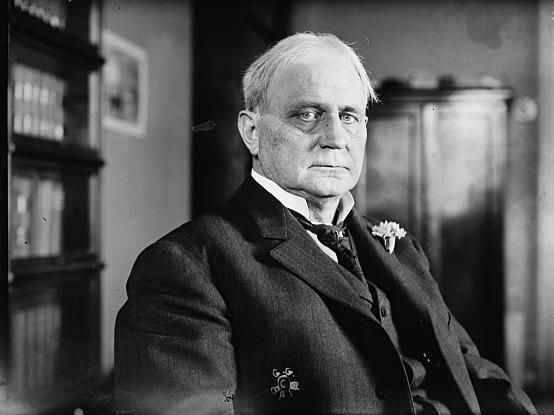
Champ Clark in 1912

The break between the conservative and progressive Republicans in the 1912 US Presidential Election also greatly helped the Democrats regain the presidency and complete control over Congress; even after the Republican Party reunited in the 1914 congressional elections, the Republican Party could not regain control of Congress, thanks to the strong popularity Wilson had obtained with his New Freedom policy. However, President Wilson's failure to protect the neutral rights of the American people helped the Republicans obtain more seats in the US House of Representatives than the Democrats in the 1916 election; however, Wilson was able to maintain his presidency after he won in the state of California for his opposition to the US entering the Great War. Despite this, Democratic Speaker of the House of Representatives Champ Clark maintained his position, after the some of Progressive Party members of the US House of Representatives agreed to caucus with the Democrats; Clark would maintain his position as United States Speaker of the House until 1919. By the 1918 congressional elections, many American men were overseas fighting in the Great War (later known as World War I), and with the American voting public wanting the war- which the US entered under Democratic US President Woodrow Wilson- to end, the Republicans, whom former US President Theodore Roosevelt had now strongly backed, easily managed to regain control of the US Senate in this election, as well as control of the US Congress, as the Democratic Party's popularity decreased because of President Wilson's war efforts.

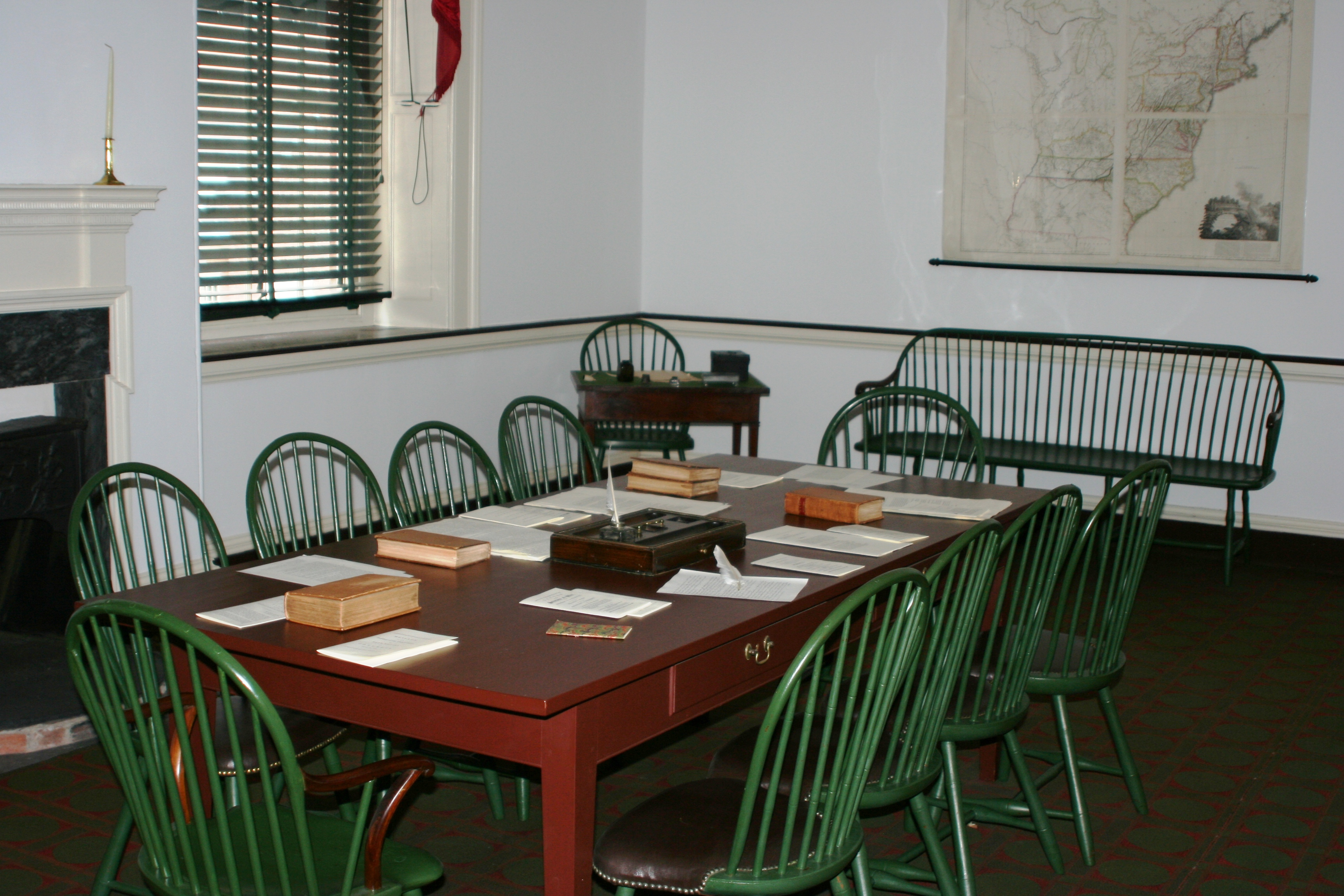
This era of Congress was dubbed the committee era and lasted approximately from the 1910s until the 1970s; much work was done in committees around tables like this one.

Following the end of the war, the Wilson administration was plagued with numerous problems such as: 1) the large support against President Wilson's support for US membership into the League of Nations (which was regarded by the American public as an organization that could have introduced a German-American relationship)-; 2) the massive Steel Strike of 1919 3) race riots, and 4) the growing support among the American public, who now feared Communists would infiltrate the country, to reduce immigration. As a result, the Republican party would obtain a firmer majority control of both congressional houses, in the 1920 congressional election, and score a heavy win the 1920 US Presidential Election as well; Republican presidential candidate Warren Harding, a pro-laissez faire conservative, would also receive a record-breaking percent of the popular vote as well. However, the Harding administration could not bring the economy back to normal. Although the Republicans were able to retain control of both houses of Congress, the conservative Republicans (whom Harding backed) would suffer major losses.

In 1923, Harding, now tainted further by scandals, died and his vice-president, Calvin Coolidge, became president. Under Coolidge, the economy revived and the conservatives regained control of US Congress in 1924 In general, the Republicans retained control of Congress until 1931, after 19 Republicans in the US House of Representatives died and Democrats took their places in the special elections- after Republican President Herbert Hoover had continuously failed to get the US out of the Great Depression.

=== Great Depression ===
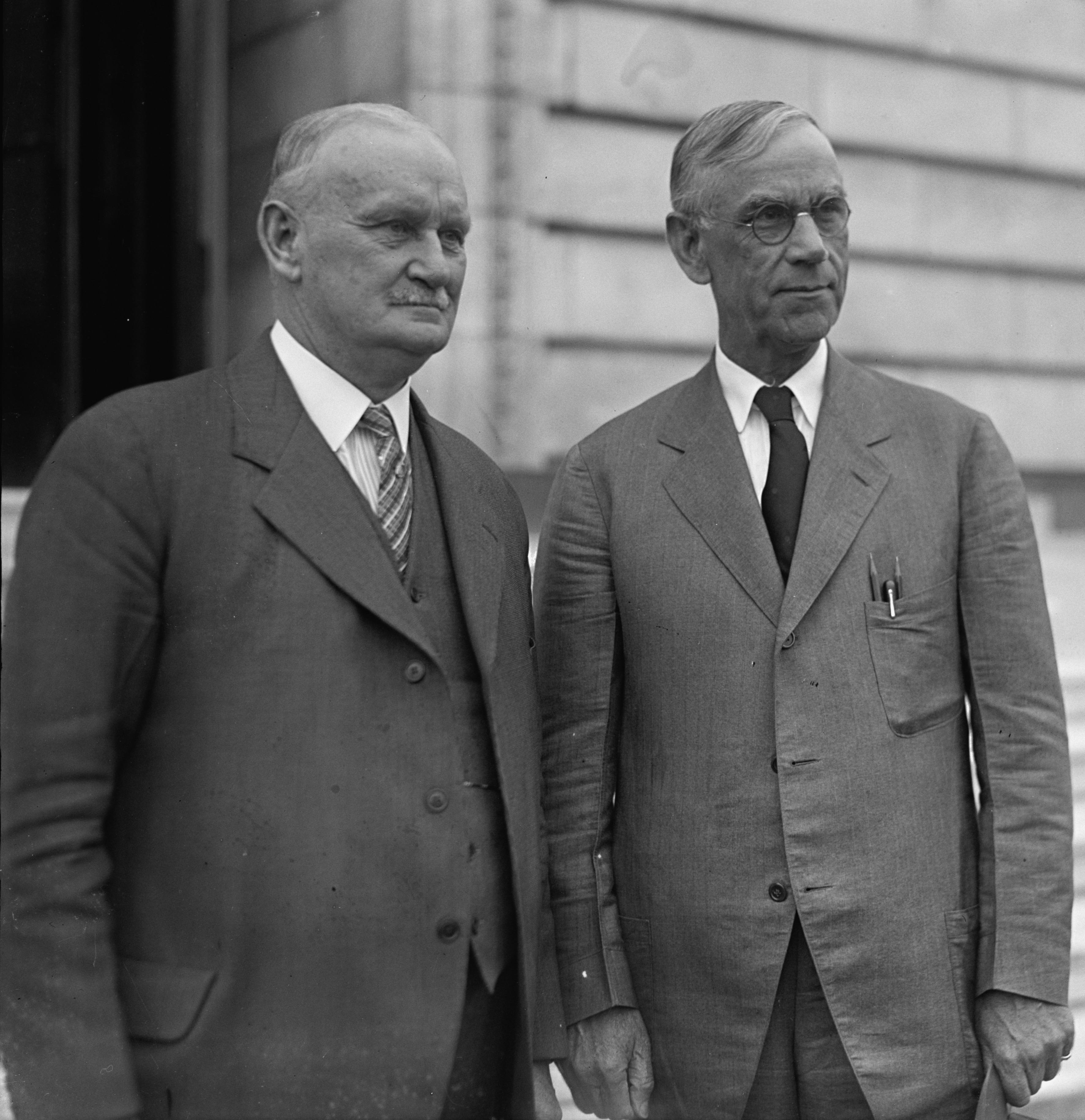
Willis C. Hawley (left) and Reed Smoot meeting shortly after the signing of the Smoot-Hawley Tariff Act in 1929

On October 29, 1929, a day known in history as Black Tuesday, the New York Stock Exchange experienced a significant crash and the United States, as well as most of the world, would enter a major recession. In response, President Herbert Hoover and the Republican Congress passed the Smoot Hawley Tariff Act. However, it has been recognized that this act only made economic condition far worse. The 1930 midterm election saw the Republicans barely maintain control of the US House of Representatives and US Senate. Shortly after the 1930 midterm election, however, special elections were held to replace 19 House of Representative-elects who died, and Democrats would gain a four-seat majority in the US House of Representatives as a result of the outcome of these elections. In the 1932 US Senate elections, the Democrats easily regained control over the US Senate once again; this 1932 election also saw Franklin Roosevelt get elected US president as well, and Roosevelt could now begin his historic New Deal policies through the Democrat-dominated US Congress, and could bring the US out of the Great Depression for four years.

Franklin D. Roosevelt's election as president in 1932 marked a shift in power towards the presidency. Numerous New Deal initiatives were proposed from the White House and sent to Congress for approval, rather than legislation originating in Congress. During the long administration of President Franklin D. Roosevelt (1933 to 1945), the Democratic Party controlled both houses of Congress. As a result, the Democrats obtained 60 of the 96 existing Senate seats and 318 of the existing 435 House seats; hence the party now controlled two-thirds of Congress. The Democrats would continue to maintain this two-thirds control for the next six years. While the Democrats still managed to maintain control of Congress after the 1938 elections, the Republicans––taking advantage of the Recession of 1937––were able to gain 81 seats in the House of Representatives and 6 seats in the Senate after the election, making it difficult for the Democrats to continue expanding New Deal programs. Despite the Republican gains, the 1938 elections maintained a 72% Democratic majority in the Senate and a 60% Democratic majority in the House. Since the filibuster rule applies only in the Senate, Democrats maintained a filibuster-proof majority after the 1938 elections despite having lost 6 seats. Republicans gained the psychological satisfaction of making a credible comeback––from oblivion––in the 1938 elections, but the Democrats maintained solid numbers. During this time, Republicans and conservative Democrats from the South (who were backed by Vice President John Nance Garner) formed a unity known as the Conservative Coalition and were able to reduce the two-thirds majority of New Dealers on the United States House Committee on Rules; hence the two-thirds "rule-change" requirement was erased for the New Dealers. The 1938 congressional election also saw the reduction of New Dealers on United States House Committee on Ways and Means as well.

In 1940, however, the pro-Roosevelt northern Democrats were able to regain firm control of Congress once again. In 1942, after the United States entered World War II and voter turnout significantly decreased, Democrats maintained control of both houses of Congress, but the Republicans were able to make significant gains in the congressional election; hence, the conservatives won the election and were able to gain control of both houses of Congress. Despite this, Democratic Speaker of the House Sam Rayburn and Senate majority leader Alben Barkley, both allies of Roosevelt, were able to maintain their positions. By the 1944 congressional elections, Roosevelt had been glorified as a heroic wartime leader, and as a result, he was elected to a fourth term and the pro-Roosevelt Democrats would once more regain control of both the United States House of Representatives and the United States Senate

=== Postwar era ===
Congress struggled with efficiency in the postwar era. In 1945, two members led an effort to trim the number of congressional committees from 81 to 34 and required lobbyists to register.

In the 1946 U.S. congressional election, the Republicans regained control of both the US Senate and US House of Representatives, as a result of President Truman failing to handle the vast post-war labor strikes. The Democrats were able to retake control of Congress in 1948, thanks to the widespread support Democratic President Harry Truman gained from rural communities after he pledged to repeal the Taft–Hartley Act; with this victory, the conservative coalition was also defeated and the liberal Democrats regained control of Congress. The week prior the 1950 midterm elections, China had agreed to provide combat assistance to North Korea throughout the remainder of the Korean War and the American public became more dissatisfied with Truman's war policy; the Conservative Coalition (now led by Republican Senator Robert A. Taft) regained control of the Senate. This victory would give the Southern Democrats control of 13 of 19 congressional committees and Democratic Senator Ernest McFarland, a conservative who opposed Truman's Fair Deal, became the Senate Majority Leader. In 1952, Republican candidate, and decorated World War II general, Dwight Eisenhower was elected president by a landslide vote, as people thought Truman was too soft on Communism and unable to end the Korean War. With his victory, Eisenhower was able to give the Republican Party control of both houses of Congress as well. With Republican Eisenhower's election to the presidency in 1952, Republicans again won both houses.

After the 1954 congressional elections, the Democratic Party now dominated both houses of Congress until 1994 The Democrats regained control of Congress in 1954, as a result of the high rate of unemployment that had now spread throughout the United States and high disapproval of Republican US Senator Joseph McCarthy. While the Conservative Coalition was still able to maintain the most seats in Congress, liberal Democratic Congressman Sam Rayburn regained his position as Speaker of the House and liberal Democratic US Senator Lyndon Johnson became the Senate Majority leader. Two years later, however, President Eisenhower would again score another huge victory in the 1956 US Presidential Election, thanks in part to the support he received from a large number of Americans for condemning the Suez Canal seizure (which, in turn, prevented an escalation in tensions with the Soviet Union), and supporting both the Hungarian Revolution and Brown v. Board of Education of Topeka ruling. Despite this huge victory, Eisenhower could not give the Republican Party control of Congress again; however, the conservative coalition still maintained a congressional majority. In 1958, after the United States entered a recession, the Conservative Coalition lost control of Congress. This election would give the liberal Democrats a filibuster-proof majority in the US Senate as well. In 1960, Democratic candidate John F. Kennedy won the US presidential election by a narrow margin, and the balance of power shifted to the Democrats. Between the years 1961 and 1969, the Democrats (through US Presidents John Kennedy and Lyndon Johnson) maintained their majority.

In 1964, with the success of President Johnson's Great Society policies, the Democrats regained enough seats in Congress to secure a two-thirds, veto-proof majority once again; this victory would severely cripple the Conservative Coalition as well. Afterwards, the Republicans agreed to take a less conservative platform and become more moderate. The nation was becoming huge, complex, multi-faceted, and required additional efforts to try to streamline Congress; in 1965, a senator discussed how issues such as space and atomic energy were overshadowing less complex matters such as which towns got new post offices, and demanded the institution change with the times. 1966 saw the Republicans erase the two-thirds veto-proof majority after minor inflation occurred nationwide from the Great Society policies. By 1968, Johnson's continuation of the Vietnam War had become highly unpopular nationwide. As a result, Republican presidential candidate Richard Nixon, who promised to reform Johnson's war policy, was elected US President (in yet another closely contested election) and the Democrats lost their ten-year filibuster-proof majority in the United States Senate. Despite this, however, the Democrats were still able to maintain a wide majority of the seats in the US House of Representatives. and the US Senate.

== Contemporary era (1970s–today) ==
The Democrats continued to hold a fair majority after the 1970 congressional elections as well, despite Republican gains. In 1972, Richard Nixon also set an electoral college record, by winning 49 states, after he gained popularity by: 1) establishing diplomacy with China; 2) organizing the SALT arms treaty with the Soviet Union; and 3) convincing the public that the Vietnam War was about over. Despite this, the Democrats still maintained a majority of seats in Congress.

=== Return of partisanship ===
Generally the next fifty years were marked by slim majorities in Congress, which some thinkers believe has led to more intense partisanship, and reflects a decline in an era when lawmakers from both sides of the aisle met in friendly discussions in an informally dubbed ground floor room in the Capitol called the Board of Education. It was a place where lawmakers found ways to discuss, deal, compromise, and agree on national problems in a bipartisan fashion. Since the mid nineteen fifties, Congress has been marked by increasing partisanship in which congresspersons voted increasingly in line with their party, and were reluctant to cross the aisle to find compromises, and academics disagree about what factors underlie this trend towards greater partisanship and whether it is continuing.

=== Watergate and its wake ===
Nixon's political career was greatly damaged by the Watergate Scandal. On August 9, 1974, he became the first US president to resign from public office. By the time the 1974 congressional elections took place, Gerald Ford's popularity was severely damaged after he pardoned Nixon and could not get the U.S. economy out of an ongoing recession. Watergate reshaped the relations between Congress and the other branches, and led to increased congressional oversight of federal intelligence agencies, the War Powers Resolution, campaign finance reform, and independent counsel investigations of malfeasance in the executive branch by Congress.

After the Watergate scandal and other abuses of power by the Richard Nixon administration, Congress began to reassert its power to oversee the executive branch and develop legislation. The Democrats regained a two-thirds majority as well as a filibuster-proof Senate majority over Congress once again. In 1978, the Republicans erased the Democrats filibuster-proof, as well a two-thirds, majority by scoring a huge victory in the 1978 congressional election, as a result of heavy inflation that spread throughout the country at the time. The Democrats' majority in the Senate was now 59–41 and the majority over the House was 276–159. In 1980, The Republicans won both majority of the US Senate and the 1980 US Presidential Election; Republican Ronald Reagan became US president and Howard Baker, a moderate-conservative Republican US Senator from Tennessee, became the new Senate Majority leader.

=== Growth of lobbying ===
The 1971 Federal Election Campaign Act established the Federal Election Commission which imposed restrictions on monetary contributions by individuals, parties, and political action committees (PACs) could make to candidates for Congress, although there were serious loopholes which encouraged the rapid growth of PACs as well as so-called soft money contributions. Soft money could be used to fund causes not tied to specific candidates, but which could be used to fund political parties, staff, office expenses, television ads; they were not directed by a congressional candidate but could benefit him or her substantially nevertheless. Later, the 2002 McCain–Feingold campaign finance reform law limited campaign donations for broadcast TV and radio ads, but didn't limit soft money contributions from corporations, unions and wealthy individuals. One source suggests post-Watergate laws amended in 1974 meant to reduce the "influence of wealthy contributors and end payoffs" instead "legitimized PACs" since they "enabled individuals to band together in support of candidates". From 1974 to 1984, the number of PACs grew from 608 to 3,803, and PAC donations leaped from $12.5 million to $120 million.

=== Reagan years ===
Reagan, however, had failed to get the country out of the continued recession. Starting in 1980 and again after the 1982 midterm elections, President Reagan worked with a split Congress with a Republican majority after the 1980 Senate elections and a Democratic majority after the 1980 House elections. The conservatives (whom Reagan backed) lost a substantial number of seats in Congress in 1982. By early 1983, however, the recession had ended and Reagan was re-elected president, in 1984, with a record-breaking 525 electoral votes. The Republicans' six-year control over the Senate ended in 1986, after numerous issues (the Iran Contra Affair, unpopular support for Reagan's aid to the Nicaragua Contras, the cost of the Star Wars weapons program, farming woes and trade gaps) damaged the Reagan Administration's image. By 1988, however, Reagan was redeemed of these scandals and Republican Vice President George H.W. Bush won the 1988 US presidential election by a landslide vote.

=== Clinton years ===
In the 1992 US presidential election, Democratic candidate Bill Clinton defeated President Bush (whose image was damaged by economic woes and the Republican base was split by third-party candidate Ross Perot) while the Democratic Party had a majority after both the Senate elections and Representatives elections of 1992. This shifted the balance of power in favor of the Democrats once again. The Republicans, however, finally returned to a majority position, in both houses of Congress, in the election of 1994, thanks in part to: 1) President Clinton's unpopular attempt to establish universal health care; and 2) Republican Congressman Newt Gingrich's Contract with America, which was promoted heavily by the entire Republican Party. By the 1996 US Presidential Election, Clinton's economic programs prevailed and the President was elected to a second term in a landslide victory. Despite Clinton's huge victory, however, the Democrats were still not able to regain control of either the US House of Representatives or Senate.

=== Rising influence of the media ===
In the last few decades, the role of the media has become more prominent, and analyst Michael Schudson suggested that "more actions took place in a public arena" and caused "more roads to open up in Congress for individual representatives to influence decisions". Political scientist Norman Ornstein notes that changes in the electronic and print media have led to a greater emphasis on the negative and sensational side of Congress, and refers to this as the tabloidization of media coverage. Other academics have pointed out that pressure to squeeze a political position into a thirty-second soundbite means that it's difficult to explain things which require a "heavy burden of proof". Complex decisions must be made simple enough to communicate with a quick slogan or catchphrase. As more Americans tended to stay home and watch television, the impact of television on politics continued to grow, so that advertising commercials for congresspersons running for reelection became vital.

=== Rise of right-wing conservatism ===
For the most part between 1995 and 2007, the Republicans controlled both houses. In the wake of the unpopularity of President Clinton's impeachment trial, the 107th Congress (2001–2003) saw the Democrats and Republicans split control of the US Senate 50–50, ending effectively tied; Despite this gain in the Senate for the Democrats, Republican George W Bush was elected president. His vice president Dick Cheney had the tie-breaking vote in the Senate during the first four months of 2001. In May 2001, a Republican US Senator from the state of Vermont, Jim Jeffords, ended his affiliation with the Republican Party, and caucused with the Democrats, giving them control of the Senate.

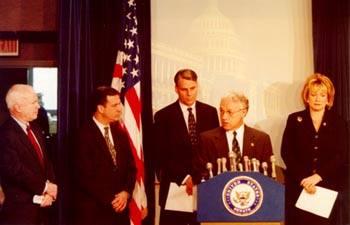
Congressman Jim Greenwood joins (left to right) Senators John McCain and Russ Feingold and Representatives Tim Roemer and Ellen Tauscher to endorse the McCain–Feingold campaign finance reform legislation

These years were marked by growth of lobbying, although there were efforts at reform. One analyst suggested the McCain–Feingold campaign finance reform law failed to rein in excessive campaign money. There have been concerns that PACs exert excessive influence over Congress and distort the democratic process. In 2009, there were 4,600 business, labor and special-interest PACs. Big PACs include the Association of Trial Lawyers of America, the International Brotherhood of Electrical Workers, and the National Association of Realtors. From 2007 to 2008, 175 members of Congress received "half or more of their campaign cash from political action committees in 2007–08". Both Republicans and Democrats get PAC money; for example, in 2007–2008, Republican Senator Mitch McConnell of Kentucky got $3,754,331 from PACs while Democratic Senator Max Baucus of Montana got $3,257,396. There were reports that some of the federal bailout money in the Troubled Asset Relief Program (TARP) for distressed banks during the economic downturn of 2007–2008 was being doled out as campaign contributions to lawmakers who oversee TARP. In 1988, Joseph A. Califano Jr. wrote "government regulation is more pervasive than ever" since the US economy is large and varied; and this encourages government officials to get "more and more involved in every aspect of our lives", which spurs special interests to use money to influence legislation. Some PAC members feel resentful of members of Congress yet "go along with their demands for contributions for fear of losing vital access in Congress". Critics of PACs say it allows special interests to wield too much influence in Congress; proponents dispute the assertion that PACs represent narrow constituencies. Bipartisan groups have tried to reduce the influence of PACs, generally unsuccessfully. But reform efforts have been stymied because of perceptions that changes may benefit one political party or the other. There is speculation that this money undermines the power of political parties since candidates could get resources directly from PACs rather than from the party. K Street Lobbyists (named because of the large number of lobbying firms located on K Street) are reported to have actually written portions of bills for both houses of Congress that later passed into law. A further complication is that lobbying groups have become skilled in "camouflaging their true identity" by forming coalitions with pleasant-sounding innocuous names.

=== 21st century and partisanship ===
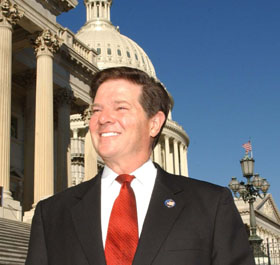
House Majority Leader Tom DeLay was dubbed The Hammer for his enforcement of party discipline and retribution against those who did not support the legislative agenda of President George W. Bush.

The Congress in the first decade of the 21st century has been characterized by sometimes rather extreme partisanship, with many votes split precisely on party lines. Some analysts wonder whether fierce political infighting between Democrats and Republicans has prevented lawmakers from tackling tough issues such as global warming and deficit spending and prevented them from finding acceptable bipartisan compromises on issues. In 2009, two former secretaries of State, one Republican, one Democrat, described America in 2009 as "riven with partisan bickering as we confront a range of serious threats – economic, political and military". Congress, itself, has tried to make rulings to reduce partisanship; for example, H.Res.153.LTH discussed how personal choices about ethics were made on a partisan basis. Intense partisanship combined with ethics probes can be a potent concoction; for example, representative Tom DeLay was kicked out of the House based in part on his dealings with lobbyist Jack Abramoff. DeLay complained afterwards in the Washington Post about what he called the criminalization of politics: "it's not bad enough now to just beat 'em in policy or let them ruin your reputation ... they've got to bankrupt you, ruin your family, put you in jail, put you in the grave and then dance on your grave", said DeLay. DeLay was subsequently convicted by a jury of money laundering and conspiracy related to illegally channeling campaign finances. He was sentenced to three years in prison for his crimes. At his sentencing, the judge dismissed any notion of partisanship as having been a factor in the trial: "Before there were Republicans and Democrats, there was America, and what America is about is the rule of law." Congress can still pass bills despite intense partisan opposition, such as the recent health care overhaul.

=== Congress today ===
The 117th Congress (2021-2022) saw the Democrats retain control of the House after losing 13 seats in the 2020 elections for the House of Representatives. The Senate became evenly split between Republicans (50 seats) and Democrats plus independents (Bernie Sanders and Angus King) who caucus with Democrats (48+2). As such, Democrats virtually gained control of the Senate because the vice president, Kamala Harris, has the power to cast tie-breaking votes in Senate. With Democratic politicians gaining control or majority of the presidency, the Senate, and the House, the Democratic Party regained significant political power after the 2020 election cycle.

In response to the COVID-19 pandemic, this Congress enacted the American Rescue Plan in March 2021, providing roughly $1.9 trillion in economic stimulus programs to advance the U.S. economic recovery. As a reaction to the attack on the United States Capitol on January 6, 2021, this Congress also enacted the Capitol Police Emergency Assistance Act of 2021 to provide greater capabilities to the Capitol Police. In December 2021, the Uyghur Forced Labor Prevention Act was passed unanimously by the Senate and by a vote of 428–1 in the House. The bill addresses several issues relating to forced labor activities in the Xinjiang province of China.

With a 40-year high in inflation and growing disapproval among U.S. voters about President Biden's performance, expectations in late-2021 and early-2022 were that the GOP would reclaim control of both chambers in the 2022 elections. With the Russian invasion of Ukraine in early 2022, this Congress has proposed legislation to provide financial and material aid to Ukraine in its defense of its territorial borders and sovereignty. The Defending Ukraine Sovereignty Act of 2022 aims to counter Russian aggression in the region by imposing sanctions on Russian entities and expedite security assistance to Ukraine.

In October 2024, members of the United States House of Representatives introduce a resolution in Congress to end Act 22. Once established as a Puerto Rican resident, individuals can pay only 4% income tax to the U.S. territory and pay no taxes on capital gains, dividends, and interest. In exchange, investors must agree to certain obligations, including a commitment to create jobs, make charitable donations, and purchase residential real estate, a law seen as unequal to Puerto Rican residents.

== See also ==
- D.B. Hardeman Prize
- History of lobbying in the United States
- History of the United States
- History of the United States House of Representatives
- History of the United States Senate
- List of LGBTQ members of the United States Congress
- List of first openly LGBTQ politicians in the United States Congress
- Joint Select Committee on Deficit Reduction
- Lobbying in the United States
- United States Capitol
- Richard Fenno
- January 6 United States Capitol attack
