= Master of the Senate =

2002 book by Robert Caro

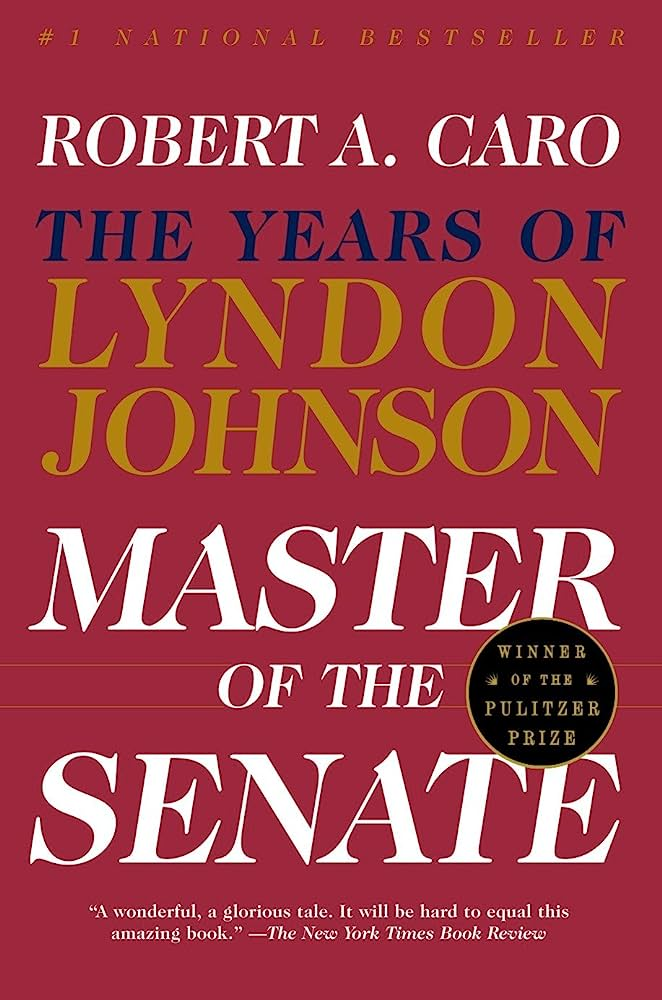
- Cover of Master of the Senate
- Author: Robert Caro
- Language: English
- Publication date: 2002

Master of the Senate is a 2002 book that deals with the Senatorial career of Lyndon B. Johnson by the American writer Robert Caro.

In Master of the Senate, Caro chronicles Johnson's rapid ascent in the United States Congress, particularly focusing on his tenure from 1949 to 1960 as Senate majority leader with the aim to show "how legislative power works in America". This 1,167-page work delves into Johnson's political acumen that Caro argues transformed the Senate from a stagnant institution into a dynamic legislative body by manipulating Senate rules, building a powerful coalition, and securing legislative victories, thereby laying the groundwork for his ascent to the presidency.

== Outline ==
The book starts with a 100-page history of the Senate, where Caro argues that in the mid 19th Century its deliberative nature delayed the Civil War by a couple of decades by being a place where the South (personified by John C. Calhoun), the North (Daniel Webster) and the rising West (Henry Clay) could reach national compromise. After the Civil War, Caro argues it lost its prominence firstly in domestic matters and later in foreign affairs through the combination of a lack of effective leadership, conservatism and the seniority system.

The second section talks about Johnson's early, powerless years when he at first "lay low", with a biography and discussion of his mentor Richard Russell, who it is argued was both a superlative senator but also a convinced racist, and an exploration of Johnson's identification with the Southern Democrats who were very powerful within the Senate, although being too closely aligned to them could be harmful to presidential ambitions. The book argues that to please financial backers in the Texas oil industry he orchestrated the sacking of their head regulator, Federal Power Commission Chairman Leland Olds by falsely accusing him of Communist sympathies, destroying his career. There is a chapter on his chairmanship of the Senate Preparedness Investigating Subcommittee which Caro argues was used to get favorable media coverage.

The third section charts his rapid rise to Senate Leader first as Democratic whip, and then Senate Minority Leader. The rise was through the support of the Russell and the Southern Caucus, but informal power was maintained through his close connection with the House Speaker Sam Rayburn although Johnson tried to expand his circle outside the South to Senate liberals, particularly Hubert Humphrey. Unlike other powerful positions, party leadership positions did not need seniority, but the positions had historically lacked power, although Johnson did get some power through his ability to raise campaign funds in Texas and disburse them to other senators. His use of the Democratic Policy Committee to control most of the Senate committees is argued to be crucial to the way he maintained power later.

The fourth section documents Johnson's rise to Majority Leader and gives examples of Johnson's use of power as leader of the Senate. In the 1954 Senate elections, the Democrats came very close to winning the Senate but needed the independent former Republican Wayne Morse, with whom Johnson had been feuding, although Johnson won him to the Democratic caucus. It argues that Johnson drove a wedge in the Senate between the Eisenhower Administration and the more conservative and isolationist Republican members of the Senate, under Robert Taft, by getting the Democratic caucus to support Eisenhower over measures such as the Bricker Amendment. It argues that Johnson reshaped the Senate into a far more effective legislature through retaining support of conservative fellow Southern Democrats while earning the cooperation of more liberal Democrats, particularly his future Vice President Hubert Humphrey. His reluctance to tackle McCarthyism, despite Johnson's dislike for it and his power, is also explored.

In what is described as "the most fully realized segment of the book" the fifth section describes Johnson's battle to pass the Civil Rights Act of 1957, navigating the north-south split in the Democrats between the southern and northern factions, the first such legislation since 1875 during Reconstruction. The book argues that although the 1957 Act was effectively gutted by Johnson in order to avoid a successful Southern filibuster it foreshadowed his effective Civil Rights measures during his Presidency.

There is a short final section that charts the years between the passage of the Civil Rights Act and the start of Johnson's 1960 campaign for President.

== Other volumes ==
Master of the Senate is the third volume of Robert Caro's expansive biography series The Years of Lyndon Johnson which began in 1977. Four volumes have been published with a fifth volume expected, running to more than 3,000 pages in total, detailing Johnson's early life, education, and political career. The series is published by Alfred A. Knopf.

== Reception ==
It won the 2003 Pulitzer Prize for Biography or Autobiography, the 2002 National Book Award for Nonfiction, the 2002 Los Angeles Times Book Prize for Biography, and the 2002 D.B. Hardeman Prize. However, the publication that year of the book was mentioned as a reason why one of the judges of the National Book Award, Michael Kinsley, read few of the nonfiction books in that year.

The book has also received praise from prominent politicians:

- Tom Daschle, a former Senate majority leader, once told the newspaper Roll Call after reading Master of the Senate that "I think the thing you learn from reading that magnificent book is that every day, this body makes history."
- Walter Mondale, a former US vice president, described Master of the Senate as a "superb work of history."
- Gordon Brown, a former British prime minister, when reviewing the book said of the series: "It's a wonderfully written set of books. The stories are quite breathtaking. ... These books challenge the view of history that politics is just about individual maneuvering. It's about ideas and principled policy achievements. That's what makes it one of the great political biographies."

Some reviewers claim that Caro's treatment of the Senate is colored by his own progressive politics. There is also a claim that Caro's treatment of Johnson changed from a condemnation in the first book on the President, published in 1982 but mostly written before Ronald Reagan's election and Master of the Senate, written in the 1990s at a time when the left was "shrunken" and so Johnson looked far better in comparison.
