= History of the United States House of Representatives =

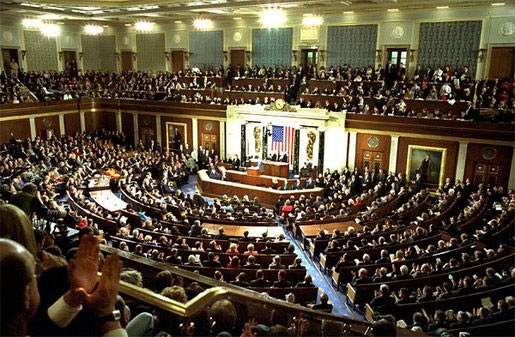
George W. Bush delivered his annual State of the Union address to a joint session of Congress on January 28, 2003, in the House chamber.

The United States House of Representatives, commonly known as the lower chamber of the United States Congress, along with the United States Senate, commonly known as the upper chamber, are the two parts of the legislative branch of the federal government of the United States. Like its counterpart, the House was established by the United States Constitution and convened for its first meeting on March 4, 1789, at Federal Hall in New York City. The history of this institution begins several years prior to that date, at the dawn of the American Revolutionary War. Since its inception in 1789, all representatives have been directly elected. Although suffrage was initially limited, it gradually widened, particularly after the ratification of the Nineteenth Amendment and the civil rights movement.

== The Continental Congresses ==
The First Continental Congress was a meeting of representatives of twelve of Great Britain's seventeen North American colonies, in the autumn of 1774. The Continental Congress sent a list of grievances to King George III. When the King failed to respond, and the American Revolutionary War began in April 1775, the Second Continental Congress was convened—this time with thirteen colonies in attendance. A year later, on July 4, 1776, the Continental Congress declared the thirteen colonies free and independent states, referring to them as the "united States of America." This was not a formal name, however, so "united" was not capitalized in the Declaration of Independence, "States" being capitalized only because all nouns were capitalized in English before the Industrial Revolution. The Second Continental Congress continued in office while the War for Independence continued, producing the Articles of Confederation— the country's first constitution— in 1777, which was ratified by all of the states by 1781.

== Articles of Confederation and new Constitution ==
Under the Articles of Confederation, the Congress of the Confederation was a unicameral body in which each state was equally represented, and in which each state had a veto over most action. States could, and did, ignore what did pass. The ineffectiveness of the federal government under the Articles led Congress to summon the Convention of 1787.

One of the most divisive issues facing the Convention was the structure of Congress. James Madison's Virginia Plan called for a bicameral Congress; the lower house would be elected directly by the people, and the upper house would be elected by the lower house. The plan drew the support of delegates from large states such as Virginia, Massachusetts, and Pennsylvania, as it called for representation based on population. The smaller states, however, favored the New Jersey Plan, which called for a unicameral Congress with equal representation for the states. Eventually, a compromise, known as the Connecticut Compromise or the Great Compromise was reached; one house of Congress (the House of Representatives) would provide proportional representation, whereas the other (the Senate) would provide equal representation. The Constitution was ratified by the end of 1788, and its full implementation was set for March 4, 1789.

== 18th century ==
The House of Representatives began work on April 1, 1789, when it achieved a quorum for the first time, with 59 members elected from 11 states. In 1790, North Carolina and Rhode Island elected representatives, bringing the total count of representatives to 65.

In the 1st United States Congress, Frederick Muhlenberg, a Pennsylvania Lutheran minister and politician, was the first Speaker of the House.

== 19th century ==
The early 19th century was marked by the assertion of Congress' gradual independence from the Presidency starting from the presidency of James Madison and onward. The House became the preeminent institution in Congress, originally overshadowing the Senate. For most of the first half of the 19th century, a balance between the free North and the slaveholding South existed in the Senate, as the numbers of free and slave states were equal. However, since the North was much more populous than the South, it dominated the House of Representatives. In 1825, new Speaker of the House Henry Clay also officially announced that he and his followers would separate from Andrew Jackson and form the National Republican Party. Clay lost to Jackson in the 1832 presidential election and moved to the Senate.

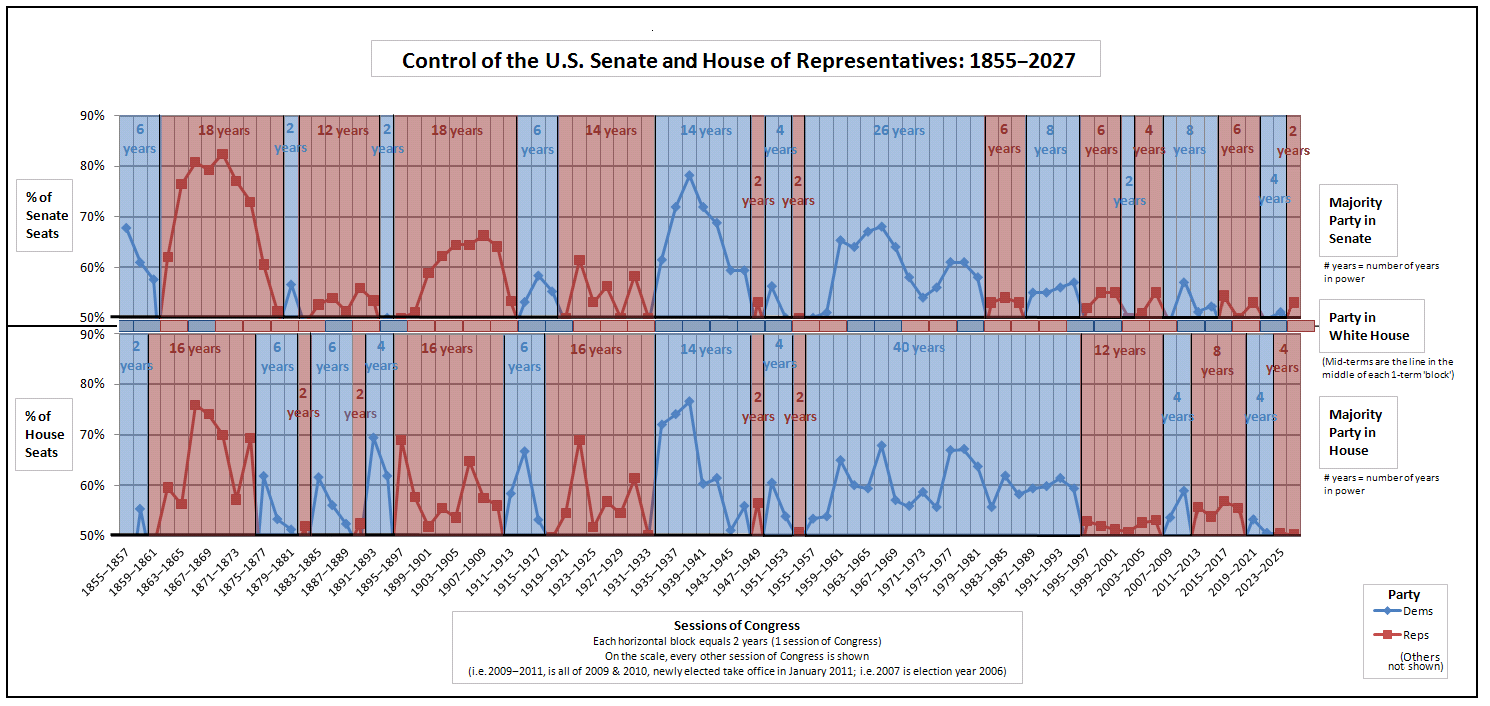
Historical graph of party control of the Senate and House as well as the Presidency

During the Civil War, the key policy-maker in Congress was Thaddeus Stevens, as chairman of the Ways and Means Committee and as Republican floor leader. He took charge of major legislation that funded the war effort and revolutionized the nation's economic policies regarding tariffs, bonds, income and excise taxes, national banks, suppression of money issued by state banks, greenback currency, and western railroad land grants.

Stevens was also one of the major policymakers regarding Reconstruction, and obtained a House vote of impeachment against President Andrew Johnson (who was acquitted by the Senate in 1868). Hans Trefousse, his leading biographer, concludes that Stevens "was one of the most influential representatives ever to serve in Congress. [He dominated] the House with his wit, knowledge of parliamentary law, and sheer willpower, even though he was often unable to prevail." Historiographical views of Stevens have dramatically shifted over the years, from the early 20th-century view of Stevens and the Radical Republicans as tools of big business and motivated by hatred of the white South, to the perspective of the neoabolitionists of the 1950s and afterwards, who applauded their efforts to give equal rights to the freed slaves.

The Democrats were a weak minority from 1861 to 1874, then made a major comeback in 1874 by winning 93 seats held by the GOP and becoming the majority. The Gilded Age was marked by close balances in the House, with the parties alternating control.

Between 1860 and 1920 the average tenure of House members doubled from four to eight years. This number reflects the growth of "congressional careerism." The House began to develop a more stable culture, sessions of the House became longer, and members of the House began to specialize in specific areas of policy. Power was decentralized from the Speaker of the House, and seniority nearly assured advancement within the House. The increasing importance of the federal government, an increasing acceptance of lengthy congressional service, and (after 1896) a decline in the partisan competitiveness of congressional districts all contributed to the growing length of the average term of House members.

== 20th and 21st-centuries ==
House of Representatives 1900-48

The early 20th century witnessed the rise of party leadership in both houses of Congress. In the House of Representatives, the office of Speaker became extremely powerful, reaching its zenith under the Republican Joseph Gurney Cannon. In particular, committee chairmen remained particularly strong in both houses until the rules reforms of the 1970s.

On November 7, 1916, Jeannette Rankin was elected to Montana's at-large seat in the House of Representatives, becoming the first female member of Congress. In 1973 Speaker of the House Carl Albert appointed Felda Looper as the first female page in the House of Representatives.

After the beginning of the Great Depression and the New Deal, the Democrats controlled the House from 1931 to 1994, with two exceptions (1946 and 1952), as the New Deal Coalition was successful. In terms of legislation, however, the Conservative coalition usually blocked liberal legislative proposals, except in 1964–65 when President Lyndon Johnson had the majorities to pass his Great Society proposals. The most important leader was long-time Democratic Speaker Sam Rayburn. The Republicans under Newt Gingrich returned to a majority in the election of 1994, as part of the Republican Revolution that gave the party both houses and a majority of governorships that year.

The Democrats gained 30 seats in the 2006 elections, regaining control and electing Nancy Pelosi as the first female Speaker. They strengthened their control during the 2008 elections, gaining an additional 21 seats. However, the Republicans soon erased those gains after gaining 63 seats in the 2010 elections, the largest seat change for any election since 1948. Republican control of the house remained until the 2018 elections.

== Number of Representatives ==
Size of House of Representatives 1789–2009

The 435 seats of the House grouped by state

Congress has the power to regulate the size of the House of Representatives, and the size of the House has varied through the years in response to the admission of new states, reapportionment following a census, and the Civil War.

Year	1789	1791	1793	1795	1801	1803	1811	1813	1815	1817	1819	1821	1823	1833	1835	1843	1845	1847	1851	1853	1857
Representatives	65	69	105	106	107	142	143	182	183	185	186	187	213	240	242	223	225	227	233	234	237

Year	1861	1863	1865	1867	1869	1873	1883	1889	1891	1893	1901	1911	1913	1959	1961	1963
Representatives	178	183	191	193	243	293	325	330	333	357	386	391	435	435	435	435

In 1911, Congress passed the Apportionment Act of 1911, also known as 'Public Law 62-5', which capped the size of the United States House of Representatives at 435 seats. Arizona, New Mexico, Alaska, and Hawaii were each granted one representative when they first entered the union. During the next reapportionment, the size of the House was again limited to 435 seats, with the seats divided among the states by population, with each state getting at least one seat.

By the 2000s, the U.S. population had more than tripled since the 1911 expansion of the House to its current 435 seats; accordingly, proposals began to be made by commentators such as George F. Will, Robert Novak, and Paul Jacob to further increase the size of the House. One such proposal, the Wyoming Rule, calls for adding enough members to Congress to reduce the population of the average Congressional district to the population of the least populous state's smallest district; in 1990, this would have resulted in a total House size of 547.

== Representatives who served as President ==
As of 1993, a total of 19 U.S. Presidents have also been members of the House of Representatives.

Name	Years as Representative	Years as President	State
James Madison	1789–1797	1809–1817	VA
John Quincy Adams	1831–1848	1825–1829	MA
Andrew Jackson	1796–1797	1829–1837	TN
William Henry Harrison	1816–1819	1841	OH
John Tyler	1816–1821	1841–1845	VA
James K. Polk	1825–1839	1845–1849	TN
Millard Fillmore	1833–1835; 1837–1843	1850–1853	NY
Franklin Pierce	1833–1837	1853–1857	NH
James Buchanan	1821–1831	1857–1861	PA
Abraham Lincoln	1847–1849	1861–1865	IL
Andrew Johnson	1843–1853	1865–1869	TN
Rutherford B. Hayes	1866–1867	1877–1881	OH
James A. Garfield	1863–1880	1881	OH
William McKinley	1877–1884; 1885–1891	1897–1901	OH
John F. Kennedy	1947–1953	1961–1963	MA
Lyndon B. Johnson	1937–1949	1963–1969	TX
Richard M. Nixon	1947–1950	1969–1974	CA
Gerald Ford	1949–1973	1974–1977	MI
George H.W. Bush	1967–1971	1989–1993	TX

== See also ==
- History of the United States Senate
- List of United States Congresses
- Party divisions of United States Congresses
