= History of the United States Senate =

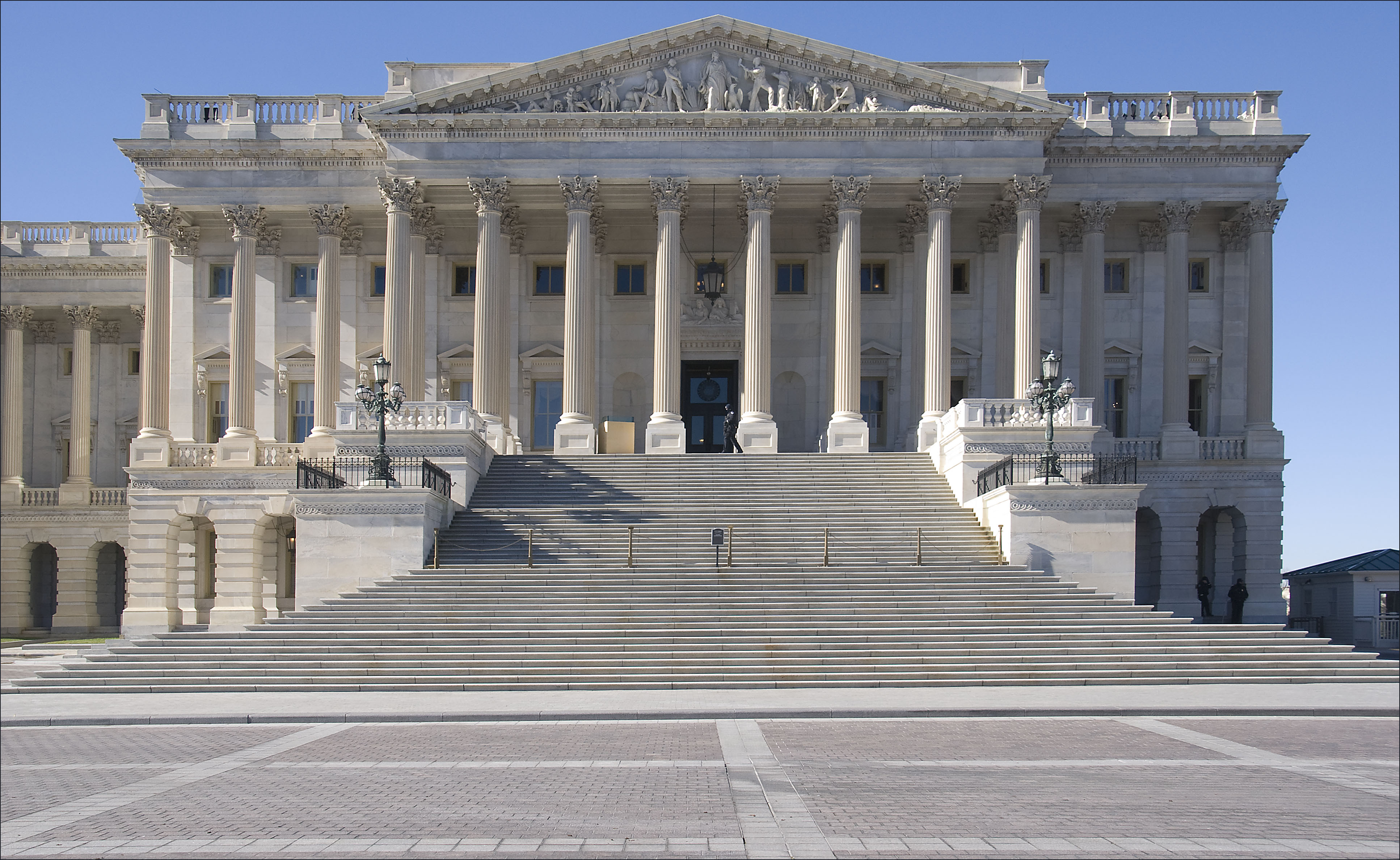
The United States Senate building, built in 1859. Photographed in 2013.

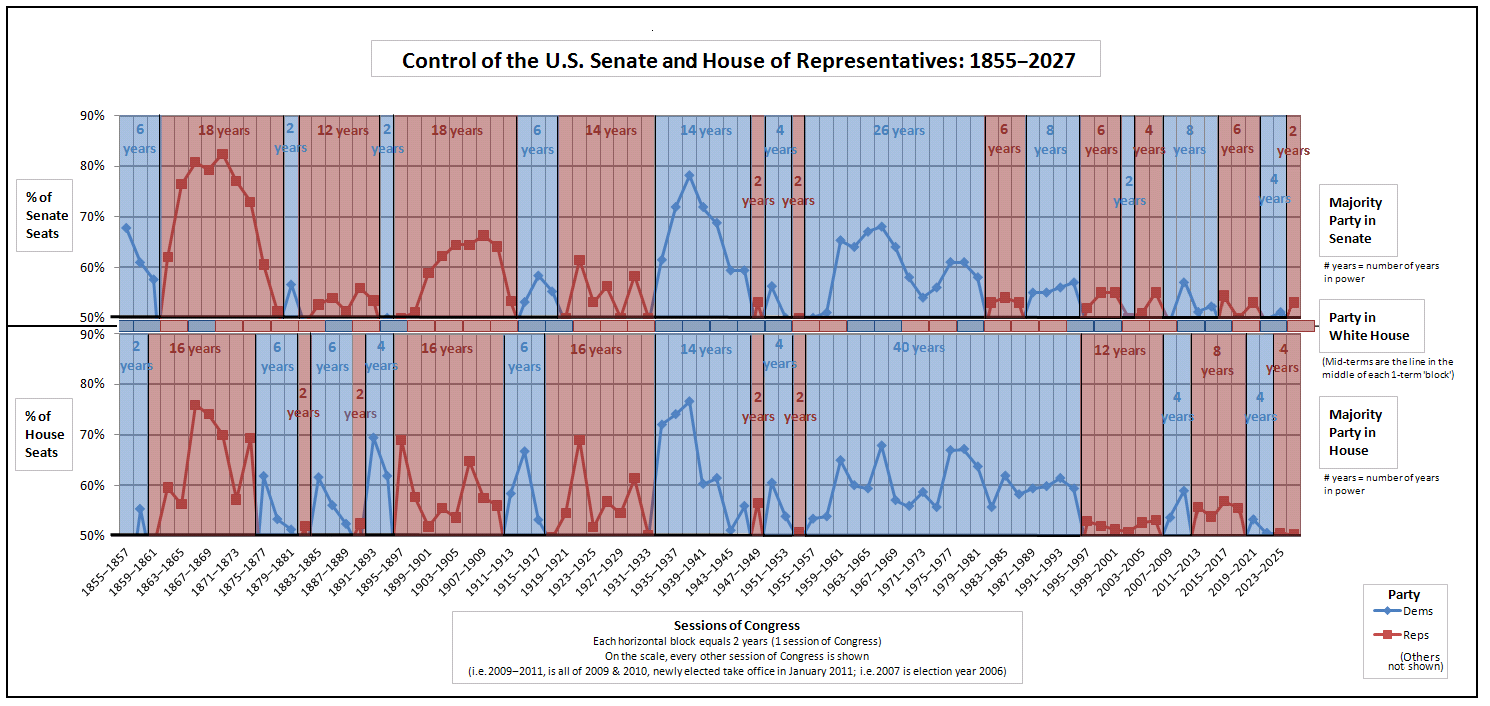
Historical graph of party control of the Senate and House, as well as the Presidency

The United States Senate is the upper legislative chamber of the United States Congress, the federal legislature of the United States government. It sits in the North Wing of the United States Capitol.

The Senate originates from the Constitutional Convention of 1787. In the Virginia Plan, delegate James Madison proposed a bicameral legislature with two chambers, each proportional to population. In the New Jersey Plan, delegate William Paterson proposed a unicameral legislature with one chamber, with one vote per state. The Senate emerged from the Connecticut Compromise, which ended in a closely contested 5–4 vote that granted smaller states equal representation in the Senate.

The Founders who supported the Senate conceived of it as a check on the House of Representatives, where states with more voters receive more seats. By contrast, the Senate grants each state two senators, regardless of size or population. The Founders who opposed the Senate saw it as a political concession to small states with no basis in democratic principles.

Since its creation, reformers have proposed reforms to the Senate or its outright abolition. Following the ratification of the 17th Amendment in 1913, senators began to be elected by direct popular vote. Previously, senators were chosen by state legislatures.

== 1789–1865 ==
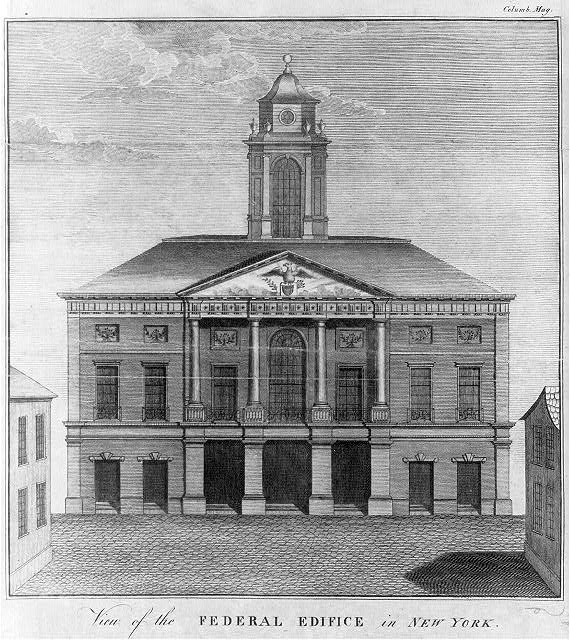
The exterior view of Federal Hall, designated the site of the federal government in 1788

The United States Congress, established by the U.S. Constitution, met at New York City's Federal Hall on March 4, 1789. Initially, the Senate met behind closed doors, with no gallery for the public or journalists to spectate. It utilized the Senate Journal for communications with the press and public instead. The early Senate met in secret, similar to the Continental Congress. This practice drew criticism, as the House of Representatives met in public, and a growing number of states became concerned that the Senate should be held accountable in a similar way. In 1794, a resolution passed to open the Senate chamber. In December 1795, the press and public were able to listen to a debate.

The role of the vice president, as the president of the Senate, was an issue within the early Senate. The first vice president, John Adams, was allowed to craft legislation and participate in debates, but these rights were quickly removed. Although the Founding Fathers intended the Senate to be the slower and more deliberate legislative body, the House spent more time considering legislation in the early years of the Republic. For instance, Secretary of the Treasury Alexander Hamilton's Bank of the United States and Assumption Bill passed the Senate with little difficulty but faced significant opposition and lengthy debate in the House.

Thomas Jefferson began the vice-presidential tradition of only attending Senate sessions on special occasions. Despite his frequent absences, Jefferson impacted the Senate's parliamentary procedures with his 1801 Manual of Parliamentary Practice for the Use of the Senate of the United States, which is still influential today.

In 1804, the House of Representatives, reflecting public and presidential sentiment against Federalist judges, voted to impeach Supreme Court Justice Samuel Chase. However, the Senate voted to acquit him and established a precedent that impeachment should not be used for political disagreement. As vice president, Aaron Burr presided over the impeachment trial. After the trial, Burr said:

"This House is a sanctuary; a citadel of law, of order, and of liberty; and it is here–in this exalted refuge; here if anywhere, will resistance be made to the storms of political frenzy and the silent arts of corruption."

In the following decades, the Senate played an increasingly visible role in national political debates. Senators John C. Calhoun, Daniel Webster, Thomas Hart Benton, Stephen A. Douglas, and Henry Clay played roles in national policy discussions.

The Webster–Hayne debate of January 1830, pitting the federal government's interests against South Carolina due to controversial tariffs like the Tariff of 1828, is widely regarded as a significant moment in Senate history. The debate pitted the sectional interests between New England and the South, as Daniel Webster advocated for the federation and unity between states, while Robert Y. Hayne argued on behalf of states' rights and protection from federal overreach.

=== Move to the Capitol Building ===
On July 4, 1851, construction of the new Senate Chamber began in the United States Capitol. It was designed by Thomas Ustick Walter and Montgomery C. Meigs. Walter designed the chamber without windows to prevent any noises or drafts that might affect the senators as they engaged in debate. The Senate Chamber was much larger than the previous Federal Hall, which was only 40 feet long and 30 feet wide. The chamber opened for congressional use in 1859.

=== Slavery and sectional conflict ===
In the decades that leading up to the American Civil War, slavery was a central issue shaping debate in the United States Senate. Unlike the House of Representatives, where population differences gave the Northern free states increasing influence, the Senate's equal representation of states allowed Southern slave states to retain substantial power. This structure made the chamber a focal point for sectional tension and placed ongoing pressure on lawmakers to maintain a balance between free and slave states.

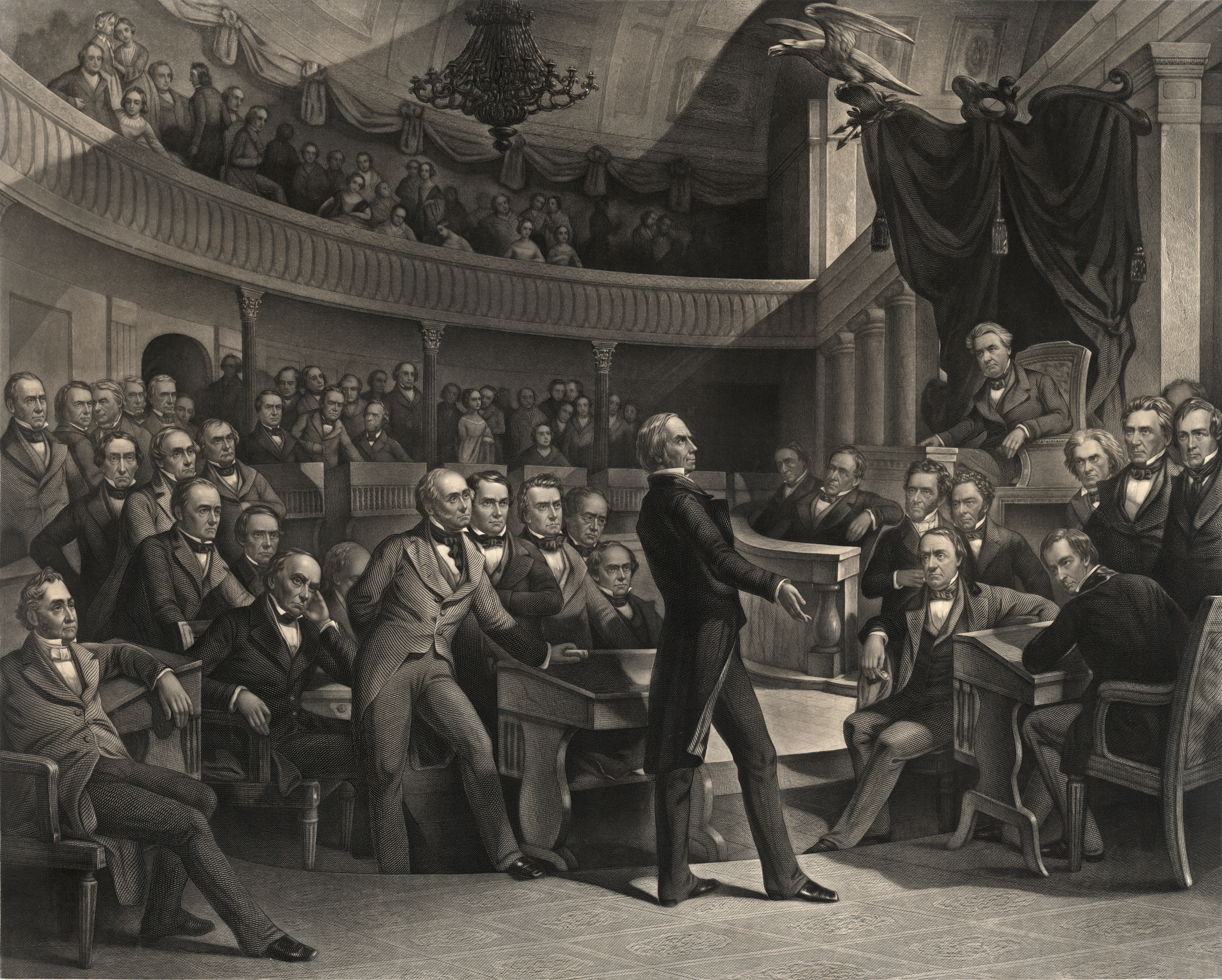
Debate over Compromise of 1850 in the Old Senate Chamber. Digitally restored.

To preserve this balance, Congress adopted a series of legislative compromises. The Missouri Compromise of 1820, brokered by Henry Clay, admitted Maine as a free state and Missouri as a slave state, temporarily stabilizing sectional equilibrium. However, as the nation expanded westward, the maintaining parity became increasingly difficult. The Compromise of 1850, negotiated by Clay and Stephen A. Douglas, addressed the status of territories acquired from Mexico and included a strengthened Fugitive Slave Law, further intensifying national debate.

In 1856, Senator Charles Sumner of Massachusetts was assaulted nearly to death on the Senate floor by Representative Preston Brooks of South Carolina following Sumner's speech criticizing slavery and its supporters. He resigned shortly after, but during the special election following his resignation, he was re-elected to the House.

According to Article I, Section 5 of the U.S. Constitution, Congress retains the right to "punish its members for disorderly behavior, and with the concurrence of two-thirds, expel a member." The Senate has only expelled 15 members since 1789 — fourteen being expelled during the Civil War for supporting the Confederacy.

== 1865–1913s ==
In the decades following the Civil War, the Senate addressed major national questions such as Reconstruction and monetary policy. During the Third Party System, state legislatures—dominated by strong party organizations—determined Senate elections, ensuring that party leaders and influential figures could secure seats. This era also coincided with rapid industrial expansion when entrepreneurs and financiers gained prestige comparable to that of military leaders, and several entered the Senate.

In 1870, Hiram Revels of Mississippi became the first African American senator. Chosen by state Republicans under pressure from Black legislators, Revels filled a short unexpired term and was seated after a 48–8 Senate vote following objections from some members. Revels used his brief tenure to advocate for civil rights and protest racial segregation. Four years later, Mississippi's legislature appointed Blanche Bruce, who served a full term from 1875 to 1881 and presided over the Senate in 1879. He was the last African American senator until 1967.

Although they only held the majority for only two years from 1881 to 1913, the Democratic Party made major strides in pioneering formal leadership positions by establishing a party leader or floor leader. The majority and minority leaders communicated their party's positions, coordinated their respective legislative strategies, and played a major role in the day-to-day operations of floor procedure.

Between 1871 and 1898, the Senate rejected or stalled numerous treaties, including reciprocal trade agreements and proposals to annex the Dominican Republic and the Danish West Indies. It also blocked an arbitration treaty with Britain. In 1898, the Senate came close to rejecting the treaty that ended the Spanish American War.

By the turn of the century, Senate leadership was dominated by a small group of Republicans, notably Nelson Aldrich of Rhode Island, Orville Platt of Connecticut, John Coit Spooner of Wisconsin, William Boyd Allison of Iowa, and national party figure Mark Hanna of Ohio. Aldrich in particular shaped federal tax and tariff policy and played a central role in establishing the Federal Reserve System. Among Democrats, Arthur Pue Gorman of Maryland was elected caucus chairman to promote party unity, energize senators, and counter factionalism.

In 1907, Charles Curtis of Kansas became the first Native American senator. A registered member of the Kaw Nation with Osage and Potawatomi heritage, Curtis chaired the Indian Affairs Committee. He promoted assimilationist policies and sponsored legislation that limited tribal sovereignty, reflecting the federal government's prevailing approach to Native American affairs at the time.

== 1913–1945 ==
From 1913 to 1945, the United States Senate underwent numerous political reforms. During this period, it adopted procedural reforms, clearer rules for debate, and stronger leadership structures.

=== Democratization and representation ===
In 1913, the Seventeenth Amendment required senators to be elected directly by voters instead of being chosen by state legislatures. This reform aimed to make senators directly accountable to the electorate.

The period also brought early changes in Senate representation. On November 21, 1922, Rebecca Latimer Felton of Georgia became the first woman to serve in the Senate, although her appointment lasted only one day. In 1928, Octaviano Ambrosio Larrazolo of New Mexico became the first Latino senator, filling a three-month unexpired term. In 1932, Hattie Caraway of Arkansas became the first woman elected to the Senate. Initially appointed following her husband's death, she later won re-election twice in her own right. In 1935, Dennis Chávez of New Mexico became the first Latino elected to a full Senate term.

=== Regulation of debate and obstruction ===
The Senate also revised the way it handled extended debate. Senators had long been able to delay legislation through the filibuster, but it was used infrequently before the twentieth century.

During World War I, William Jennings Bryan and 20 other senators blocked a bill that would have allowed U.S. merchant ships to be armed. In response, the Senate adopted the cloture rule in 1917, allowing debate to end with a two-thirds vote. President Woodrow Wilson criticized the senators involved, calling them a “group of willful men.”

=== Leadership and agenda control ===
Leadership within the Senate became more structured during this period. The position of Senate Majority Leader was created, replacing an informal system in which influence was exercised mainly by committee chairs or senior senators, such as Daniel Webster or Nelson Aldrich.

At first, the role carried limited authority beyond priority to speak, and divisions within the Democratic Party—especially between northern liberals and southern conservatives—further limited its effectiveness.

From 1923 to 1937, Joseph T. Robinson of Arkansas served as Democratic leader of the Senate and played a key role in guiding legislation during both Republican administrations and the New Deal. He supported Presidents Calvin Coolidge and Herbert Hoover on measures such as the Muscle Shoals project and the Hoover Tariff and later helped advance much of President Franklin D. Roosevelt’s New Deal legislation. His influence was widely noted; humorist Will Rogers joked, “Congress doesn't pass legislation any more, they just wave at the bills as they go by.”

In 1937, the Senate strengthened the role of the majority leader by adopting the rule of first recognition, which gave the leader priority when seeking recognition to speak. This change gave Senate leaders greater control over the legislative agenda.

=== Institutional independence ===
Throughout this period, the Senate continued to act independently of the executive branch. Even as presidential power expanded during the New Deal era, senators asserted their authority to oppose proposals they believed exceeded constitutional or fiscal limits.

In 1937, the Senate rejected President Franklin D. Roosevelt's proposal to expand the Supreme Court, commonly known as the “court-packing” plan. The decision demonstrated the chamber's willingness to resist presidential initiatives, even during a period of strong executive leadership.

The Senate also called for reduced federal deficits that same year, further signaling its readiness to challenge presidential priorities it disagreed with.

== 1945–present ==
After World War II ended in 1945, the Senate focused heavily on Cold War foreign policy. Between 1945 and 1953, it ratified U.S. participation in the North Atlantic Treaty Organization (NATO) in 1949, and approved funding for the Truman Doctrine (1947) and Marshall Plan (1948), aimed at containing Soviet influence and aiding European recovery.

In the early 1950s the Senate was shaken by anti-communist investigations led by Senator Joseph McCarthy of Wisconsin. McCarthy claimed that communists had infiltrated the federal government and other influential institutions. Over time, many of his accusations were found to lack evidence, and his investigations expanded to include targets such as the U.S. Army, universities, Hollywood, and business leaders. The Senate censured McCarthy in December 1954 by a 67–22 vote, effectively ending his influence due to the fact that he could no longer spread these accusations.

The position of Democratic Whip opened up when Senator Francis J. Myers of Pennsylvania lost his reelection bid in the 1950 midterms. Senator Lyndon B. Johnson, then only a second-year Senator, asked his close ally, Senator Richard B. Russell, leader of the Southern bloc of the Senate Democrats, to help him gain the support of the rest of the Southern bloc. Russell quietly approached other powerful Southern senators to tell them that the Southern bloc was completely unified behind Johnson for the position of whip; eventually this became true. Potential rivals to the position decided not to challenge Johnson upon realizing the whole Southern bloc was united in choosing him. Majority Leader Ernest McFarland nominated Johnson for the post, and he was unanimously elected without any opposing candidates.

A power vacuum occurred when Ernest McFarland lost his reelection bid in 1952. Once again, Senator Russell backed Johnson, and Johnson was elected Democratic Minority Leader. One of Senator Johnson's first actions as Minority Leader was reforming the seniority system such that no Democratic Senator would be given a second choice committee assignment until every Democratic senator, including even the newest freshman senators, were given an assignment. The new system eased tensions between Senate Democrats as Northern liberals were finally receiving meaningful committee assignments. Southern Democratic senators long held great power in the Senate because of their seniority, having decades-long tenures, but Johnson's new rule, having made seniority less significant, allowed for the assignment of more newly-elected senators to committees.

Senator Johnson became Majority Leader after the 1954 elections restored a Democratic majority in the Senate. In 1957, Johnson championed the first civil rights legislation since the reconstruction era in the Civil Rights Act of 1957 by convincing Southern Democrats not to filibuster, but to allow a weak bill through to ease tensions over the subject. A key amendment from Senator Joseph O'Mahoney, which stipulated that anyone charged with contempt for blocking a citizen's right to vote would be granted a jury trial, helped secure the bill's passage. The bill came under heavy criticism from Northern liberals for being too weak, particularly over the jury-trial amendment, with liberal Senator Paul Douglas calling it "a soup made from the shadow of a crow which had starved to death."

The legislation for the Civil Rights Act of 1964 took months to pass through the Senate. A group of 18 Southern senators organized themselves into three rotating shifts to hold the Senate floor 24 hours a day, 7 days a week to filibuster the bill, even setting up cots in Senate cloakrooms. The bill's floor manager, Senator Hubert Humphrey negotiated help from Republican Minority Leader Everett Dirksen to rally support from conservative Midwestern Republicans. The filibuster lasted sixty days, with cloture finally being invoked by a vote of 71 to 29. The final vote to pass the bill was 73 to 27, with 46 Democrats and 27 Republicans voting for it.

Procedural changes in the Senate included lowering the cloture threshold for ending filibusters from two-thirds to three-fifths in 1975.

The Democratic Party held the majority of seats from the 84th Congress to the 96th Congress (1955–1981), the longest continuous majority in United States Senate history, making an important mark on the United States.

=== Diversity in the Senate ===
Representation in the U.S. Senate expanded slowly over the second half of the 20th century and into the early 21st century, reflecting changes in both Senate membership and institutional roles. In 1959, Senator Hiram Fong of Hawaii became the first Asian American elected to the Senate, where he supported civil rights legislation and reforms aimed at expanding voting access for Asian Americans. This raised his support from the minority, however it cost him some support in those who did not support the legislation.

In 1966, Senator Edward W. Brooke of Massachusetts became the first African American to be popularly elected to the Senate since the Reconstruction era. A liberal Republican, he served two terms and focused on civil rights and social reform. In 1992, Senator Carol Moseley Braun of Illinois became the first African American woman elected to the Senate. During her single term, she emphasized education reform and gun control.

Changes in representation were also reflected in Senate roles beyond elected office. In 1971, Paulette Desell became the first female Senate page, following her appointment by Senator Jacob K. Javits. In 2009, Kathie Alvarez became the first woman to serve as a legislative clerk in the Senate.

In the 21st century, further milestones marked broader diversity within the chamber. In 2012, Senator Tammy Baldwin was elected as the first openly gay U.S. Senator. The following year, Senator Mazie Hirono became the first Asian American woman elected to the Senate. In 2017, Senator Catherine Cortez Masto became the first Latina and Mexican American woman to serve in the Senate.

In 2025, Senator Lisa Blunt Rochester and Senator Angela Alsobrooks were the first African American women to serve simultaneously in the Senate. That same year, Senator Andy Kim was elected as New Jersey’s first Asian American senator and the first Korean American to serve in the chamber.

== Senators who have served as President ==
There are 17 US Presidents that have been members of the Senate prior to taking office as the President of the United States. These were:

Name	Years as Senator	Years as President	State
James Monroe	1790–1794	1817–1825	VA
John Quincy Adams	1803–1808	1825–1829	MA
Andrew Jackson	1797–1798; 1823–1825	1829–1837	TN
Martin Van Buren	1821–1828	1837–1841	NY
William Henry Harrison	1825–1828	1841	OH
John Tyler	1827–1836	1841–1845	VA
Franklin Pierce	1837–1842	1853–1857	NH
James Buchanan	1834–1845	1857–1861	PA
Andrew Johnson	1857–1862, 1875	1865–1869	TN
Benjamin Harrison	1881–1887	1889–1893	IN
Warren G. Harding	1915–1921	1921–1923	OH
Harry S. Truman	1935–1945	1945–1953	MO
John F. Kennedy	1953–1960	1961–1963	MA
Lyndon B. Johnson	1949–1961	1963–1969	TX
Richard M. Nixon	1950–1953	1969–1974	CA
Barack Obama	2005–2008	2009–2017	IL
Joe Biden	1973–2009	2021–2025	DE

== See also ==
External videos
- Booknotes interview with Donald Ritchie on Press Gallery, July 7, 1991, C-SPAN

- History of the United States House of Representatives
- List of United States Congresses
- Party divisions of United States Congresses
- Resignation from the United States Senate
- Reform of the Senate

== Bibliography ==
=== References linked to notes ===
- "A Visual Guide: The Balance of Power Between Congress and the Presidency, 1945–2008". U.S. Politics. About.com. n.d. [last updated January 5, 2009]. Archived from the original on November 1, 2012 – via Wayback Machine.
- Chait, Jonathan (August 19–26, 2002). "Rogue State – The Case Against Delaware". The New Republic.
- "Caraway, Hattie Wyatt". Biographical Directory of the United States Congress (online). U.S. Government Printing Office.
- "Caraway, Hattie Wyatt". Biographical Directory of the United States Congress, 1774–2005 (book volume). U.S. Government Printing Office. January 3, 2005. p. 784 – via Google Books. 108th Congress, 2nd Session → Senate Document 108–222 H.Con.Res. 138; LCCN 2004-114224; ISBN 0-1607-3176-3; OCLC 256528124 (all editions).
- Caro, Robert Allan (2013) [1982]. Master of the Senate. Knopf.
  1. Vol. 1: The Path to Power (1982) (1st ed.). LCCN 90-201781; ISBN 0-3944-9973-5; OCLC 608805975 (all editions).
  2. Vol. 2: Means of Ascent (1990) (1st ed.). LCCN 9005048 9-5048; ISBN 978-0-3945-2835-9, 0-3945-2835-2; OCLC 903356708 (all editions).
  3. Vol. 3: Master of the Senate (2002) (1st ed.). LCCN 2002-282796; ISBN 0-3945-2836-0; ISBN 978-1-8479-2613-5, 1-8479-2613-4; OCLC 1103977277 (all editions).
  4. Vol. 4: The Passage of Power (2013) (1st ed.). LCCN 201253361 201-253361; ISBN 978-0-6794-0507-8, 0-6794-0507-0; OCLC 794593987 (all editions).
- Hartman, Susan (1999). "Caraway, Hattie Ophelia Wyatt (1 Feb. 1878 – 21 Dec. 1950)". American National Biography. Vol. 4 (of 24). American Council of Learned Societies, by Oxford University Press. pp. 369–370 – via Internet Archive. LCCN 98-20826; ISBN 0-1952-0635-5, 0-1951-2783-8 (full set & just Vol. 4); OCLC 772374229 (all editions) (Vol. 4).
- Fox News (February 13, 2015) [last update, December 31, 2016]. "Kathie Alvarez, the Senate's First Female Legislative Clerk, Retires".
- Lee, Frances E.; Oppenheimer, Bruce Ian (1999). "Chapter 2". Sizing Up the Senate: The Unequal Consequences of Equal Representation. University of Chicago Press. p. 33 – via Google Books. LCCN 99-20500; ISBN 0-2264-7005-9, 978-0-2264-7005-4; ISBN 0-2264-7006-7, 978-0-2264-7006-1; OCLC 246187030 (all editions).
- Madison, James (n.d.). "The Debates in the Federal Convention of 1787" (online). Avalon Project, Lillian Goldman Law Library, Yale Law School.
- Parker, David Bryce Jr. (May 14, 2003) [last edited July 20, 2020]. "Rebecca Latimer Felton (1835–1930)". New Georgia Encyclopedia (online). University of Georgia Press; University System of Georgia/Georgia Library Learning Online; and the Office of the Georgia Governor. (the author is from Kennesaw State University).
- Johnson, Michael A. (2006). "Michael A. Johnson: Deputy Assistant Sergeant at Arms" (PDF). "Oral History Interviews" (oral history interview). Interviewed by Ritchie, Donald A. Washington, D.C.: Senate Historical Office. OCLC 173005222. Archived from the original (PDF) on December 13, 2020. → Johnson attended the U.S. Capital Page School (thru 11th grade); graduated from McKinley Technology High School (1974); Cornell (B.S.; 1978); Bowie State University (M.S.).
- Rosenfeld, Richard N. (May 2004). "What Democracy? The Case for Abolishing the United States Senate". Harper's Magazine. Vol. 308, no. 1848. pp. 36, 42.
- "The Senate and the United States Constitution". United States Senate. n.d.

== References not linked to notes ==
=== References ===
- Barone, Michael, and Grant Ujifusa, The Almanac of American Politics 1976: The Senators, the Representatives and the Governors: Their Records and Election Results, Their States and Districts (1975); new edition every 2 years, informal practices, and member information)
- Congressional Quarterly Congress and the Nation: 2001–2004: A Review of Government and Politics: 107th and 108th Congresses (2005); summary of Congressional activity, as well as major executive and judicial decisions; based on Congressional Quarterly Weekly Report and the annual CQ almanac.
  - Congressional Quarterly Congress and the Nation: 1997–2001 (2002)
  - Congressional Quarterly Congress and the Nation: 1993–1996 (1998)
  - Congressional Quarterly Congress and the Nation: 1989–1992 (1993)
  - Congressional Quarterly Congress and the Nation: 1985–1988 (1989)
  - Congressional Quarterly Congress and the Nation: 1981–1984 (1985)
  - Congressional Quarterly Congress and the Nation: 1977–1980 (1981)
  - Congressional Quarterly Congress and the Nation: 1973–1976 (1977)
  - Congressional Quarterly Congress and the Nation: 1969–1972 (1973)
  - Congressional Quarterly Congress and the Nation: 1965–1968 (1969)
  - Congressional Quarterly Congress and the Nation: 1945–1964 (1965), the first of the series

=== Institutional studies ===
- Brady, David W. and Mathew D. McCubbins, eds. Party, Process, and Political Change in Congress: New Perspectives on the History of Congress (2002)
- Cooper, John Milton, Jr. Breaking the Heart of the World: Woodrow Wilson and the Fight for the League of Nations. (Cambridge U. Press, 2001).
- Feinman, Ronald L. Twilight of progressivism: the western Republican senators and the New Deal (Johns Hopkins University Press, 1981)
- Feldman, Gabe. "Death of a senator: Life expectancy and causes of death in 20th-century US senators." American journal of public health 93.5 (2003): 771-771. online
- Finley, Keith M. Delaying the Dream: Southern Senators and the Fight Against Civil Rights, 1938-1965 (LSU Press, 2008).
- Goodwin, George. "The seniority system in Congress." American Political Science Review 53.2 (1959): 412-436.
- Gould, Lewis L. The Most Exclusive Club: A History Of The Modern United States Senate (2005) the latest full-scale history by a scholar
- Harmon, F. Martin. Presidents versus Senators: Conflicts and Rivalries That Shaped America (2021) excerpt
- Hernon, Joseph Martin. Profiles in Character: Hubris and Heroism in the U.S. Senate, 1789–1990 (Sharpe, 1997).
- Hoebeke, C. H. The Road to Mass Democracy: Original Intent and the Seventeenth Amendment. (Transaction Books, 1995).
- Hunt, Richard. (1998). "Using the Records of Congress in the Classroom," OAH Magazine of History, 12 (Summer): 34–37.
- Johnson, Robert David. The Peace Progressives and American Foreign Relations. (Harvard U. Press, 1995). in 1920s and 1930s
- Koger, Gregory. "Cloture reform and party government in the Senate, 1918–1925." Journal of politics 68.3 (2006): 708-719.
- Malsberger, John W. From Obstruction to Moderation: The Transformation of Senate Conservatism, 1938–1952. (Susquehanna U. Press 2000).
- Paulos, Michael Harold and Konden Smith Hansen. The Reed Smoot Hearings: The Investigation of a Mormon Senator and the Transformation of an American Religion (2022) the first Mormon Senator
- Ritchie, Donald A. Press Gallery: Congress and the Washington Correspondents. (Harvard UP, 1991).
- Ritchie, Donald A. The Congress of the United States: A Student Companion (Oxford UP, 2001).
- Ritchie, Donald A. Reporting from Washington: The History of the Washington Press Corps (Oxford UP, 2005).
- Rothman, David J. Politics and power; the United States Senate, 1869-1901 (Harvard UP, 1966) richly detailed scholarly history online
- Swift, Elaine K. The Making of an American Senate: Reconstitutive Change in Congress, 1787–1841. U. of Michigan Press, 1996.
- Wirls, Daniel and Wirls, Stephen. The Invention of the United States Senate (Johns Hopkins UP, 2004) excerpt
- Zelizer, Julian E. On Capitol Hill: The Struggle to Reform Congress and its Consequences, 1948–2000 (2006) online

=== Biographical ===
- American National Biography (1999) 24 volumes plus 2 supplements; contains scholarly biographies of all politicians no longer alive; online
- Baker, Richard A.. and Roger H. Davidson, eds. First Among Equals: Outstanding Senate Leaders of the Twentieth Century (1992).
- Ashby, LeRoy and Gramer, Rod. Fighting the Odds: The Life of Senator Frank Church. (Washington State U. Press, 1994). Chair of Foreign Relations in the 1970s; Democrat of Idaho
- Barnard, Harry. Independent Man: The Life of Senator James Couzens (Wayne State University Press, 2002), of Michigan.
- Becnel, Thomas A. Senator Allen Ellender of Louisiana: A Biography. (Louisiana State U. Press, 1995). Democrat online
- Caro, Robert A. Master of the Senate: The Years of Lyndon Johnson Vol. 3 (Vintage, 2009).
- Farrell, John A. Ted Kennedy: A Life (2022) Democrat of Massachusetts
- Fite, Gilbert. Richard B. Russell, Jr., Senator from Georgia (1991) powerful Democrat; online
- Garraty, John A. Henry Cabot Lodge, a biography (1953), Republican of Massachusetts online
- Goldberg, Robert Alan. Barry Goldwater (1995), Rep;ublican of Arizona
- Herman, Arthur. Joseph McCarthy: Reexamining the Life and Legacy of America's Most Hated Senator (Simon and Schuster, 2000), Republican of Wisconsin.
- Houston, G. David. "A Negro Senator." Journal of Negro History 7.3 (1922): 243-256. online; Blanche Bruce Republican of Mississippi
- Johnson, Claudius O. Borah of Idaho (1936) online, Republican
- Johnson, Marc C. Political Hell-Raiser: The Life and Times of Senator Burton K. Wheeler of Montana (University of Oklahoma Press, 2019); Democrat
- Keith, Caroline H. For Hell and a Brown Mule: The Biography of Senator Millard E. Tydings (Madison Books, 1991), Democrat of Maryland
- Laymon, Sherry. Fearless: John L McClellan, United States Senator (2022), Democrat of Arkansas
- Lower, Richard Coke. A Bloc of One: The Political Career of Hiram W. Johnson (Stanford University Press, 1993); Republican of California.
- McFarland, Ernest W. The Ernest W. McFarland Papers: The United States Senate Years, 1940–1952. (Prescott, Ariz.: Sharlot Hall Museum, 1995). Democratic majority leader 1950–1952; of Arizona
- Mann, Robert. The Walls of Jericho: Lyndon Johnson, Hubert Humphrey, Richard Russell and the Struggle for Civil Rights. (Harcourt Brace, 1996).
- Miller, G. Wayne. An Uncommon Man: The Life & Times of Senator Claiborne Pell (UPNE, 2011) Democrat of Rhode Island.
- Norris, George W. Fighting Liberal: The Autobiography of George W. Norris (U of Nebraska Press, 1992) Republican of Nebraska. online
  - Fellman, David. "The Liberalism of Senator Norris." American Political Science Review 40.1 (1946): 27-51. online
- Palermo, Joseph A. In His Own Right: The Political Odyssey of Senator Robert F. Kennedy (Columbia UP, 2002) Democrat of New York.
- Patterson, James T. Mr. Republican; a biography of Robert A. Taft (1972) online
- Price, Christopher. "Peace and Progress: The Life and Political Contributions of Senator Jennings Randolph." West Virginia History: A Journal of Regional Studies 14.2 (2020): 1-27. Democrat of West Virginia
- O'Brien, Michael. Philip Hart: The Conscience of the Senate. (Michigan State U. Press 1995) Democrat of Michigan.
- Rice, Ross R. Carl Hayden: Builder of the American West (U. Press of America, 1993). Chair of Appropriations in the 1960s and 1970s; Democrat of Arizona.
- Stephenson, Nathaniel W. Nelson W. Aldrich: A Leader in American Politics (1930), powerful Republican from Rhode Island
- Valeo, Frank. Mike Mansfield, Majority Leader: A Different Kind of Senate, 1961–1976 (Sharpe, 1999). Senate majority leader. Democrat Of Montana.
- Weller, Cecil Edward, Jr. Joe T. Robinson: Always a Loyal Democrat. U. of Arkansas Press, 1998. Majority leader in the 1930s; of Arkansas.
- Winston, Mitch. Senator Daniel Inouye: WW II Hero and America Finest Senator (2022), Democrat of Hawaii

=== Official Senate histories (and reviews) ===
- Byrd, Robert C. (1993). Hall, Mary Sharon "Sherry"; Wolff, Wendy (eds.). The Senate, 1789–1989 – Addresses on the History of the United States Senate (Congressional Bicentennial ed.). U.S. Government Printing Office. 100th Congress, 1st Session → Senate Document 100–20 H.Con.Res. 18; LCCN 88-24545; ISBN 0-1600-6405-8, 978-0-1600-6405-0; OCLC 18442225 (all editions).
  - Hall (ed.). Vol. 1 – a chronological series of addresses on the history of the Senate (serial no. 13723; Superintendent of Documents No. 052-071-00823-3). ISBN 0-1600-6391-4, 978-0-1600-6391-6
  - Wolff (ed.). Vol. 2 – a topical series of addresses on various aspects of the Senate's operation and powers (serial no. 13724; Superintendent of Documents No. 052-071-00856-0). ISBN 0-1600-6405-8, 978-0-1600-6405-0
  - Wolff (ed.). Vol. 3 – Classic Speeches, 1830–1993 (serial no. 13725; Superintendent of Documents No. 052-071-01048-3).
  - Wolff (ed.). Vol. 4 – Historical Statistics, 1789–1992 (serial no. 13726; Superintendent of Documents No. 052-071-00995-7).
- Video. Senator Robert Byrd (interviewee); Brian Lamb (April 7, 1989). "Book Review: The Senate: 1789–1989". C-Span program → Booknotes (online from a VHS tape). OCLC 34512820.
- Bob Dole. Historical Almanac of the United States Senate. (stock number 052-071-00857-8).
- Video. Senator Bob Dole (interviewee); Brian Lamb. "Book Review: Historical Almanac of the U.S. Senate". C-Span program → Booknotes (recorded August 7, 1990; broadcast September 9, 1990). OCLC 831351741.
- Biographical Directory of the United States Congress, 1774–1989, (stock number 052-071-00699-1)
- Mark O. Hatfield, with the Senate Historical Office. Vice Presidents of the United States, 1789–1993. (stock number 052-071-01227-3); essays reprinted online
- The United States Senate
