= Slavery and the United States Constitution =

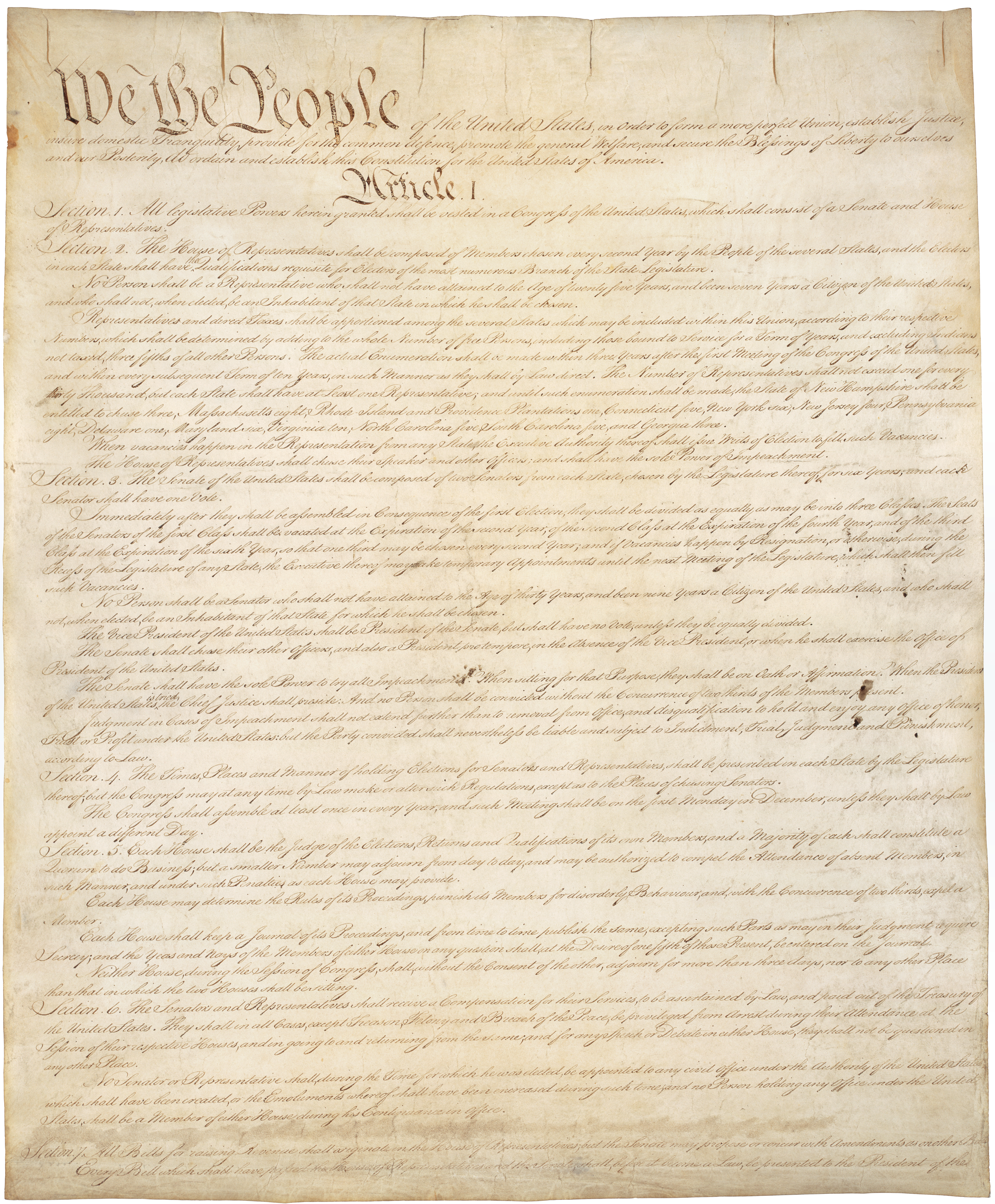
Constitution of the United States

Although the original United States Constitution did not contain the words "slave" or "slavery" within its text, it dealt directly with American slavery in at least five of its provisions and indirectly protected the institution elsewhere in the document. Two constitutional amendments contain the word "slavery" or "slave".

== Constitutional provisions dealing directly with slavery ==
- Three-Fifths Clause (Article I, section 2, clause 3). This provision counted three-fifths of each state's slave population toward that state's total population for the purpose of apportioning the House of Representatives, giving the Southern states more power in the House and in the Electoral College than if slaves were not counted, because Article II, section 1, provides that the number of electors from each state is equal to that state's number of senators (two) plus its number of representatives.
- Slave Trade Clause (Article I, section 9, paragraph 1). This provision prohibited Congress from banning the importation of slaves until 1808.
- Fugitive Slave Clause (Article IV, section 2, paragraph 3). This provision required states into which slaves escaped to return them to their owners.
- Capitation Clause (Article I, section 9, paragraph 4). "This clause declared that any 'capitation' or other 'direct tax' had to take into account the three-fifths clause".
- Article V. This article prohibited any amendment of the Slave Trade Clause or Capitation Clause before 1808.

== Constitutional provisions dealing indirectly with slavery ==
Paul Finkelman writes, "The most prominent indirect protections of slavery were the following":

- Article I. Section 8, Paragraph 15. The domestic insurrections clause empowered Congress to call "forth the Militia" to "suppress Insurrections," including slave rebellions.
- Article I. Section 9, Paragraph 5. This clause prohibited federal taxes on exports and thus prevented an indirect tax on slavery by taxing the staple products of slave labor, such as tobacco, rice, and eventually cotton.
- Article I, Section 10, Paragraph 2. This clause prohibited the states from taxing exports or imports, thus preventing an indirect tax on the products of slave labor by a non-slaveholding state.
- Article II. Section 1, Paragraph 2. This clause provided for the indirect election of the president through an electoral college based on congressional representation. This provision incorporated the three-fifths clause into the electoral college and gave whites in slave states a disproportionate influence in the election of the president.
- Article IV, Section 3, Paragraph 1. This clause allowed for the admission of new states. The delegates to the Convention anticipated the admission of new slave states to the Union.
- Article IV, Section 4. The domestic violence provision guaranteed that the United States government would protect states from “domestic Violence,” including slave rebellions.
- Article V. By requiring a three-fourths majority of the states to ratify any amendment to the Constitution, this Article ensured that the slaveholding states would have a perpetual veto over any constitutional changes.

== Background ==
At the time of the drafting of the Constitution in 1787 and its ratification in 1789, slavery was banned by the states in New England and Pennsylvania and was banned in the Northwest Territory by the Northwest Ordinance of 1787, which was enacted by the Congress of the Confederation. Though slaves were present in other states, most were forced to work in the South, in agriculture.

According to H. W. Brands, because of the declining productivity of crops like tobacco due to soil exhaustion, many of the drafters of the Constitution assumed that slavery would die out naturally in the South as it had done in the industrialized North. This changed with the invention of the modern cotton gin in 1793, which provided a more sustainable and economically viable crop for Southern plantations.

== Historical debate ==
Throughout U.S. history there have been disputes about whether the Constitution was proslavery or antislavery. In the antebellum era, William Lloyd Garrison and Wendell Phillips, for example, viewed it as proslavery, whereas Lysander Spooner, in The Unconstitutionality of Slavery, and Charles Sumner, in his speech "Freedom National; Slavery Sectional", responded that it was antislavery. Garrison burned a copy of the Constitution, condemning it as "a Covenant with Death, an Agreement with Hell".

James Oakes writes that the Constitution's Fugitive Slave Clause and Three-Fifths Clause "might well be considered the bricks and mortar of the proslavery Constitution". "But", Oakes adds, "there was also an antislavery Constitution.... Congress was granted the power to make 'all needful rules and regulations' for the territories, and for decades after ratification hardly anyone doubted that this authorized the federal government to ban slavery from the territories.... Then there was the familiar assertion that the principle of fundamental human equality was embodied in the Constitution.... Doesn't the Preamble state that the purpose of the federal government was to 'secure the blessings of liberty' ... ? Similarly, the Fifth Amendment declares that 'no person' could be deprived of life, liberty, or property without due process of law." The Fifth Amendment, however, was a two-edged sword. In Dred Scott v. Sandford, Chief Justice Roger B. Taney held that "the right of property in a slave is distinctly and expressly affirmed in the Constitution".

Oakes continues: "Throughout the decades-long debate over slavery and the Constitution some of the most contentious issues arose over constitutional principles that cannot be found in the actual wording of the Constitution. Nowhere does the Constitution state that Congress cannot 'interfere' with slavery or abolition in a state, yet it was widely agreed that it could not. Nor does the Constitution expressly recognize a right of 'property in man'.... Given that the Constitution was the handiwork of men who disagreed about slavery, it is hardly surprising that it could be—and was—read as both proslavery and antislavery." Oakes' view is that, "depending on which clauses you cite and how you spin them, the Constitution can be read as either proslavery or antislavery".

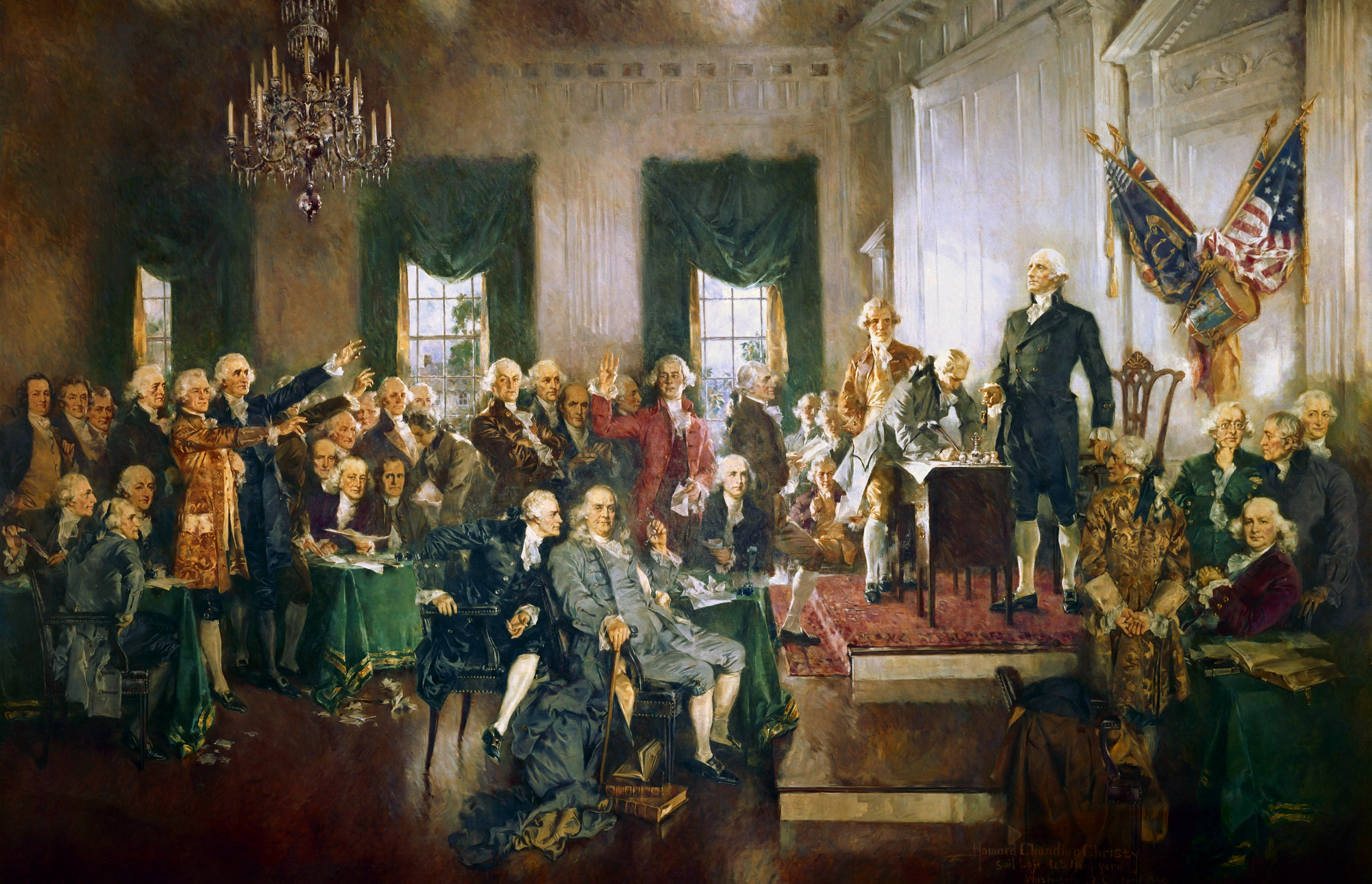
George Washington presiding the Philadelphia Convention

The issue of slavery may have played a role in the omission of a bill of rights in the original version of the U.S. Constitution that came out of the 1787 Constitutional Convention. Richard Primus explains the Framers' dilemma: "Drafting a bill of rights for the entire Union would have required choosing between those rival formulations, and any choice would have risked pointed conflict—conflict that might have prevented the Convention from reaching agreement on the Constitution." He highlights the stark contrasts between northern and southern states regarding their bills of rights. Northern states, such as Massachusetts, used universalistic language affirming freedom and equality for all men, while southern states, like Virginia, employed restrictive language that limited rights to "freemen", thereby accommodating slavery.

The framers' conflicted stance toward slavery led them to deliberately avoid using direct language about the institution in the Constitution. While many personally opposed slavery on moral grounds, they prioritized political unity over abolition, resulting in key compromises like the Three-Fifths Clause and the Fugitive Slave Clause that protected slaveholding interests. The framers' use of euphemisms like "Person held to Service or Labour" rather than explicit references to slavery reflected their attempt to sidestep moral confrontation while preserving the institution.

The economic and political realities of slavery also made substantive action impossible during the Constitutional Convention. According to historian Paul Finkelman, the South's complete economic dependence on slavery meant that "the southern economy's reliance on slavery made it politically impossible for the Framers to abolish the institution." These constitutional compromises not only entrenched slavery but also created, as Finkelman highlights, "a moral and legal crisis that would fester for decades," ultimately contributing to the coming of the Civil War.

In addition to the Three-Fifths Clause and the Fugitive Slave Clause, the Constitution also prohibited Congress, until 1808, from banning the "Importation" of slaves from outside the United States. These measures ensured that slavery remained a national issue rather than a purely state-level concern, embedding it deeper into the fabric of American governance.

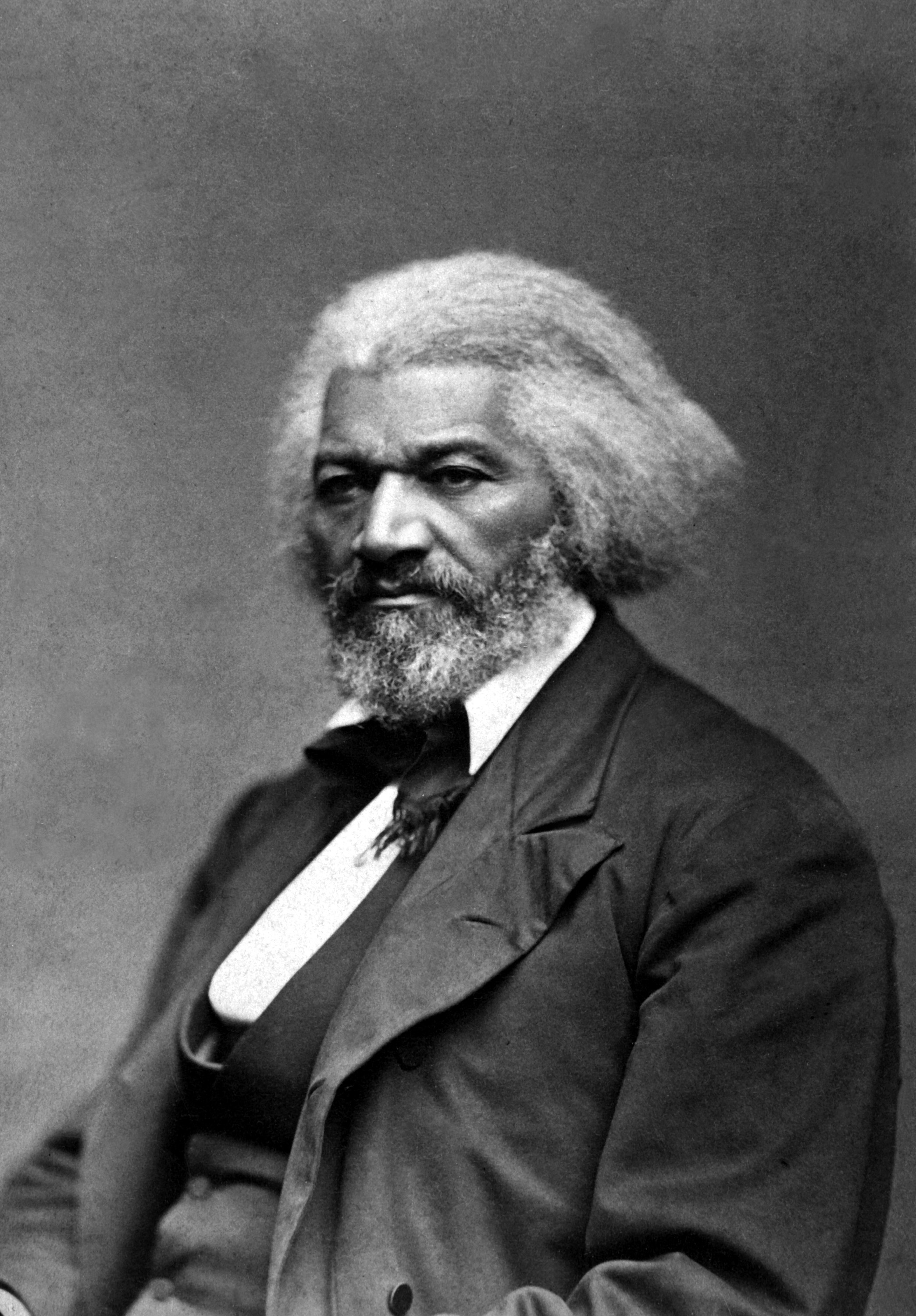
Fredrick Douglass

== Frederick Douglass ==
Although Frederick Douglass had earlier been an ally of William Lloyd Garrison in criticizing the Constitution as proslavery, Douglass's 1860 speech in Glasgow, Scotland, "The Constitution of the United States: is it pro-slavery or anti-slavery?", represented his later view. In the speech, Douglass cites the Notes of Debates in the Federal Convention of 1787 left behind by James Madison in order to describe four provisions of the Constitution that are said to be proslavery. In examining the history of how the clauses were debated and structured, he argues either that they are not pro-slavery or that they do not concern slavery.

He argues that the Three-Fifths Clause (Article I, section 2) "'encourages freedom' because the southern states would gain more representation in Congress and the Electoral College if they abolished slavery"; that the Migration or Importation Clause (Article I, section 9) allowed Congress to end the importation of slaves from Africa in 1808; that the Fugitive Slave Clause (Article IV, section 2) does not apply to slaves but rather to "Person[s] held to Service or Labour", which do not include slaves, because a slave "is a simple article of property. He does not owe and cannot owe service. He cannot even make a contract"; and that the clause giving Congress the power to "suppress Insurrections" (Article I, section 8) gives Congress the power to end slavery "[i]f it should turn out that slavery is a source of insurrection, [and] that there is no security from insurrection while slavery lasts...."

== See also ==
- Three-fifths Compromise
- Act Prohibiting Importation of Slaves
- Fugitive Slave Act of 1793
- Fugitive Slave Act of 1850
- Dred Scott v. Sandford
- Thirteenth Amendment to the United States Constitution
- Abolitionism in the United States
- The Constitution of the United States: is it pro-slavery or anti-slavery?, by Frederick Douglass
- Slavery in the United States
- Peonage
- Slavery and the United States Founding Fathers
- Abraham Lincoln and slavery
- The Unconstitutionality of Slavery
- Personal liberty laws
