= No Treason =

1867 book by Lysander Spooner

- Title page of No. 1.
- Author: Lysander Spooner
- Language: English
- Subject: Political philosophy
- Publisher: Self-published
- Publication date: 1867–1870
- Publication place: United States
- Text: No Treason at Wikisource

No Treason is a composition of three essays by Lysander Spooner, an American individualist anarchist, all written in 1867: No. 1, No. 2: "The Constitution", and No. 6: "The Constitution of No Authority". No essays between No. 2 and No. 6 were ever published under the authorship of Spooner.

== Overview ==
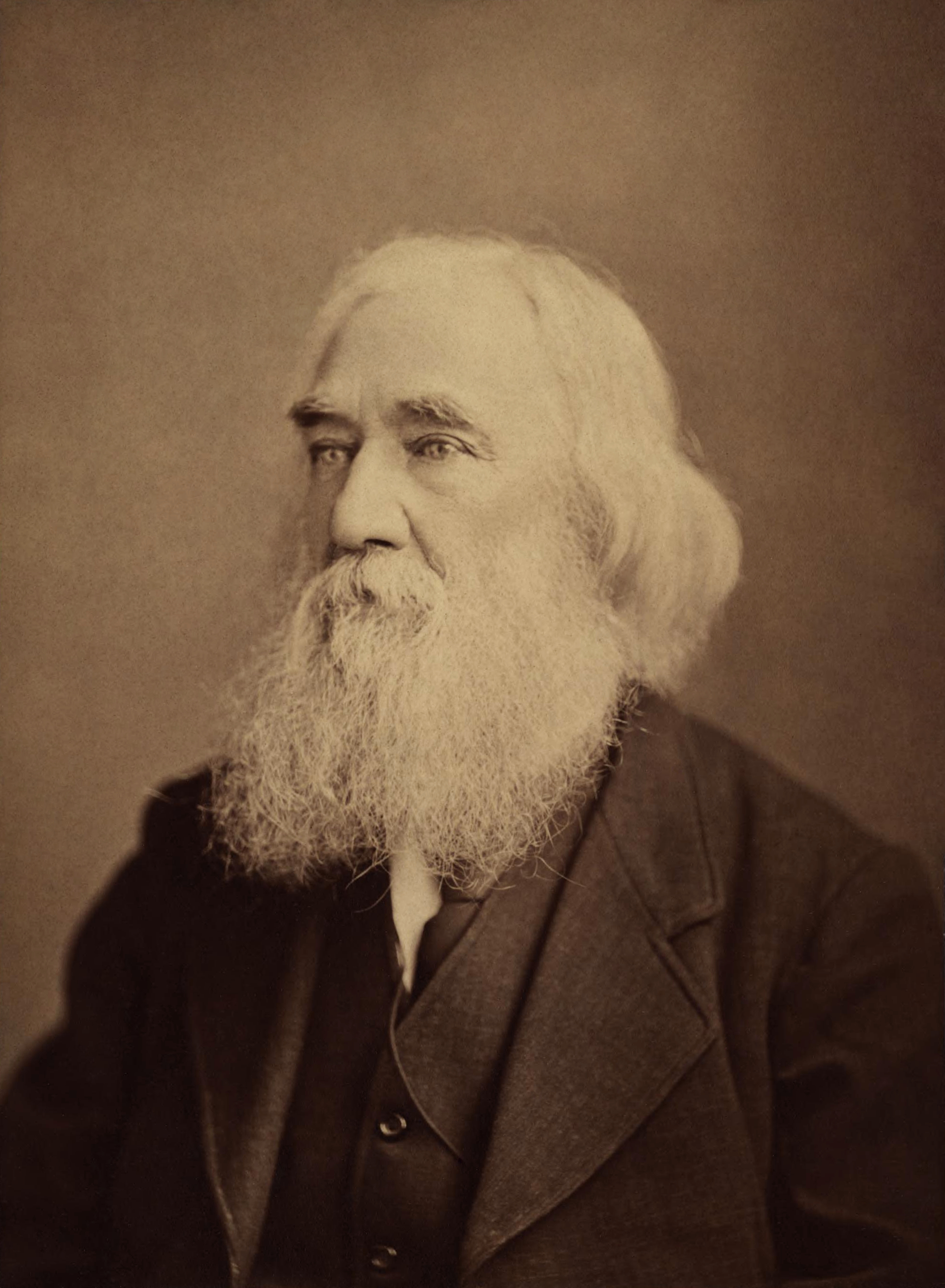
Lysander Spooner by Amory Nelson Hardy

A lawyer by training, a strong abolitionist, radical thinker, and individualist anarchist, Spooner wrote these specific pamphlets to express his discontent with the state and its legitimizing documents in the United States, the U.S. Constitution. He strongly believed in the idea of natural law, which he also described as "the science of justice" and called "the science of all human rights; of all man's rights of person and property; of all his rights to life, liberty, and the pursuit of happiness".

As Spooner saw it, natural law was to be part of everyone's life, including the rights given at birth: life, liberty, and the pursuit of happiness. The Framers of the U.S. government also saw natural law as a sound basis for creating the Constitution. Its preamble implies that the powers of the U.S. government come from "the People". Spooner believed that "if there be such a principle as justice, or natural law, it is the principle, or law, that tells us what rights were given to every human being at his birth". This means that Spooner believed that everyone has the same rights from birth, regardless of color or sex or state decree.

Being against the American Civil War as being about conquest when it should have been about slavery in the United States and witnessing the hardships brought along by the Reconstruction Era, Spooner felt the Constitution completely violated natural law, and thus was voided. By allowing for the institution of slavery to take place, the United States was taking away the fundamental rights of the many enslaved people who were born on American soil. According to Spooner, an enslaved person's rights were to be the same as everyone else's due to their birth qualifications. As an outspoken abolitionist, Spooner did not believe that any American should be treated differently under the natural law.

In the years before writing No Treason, Lysander Spooner had already expressed his disapproval of slavery in his essay The Unconstitutionality of Slavery (1845, 1860), considered by many American abolitionists of his time a "comprehensive, libertarian theory of constitutional interpretation". His main argument fell under the idea that the Constitution did not mention slavery. He wrote:

"The constitution itself contains no designation, description, or necessary admission of the existence of such a thing as slavery, servitude, or the right of property in man. We are obliged to go out of the instrument and grope among the records of oppression, lawlessness and crime – records unmentioned, and of course unsanctioned by the constitution – to find the thing, to which it is said that the words of the constitution apply. And when we have found this thing, which the constitution dare not name, we find that the constitution has sanctioned it (if at all) only by enigmatical words, by unnecessary implication and inference, by innuendo and double entendre, and under a name that entirely fails of describing the thing."

While each of Spooner's three essays claims voidance of the Constitution, each focuses on specific aspects.

== No Treason No. 1 ==
=== Summary ===
"The question of treason is distinct from that of slavery; and is the same that it would have been, if free States, instead of slave States, had seceded. On the part of the North, the war was carried on, not to liberate the slaves, but by a government that had always perverted and violated the Constitution, to keep the slaves in bondage; and was still willing to do so, if the slaveholders could thereby [be] induced to stay in the Union. The principle, on which the war was waged by the North, was simply this: That men may rightfully be compelled to submit to, and support, a government that they do not want; and that resistance, on their part, makes them traitors and criminals."

Spooner's first pamphlet starts by questioning the reasons for the Civil War, as it was justified under the idea of unity among the citizens of the United States; however, he believed slavery was more critical and found it outrageous that the North allowed the institution of slavery by not finding ways of ending it in the South. He makes comments on the funding of the Civil War by the North and questions the idea of consent directly stated under the Constitution. He finds problems with the Constitution indicating that it has been created under everyone's consent, "the people's" consent. Spooner acknowledges that total consent is impossible in a democratic government and mentions the separation of majorities and minorities. Additionally, Spooner questions how majority influence may have had more impact on the creation of the nation instead of everyone, asking once more about the idea of consent and what makes a nation under consent.

=== Text ===
Written in 1867 as the shortest of the three essays, No Treason No.1 introduces Spooner's idea of the non-validity of the U.S. Constitution. He begins this work with a brief introduction about the relationship between slavery and the Civil War as viewed by the North. First, Spooner argues that the North was involved with slavery by simply allowing for its institution to take place in the South for the Southern states to remain part of the Union. He then quickly moves to discuss the actual war and how many Americans were not in agreement with the decisions of the U.S. government or its ideals, which triggered a desire for secession. Spooner mentioned that those who were non-accepting of the government of the United States faced a type of slavery. While not going under physical slavery, these men had to abide by the rules of the land which denied them "ownership of themselves and the products of their labor".

If those who are against the state were to do something about it, they could be deemed traitors, which Spooner does not feel to be a fair response from the government. The fact that many Americans disagreed with the U.S. government questions the idea of unanimous consent. Because of this belief that not everyone will always be in absolute agreement with government decisions, Spooner argues "the Constitution itself should be at once overthrown", and proceeds to support his claim.

Section 1 mentions the justification given by the North for its participation in the Civil War: to maintain the union of the country, both North and South. Because the people consented to separate from the power of England, and the same concept is part of the foundations for the Constitution, the North could participate in the Civil War while affecting the lives of thousands and spending millions of dollars. Spooner is outraged that the state claims to act in the name of liberty and a free government and questions the idea of consent to it himself.

Section 2 then poses the question: "What, then, is implied in a government's resting on consent?" In this section, Spooner expands on his questioning of consent and whether it truly exists. He earlier challenged this idea with the Civil War since it is not "consistent for the North to wage war for government based on consent to make the South live under the rule of a government it does not want"; however, the war's outcome introduces the idea of a majority containing consent over everyone. This poses a problem, as the Constitution states that its creation was based on everyone's consent, therefore everyone should have a say in what goes on with the state. With that in mind, Spooner expresses his argument against consent to the majority in seven points that act as closing arguments for this specific section:

1. A man's natural right is his own, therefore no one should try to impose authority over him.
2. It is unacceptable for the majority to create a government over the minority. There needs to be equality of thought and opinion regardless of numbers.
3. The Constitution does not mention that the majority created it but by "the people", meaning everyone.
4. The Forefathers did not claim that majorities should rule, for they were a minority.
5. Majority rule does not guarantee a just decision.
6. If a government is established by force and with the support of a majority, such members have fallen under ignorance and corruption.
7. Allowing a majority to have power over a minority creates a contest of ideas between members of each group.

Section 3 questions how a nation comes into existence and what is the justification of why the United States remains a nation. Spooner wonders: "By what right, then, did we become 'a nation?' By what right do we continue to be 'a nation?' And by why right do either the strongest, or the most numerous, party, now existing within the territorial limits, called 'The United States,' claim that there really is such 'a nation' as the United States?" The idea of a majority vote and the influence of the majority is engraved in this section, as well as that of consent. Spooner mentions how consent resides within each person and that numbers should not dictate who starts entities such as political groups. Therefore, for a government to work, consent must be obtained from the people.

Section 4 then restates the question, "What is implied in a government resting on consent?" Spooner looks at the direct role of consent in decision-making in government and how members of a government who live under consent do so by participating in voting, taxation, or any personal service. The problem with equating consent with any participation for the state, Spooner argues, cannot be fully achieved because not everyone necessarily agrees with the ways of showing consent or even with the ideas provided by the government. The pamphlet asks: what happens to the people who are not in agreement with the forms of showing consent? What happens to the people who do not believe in the ideals that established the United States? According to the law, it means treason. Spooner explains: "Clearly this individual consent is indispensable to the idea of treason; for if a man has never consented or agreed to support a government, he breaks no faith in refusing to support it. And if he makes war upon it, he does so as an open enemy, and not as a traitor that is, as a betrayer, or treacherous friend." Spooner's concern with treason is that the act of not accepting the ideas of the government should not allow for that person to be considered a traitor.

His most significant example is that of the American Revolution against Britain. Just like many Americans were not fond of the British Crown, many newly established Americans disagreed with the doctrine of the newly formed American government; however, when the men and women who lived under the rule of the British Crown decided to express their thoughts and act as individuals, their consent was present by not allowing the rule of Britain to take over their lives and proceeding to revolt against the British Empire. Spooner writes: "It was, therefore, as individuals, and only as individuals, each acting for himself alone, that they declared that their consent that is, their individual consent for each one could consent only for himself—was necessary to the creation or perpetuity of any government that they could rightfully be called to support." Spooner shows that individualism is paramount, as it allows new ideas to emerge that can actually help the government; at the same time, the problem with individualism is that it can also isolate membership from the government, which the United States does not desire. Still, Spooner does not believe that treason should be alleged when one is open about their opinion. In closing the section, Spooner examines the idea of voluntary belonging to political parties and groups. He argues that it is a natural right to belong where one desires and that this right allows for direct, indirect, or no government involvement. As long as there is no imminent danger because of one's beliefs against the government, everyone's voice should be respected.

== No Treason No. 6 ==
The Constitution of No Authority by Spooner, a lawyer, starts by examining its potential validity as a binding contract, observing that the U.S. Constitution could have no inherent, lasting authority except as a contract between men and that it only claims to be one between the people existing when it was written. Quoting the famous preamble of the Constitution, Spooner then says that though it cites "posterity", it does not claim any power to bind that posterity. He then compares the Constitution's authority to a corporation: the corporation can exist past the lifespan of its original owners but only by people taking ownership of it voluntarily over time, not by some forced ownership by descendants. Additionally, he observes that even if voting counts as voluntarily taking ownership, only about one-sixth of Americans (at that time, when slavery had just ended and women could not vote) had historically been allowed to vote. Even then, only those who voted for an American politician could be said to have consented to the Constitution, not those who voted against, and only for the period he voted for (every two years, for example).

Spooner argues that even voting is not consensual because each potential voter is faced with the choice of either voting, which makes him a master of others, or abstaining, which makes him a slave of those who do vote. Those whose supported candidate loses can't really be considered to have bindingly supported the Constitution, as they lost, and anyway, some may vote specifically with the intent of undermining the Constitution. He then tallies all people who might claim to support the Constitution, making a case for why each general grouping does not actually support it or have the capacity for informed consent. For example, those who would use it for legal plunder and those who do not really understand it, or else they would not support it. Spooner states that taxes cannot be claimed as proof of consent because they are compulsory and, therefore, not consensual. He says that an honest robber does not claim to be protecting you or impose his will upon you after receipt of your money. He describes the government as a group of dishonest robbers who will not rob you directly but will secretly appoint one of their members to come and rob you in their name, going on to describe a typical protection racket. He then describes a scenario in which people who resist subjugation might be killed, even by the hundreds of thousands. Written in 1867, this reflects the United States's reconquest of the Confederate States of America. Spooner was an outspoken abolitionist (writing The Unconstitutionality of Slavery in 1845) and advocate of universal freedom and natural rights. Still, he had been horrified by the brutality of the war and the lack of a legitimate constitutional basis for violently conquering people who wanted to leave a federation that had been consensually joined only by their ancestors.
