= Personal liberty laws =

U.S. state laws protecting defendants under the Fugitive Slave Clause

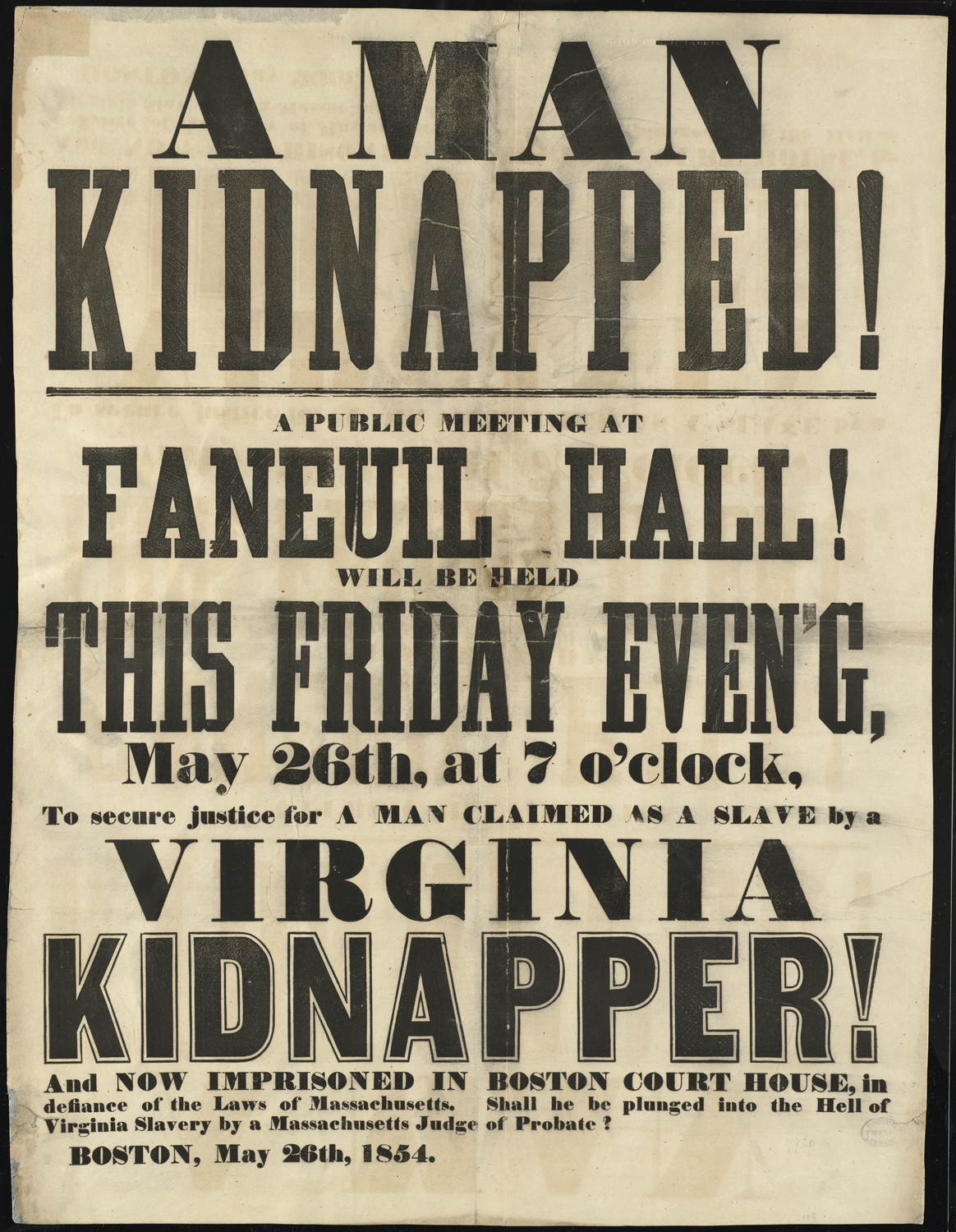
Broadside (1854) advertising the abduction of Anthony Burns under the Fugitive Slave Act of 1850

Free state legislatures enacted personal liberty laws in response to the Fugitive Slave Acts of 1793 and 1850. Laws typically guaranteed due process to freedom seekers and restricted the use of state resources to assist slave catchers. The statutes were a major source of legal and political controversy, fueling conflict between slave states and free states in the decades preceding the American Civil War.

Despite the gradual abolition of slavery in the Northern United States after 1777, the Fugitive Slave Clause permitted enslavers to seize freedom seekers who travelled to the free states and return them to slavery. Following the 1791 kidnapping of John Davis, a freedman emancipated by Pennsylvania's gradual abolition law, the United States Congress passed the first federal fugitive slave law to regulate the rendition of freedom seekers under the Constitution of the United States. Because Congress did not protect the right of defendants to testify or call witnesses on their behalf, the law in effect allowed kidnappers to enslave any Black person based solely on the testimony of an enslaver. During the first half of the nineteenth century, free states legislated to penalize kidnapping, establish new procedural hurdles for enslavers seeking to re-enslave freedom seekers, and prohibit local officials from enforcing the Fugitive Slave Clause. In Prigg v. Pennsylvania, the Supreme Court of the United States overturned parts of Pennsylvania's personal liberty law but ruled that state officials could not be required to enforce the federal law. The Fugitive Slave Act of 1850, which significantly expanded the federal government's enforcement efforts, led to the adoption of new personal liberty laws in New England and the Upper Midwest.

Abolitionists advocated personal liberty as part of a broad antislavery constitutionalism that challenged the majority view of the U.S. Constitution as a proslavery document. During the 1850s, Republican politicians invoked states' rights to defend the principle of non-cooperation with federal law enforcement. The laws were an important influence on the Fourteenth Amendment to the United States Constitution that was central to the Reconstruction era civil rights movement.

== History ==
=== Early Republic, 1780–1849 ===
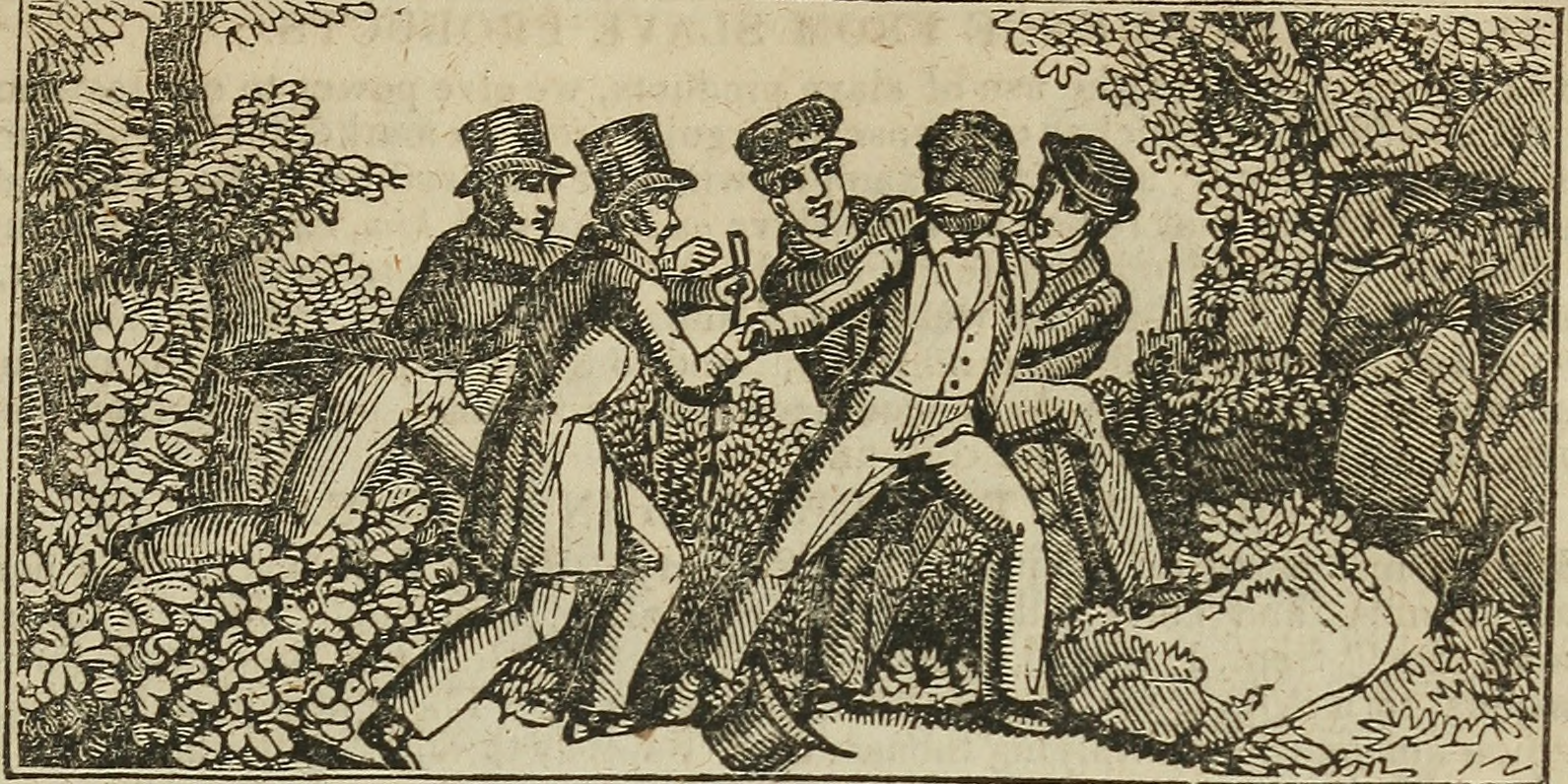
Detail from the American Anti-Slavery Almanac (1839) depicting the kidnapping of Peter John Lee, a free Black resident of Westchester County, New York, in 1837

The prevalence of kidnapping was noted by Congress as early as 1799. Massachusetts and Pennsylvania had enacted personal liberty laws which predated the Fugitive Slave Clause. The Massachusetts law included enslaved and free people of color under the state's general habeas corpus protections. In Pennsylvania, where enslavers used various means to circumvent the 1780 gradual abolition law, the 1788 act was designed specifically to prevent kidnappings of free Black residents. The act prohibited the removal of Black residents from the state without their consent and set the penalty for kidnapping at six months hard labor and a £100 fine. While the act made no distinction between free and enslaved residents, a 1795 ruling by the Supreme Court of Pennsylvania found that the law did not prevent the removal of freedom seekers under the Fugitive Slave Act.

Article 6 of the Northwest Ordinance, which outlawed slavery in the Northwest Territory except as a punishment for crime, made the region a haven for freedom seekers and free Black settlers. In 1810, the legislature of the Indiana Territory required enslavers to prove the identity of defendants before removing them from the territory; non-compliance with the law was punishable with a $1,000 fine. Following statehood, the first elected governor of Indiana Jonathan Jennings called for legislation to strengthen anti-kidnapping protections in his first annual message to the Indiana General Assembly. The 1816 Act to Prevent Manstealing mandated jury trials in cases arising under the Fugitive Slave Clause; enslavers were required to obtain an arrest warrant, and a sheriff or constable, not the enslaver or their agent, would make the arrest.

Efforts to pass a federal personal liberty law or modify the 1793 Fugitive Slave Act were defeated by proslavery lawmakers during the 1810s. Following the Missouri Crisis, states in the Northeastern United States passed new legislation to protect their free Black populations from kidnappers. Pennsylvania's 1826 statute became a model for much of the subsequent legislation. The act provided that the testimony of enslavers or other interested parties could not be used as evidence in preliminary hearings and required the plaintiff to pay court costs, in addition to mandating arrest warrants and jury trials in cases involving freedom seekers. New York and Vermont required that defendants in fugitive slave cases be assigned public defenders.

Pennsylvania's law was challenged in 1842, when the U.S. Supreme Court overturned the conviction of Edward Prigg for the kidnapping of Margaret Morgan and her children. Ruling for the majority, Justice Joseph Story found that enslavers had an absolute right to recapture freedom seekers anywhere in the United States. States had no authority to interfere with enforcement of the Fugitive Slave Clause, but could refuse to assist enforcement efforts. Free states responded to the ruling in Prigg v. United States by specifically prohibiting local officials from cooperating with enslavers. In Pennsylvania, Connecticut, Rhode Island, Massachusetts, Vermont, and New Hampshire, judges were forbidden from enforcing the Fugitive Slave Act, and enslavers were denied the use of public jails to imprison freedom seekers. In these states, "the Fugitive Slave Act became a dead letter," prompting outraged enslavers to demand more vigorous federal enforcement.

=== Antebellum, 1850–60 ===
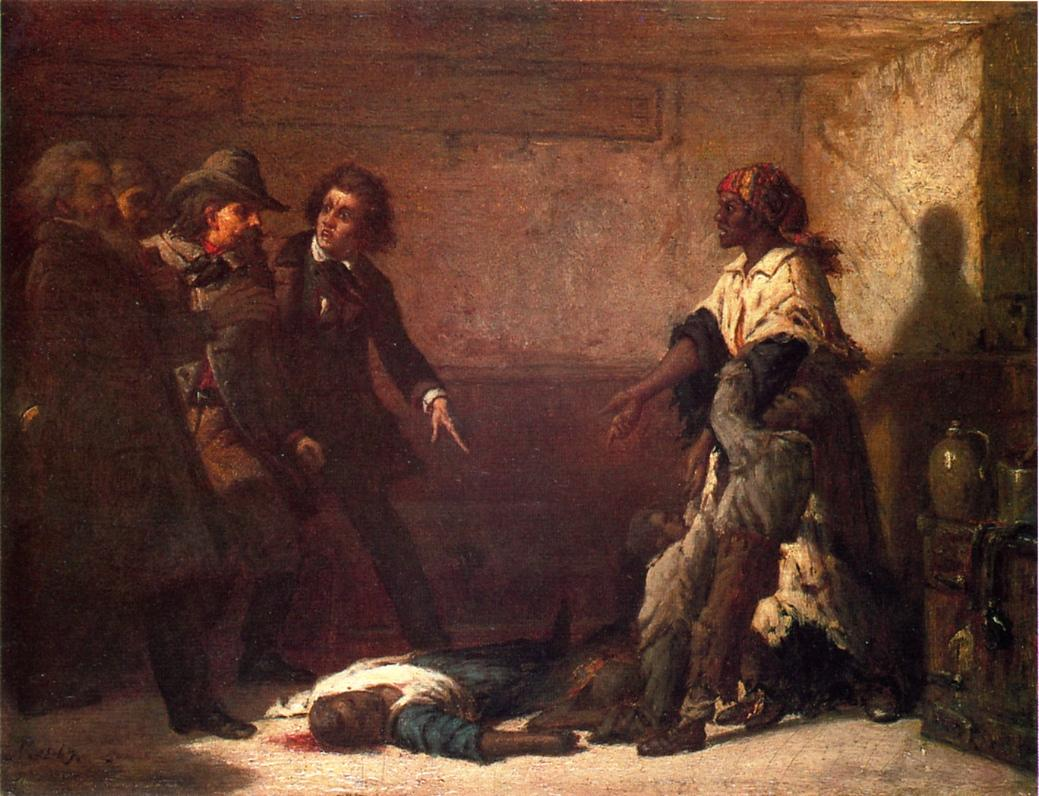
Margaret Garner (right) attempted to kill her children and herself to prevent their rendition under the Fugitive Slave Act of 1850 in a case that inspired Ohio's personal liberty law.

The 1850 Fugitive Slave Act, adopted as part of the Compromise of 1850, significantly expanded federal efforts to enforce the Fugitive Slave Clause. The act created a new class of U.S. commissioners to hear claims arising under the law; commissioners were paid $5 for every defendant freed and $10 for every person condemned to slavery, creating a financial incentive to find in favor of the enslaver. Congress empowered U.S. marshals to conscript citizens to assist in the execution of the law and made harboring or obstructing the capture of a freedom seeker punishable with up to six months' imprisonment and a $1,000 fine. The act did not include a statute of limitations, allowing longtime residents and individuals born in the free states to be charged and enslaved under the law.

The act drew outraged responses from abolitionists, who called for overwhelming resistance to render the law unenforceable. Frederick Douglass reflected the spirit of militant resistance when he told a crowd in Pittsburgh that "the only way to make the Fugitive Slave Law a dead letter is to make half a dozen or more dead kidnappers." The 1854 kidnapping of Anthony Burns and the 1856 attempted suicide and kidnapping of Margaret Garner precipitated a wave of new personal liberty laws across New England and the Upper Midwest. Between 1855 and 1857, Rhode Island, Massachusetts, Michigan, and Ohio passed legislation prohibiting the imprisonment of freedom seekers in county jails. These statutes significantly impeded enforcement of the Fugitive Slave Act, as the widespread threat of rioting made private property holders unwilling to allow their buildings to be used to imprison freedom seekers. Connecticut in 1850, followed by Massachusetts, Michigan, Ohio, Wisconsin, and Vermont, imposed penalties for kidnapping free people of color ranging from fines of $1,000 to $5,000 and one to five years' imprisonment; the Ohio law made kidnapping punishable with up to eight years' hard labor. Vermont, Massachusetts, Michigan, and Wisconsin extended the writ of habeas corpus and trial by jury to Fugitive Slave Act defendants. In these states, and in Maine, the defendant's court costs were to be paid by the state. By empowering circuit court judges to interfere directly in the rendition of freedom seekers, these acts went beyond earlier statutes in explicitly seeking to obstruct enforcement of the Fugitive Slave Clause.

New York, New Jersey, Indiana, Illinois, and Minnesota enacted no new personal liberty laws during the 1850s. Ohio's personal liberty law was repealed in 1858 after less than a year in operation, while the Pennsylvania law prohibiting the use of public jails to imprison freedom seekers was repealed in 1852. Stanley W. Campbell argues that relatively weaker resistance, combined with proximity to the slave states, allowed effective enforcement of the Fugitive Slave Act in the Lower North.

== Theory ==
=== Federalism ===
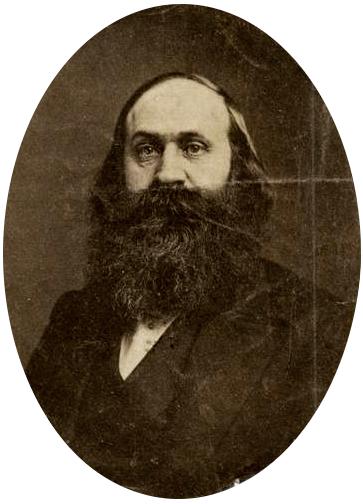
Sherman Booth, Wisconsin abolitionist, whose conviction under the Fugitive Slave Act of 1850 was overturned by the Supreme Court of Wisconsin on grounds of states' rights

Personal liberty laws raised important constitutional questions relating to federalism in the United States. State laws sought to curtail federal authority in order to protect Black residents from kidnapping or wrongful arrest. Enslavers responded with demands to increase federal jurisdiction over the rendition of freedom seekers. The 1850 Fugitive Slave Act represented the greatest expansion of federal authority to date at the expense of Northern state sovereignty.

Supreme Court precedent on the Fugitive Slave Act generally upheld a nationalist view of the Constitution that served the interests of enslavers. In Prigg v. Pennsylvania, the court interpreted the Fugitive Slave Clause as establishing an absolute right of enslavers to seize freedom seekers anywhere in the United States. The court overturned Pennsylvania's personal liberty law, finding that it unconstitutionally interfered with enforcement of the 1793 Fugitive Slave Act, but ruled that enforcement was a federal and not a state responsibility. In Ableman v. Booth, the court ruled that the Supreme Court of Wisconsin had no authority to overturn federal court precedent on the constitutionality of the Fugitive Slave Act. In both cases, federal supremacy was a necessary and effective defense of proslavery interests against antislavery state legislation.

Free states responded to the proslavery nationalism of the federal government with arguments grounded in states' rights. The Republican governor of Michigan Moses Wisner argued that Michigan, as a "sovereign and independent State," had "exclusive control" over state property and could forbid its use by federal authorities to arrest and imprison freedom seekers. In Ohio, Republicans claimed to defend "the rights of the several States as independent governments," and by 1859, the state's radical Republicans had advanced beyond noncooperation to advocate nullification of the Fugitive Slave Act. Wisconsin Republicans cited the Kentucky and Virginia Resolutions to justify resistance to the Fugitive Slave Act, and the state supreme court ruled the federal law unconstitutional. The Wisconsin State Legislature that passed the state's personal liberty law did so while declaring its "unquestionable right" to intervene on behalf of its citizens against the power of the federal government.

=== Antislavery constitutionalism ===
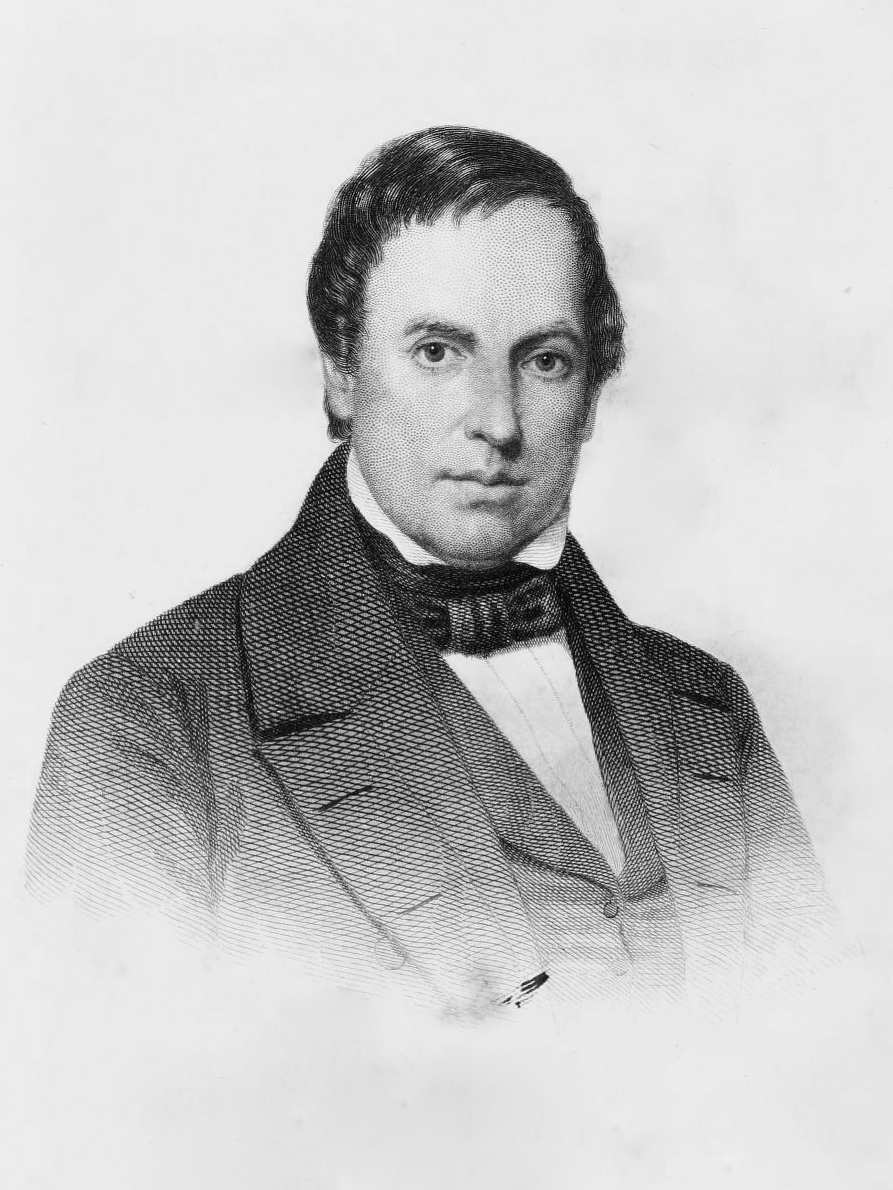
Alvan Stewart, antislavery constitutional theorist

Personal liberty laws drew on a legal theory of antislavery constitutionalism that challenged the majority view of the U.S. Constitution as a proslavery document. As early as 1837, Alvan Stewart proposed a novel reading of the Due Process Clause of the Fifth Amendment as rendering proslavery provisions of the Constitution inoperative; according to this view, Congress could abolish slavery simply by enacting declaratory legislation to such effect. Stewart's ideas influenced the Ohio Liberty Party, who adopted antislavery constitutionalism as a core defense of freedom seekers. At its most conservative, antislavery constitutionalism supported state actions to protect the due process rights of Black residents. Liberty Party leaders James G. Birney and Salmon P. Chase took the more radical position of denying the power of the federal government to in any way support the continuation of slavery.

Ohio abolitionists invoked antislavery constitutionalism in their efforts to repeal the state's fugitive slave law during the 1840s; they were finally successful in adopting three personal liberty laws in 1857. Chase's theory of the Constitution influenced defense counsel in Ableman v. Booth, who argued the 1850 Fugitive Slave Act was an unconstitutional exercise of federal power and a violation of citizens' due process rights. Others expressed skepticism of the position advocated by Chase and other political abolitionists. Recently, Jason Ross has argued that the U.S. Supreme Court's ruling in Prigg v. Pennsylvania, which overturned Pennsylvania's personal liberty law, was an important turning point in persuading Garrisonian abolitionists to abandon antislavery constitutionalism.

== Legacy ==
Free state personal liberty laws were a major sectional controversy during the 1850s. During the secession crisis preceding the American Civil War, slave state leaders demanded the repeal of the personal liberty laws as a condition for peace. Some conservative and moderate Republicans were willing to support repeal as part of a compromise to preserve the Union. A resolution supporting repeal passed the United States House of Representatives in February 1861, but the Battle of Fort Sumter ended any hope for a peaceful compromise.

Paul Finkelman argues that the personal liberty laws made an important contribution to Antebellum antislavery politics that influenced the postwar Reconstruction Amendments. Finkelman notes the involvement of Ohio radical Republicans in crafting the state's personal liberty laws who subsequently played significant roles in shaping federal Reconstruction policy. In the mid-twentieth century, Jacobus tenBroek claimed that the abolitionists' view of due process was central to the "antislavery origins" of the Fourteenth Amendment. However, Thomas D. Morris argues that the personal liberty laws "reflected ... a broad societal commitment to fundamental fairness" that extended beyond the abolitionist movement. Morris claims that this doctrine of "fairness," rather than a specifically abolitionist outlook, explains the meaning of the amendment in its nineteenth century context. More recently, Hyun Hur recontextualizes the Reconstruction Amendments as examples of personal liberty legislation at the national level. Hur argues that personal liberty rather than slavery restriction was the central concern for Ohio's radical Republicans in 1861 as a direct consequence of their experience of resistance to the Fugitive Slave Act.

== Bibliography ==
- Baker, H. Robert (2006). The Rescue of Joshua Glover: A Fugitive Slave, the Constitution, and the Coming of the Civil War. Athens: Ohio University Press.
- Campbell, Stanley W. (1970). The Slave Catchers: Enforcement of the Fugitive Slave Law, 1850–1860. Chapel Hill: University of North Carolina Press.
- Finkelman, Paul (August 1990). "The Kidnapping of John Davis and the Adoption of the Fugitive Slave Law of 1793". Journal of Southern History. 56 (3): 397–422.
- Finkelman, Paul (1994). "Story Telling on the Supreme Court: Prigg v Pennsylvania and Justice Joseph Story's Judicial Nationalism". Supreme Court Review. 1994: 247–94.
- Finkelman, Paul (2004). "The Strange Career of Race Discrimination in Antebellum Ohio". Case Western Reserve Law Review. 55 (2): 373–408.
- Foner, Eric (1971). Free Soil, Free Labor, Free Men: The Ideology of the Republican Party before the Civil War. New York: Oxford University Press.
- Foner, Philip Sheldon (1969). Frederick Douglass: A Biography. New York: Citadel Press.
- Hur, Hyun (2012). Radical Antislavery and Personal Liberty Laws in Antebellum Ohio, 1803–1857 (PDF) (PhD thesis). Madison: University of Wisconsin.
- McNitt, Ben (2021). A House Divided: Slavery and American Politics from the Constitution to the Civil War. Guilford, CT: Stackpole Books.
- McPherson, James (1988). Battle Cry of Freedom: The Civil War Era. New York: Oxford University Press.
- Morris, Thomas D. (2001). Free Men All: The Personal Liberty Laws of the North, 1780–1861. Union, NJ: Lawbook Exchange.
- Ross, Jason (Summer 2020). "William Lloyd Garrison's Shattered Faith in Antislavery Constitutionalism: The Origins and Limits of the 'Garrisonian Critique'". American Political Thought. 9 (2): 199–234.
- TenBroek, Jacobus (1965). Equal Under Law. New York: Collier Books.
- Thick, Matthew R. (2016). "'The Exploded Humbug': Antebellum Michigan, Personal Liberty Laws, and States' Rights". Michigan Historical Review. 42 (2): 53–65.
- Wiecek, William M. (1977). The Sources of Antislavery Constitutionalism in America, 1760–1848. Ithaca, NY: Cornell University Press.
