= Slavery and the United States Founding Fathers =

During and after the American Revolution, many of the Founding Fathers of the United States owned slaves and lived in a slave society. Additionally, U.S. founding documents such as the Articles of Confederation and the United States Constitution did not expressly forbid the institution of slavery.

In all, 41 of the 56 signers of the Declaration owned slaves.

== George Washington ==
George Washington had been a lifelong hereditary slave owner, inheriting 10 slaves from his father Augustine Washington when he was a boy. Eventually through further inheritance and purchase he came to own over 100 slaves at the time of his death. In accordance with his will one of his slaves was freed and the others were freed upon the death of his wife, Martha Washington.

== Charles Pinckney ==
Governor Charles Pinckney was a signer of the United States Constitution, owned several plantations in South Carolina and held dozens of slaves at each, totaling over 100.

== James Madison ==
James Madison, like George Washington, had been a lifelong hereditary slave owner. One of the wealthier Virginians, Madison at one time owned more than 100 slaves but by the time of his death owned 36, with none manumitted in his will.

== Richard Henry Lee ==
Richard Henry Lee was a planter and author of the Lee Resolution, which called for Independence to be declared. Lee owned dozens of slaves, by some accounts.

== Button Gwinnett ==
Button Gwinnett attempted several ventures during his life, one of which was the purchase of St. Catherine's Island and a large number of slaves to work the land. Because of debt, his holdings were eventually repossessed by creditors.

== Thomas Jefferson ==
Thomas Jefferson, like many other Virginia planters, was a slave owner, owning dozens of slaves at his mansion Monticello.

== Edward Rutledge ==
Edward Rutledge, at 26 years old, was the youngest of the signers of the Declaration of Independence. He studied law at university and was a landowner, owning more than 50 slaves.

== See also ==
- Slavery and the United States Constitution
