= Lysander Spooner =

American abolitionist and legal theorist (1808–1887)

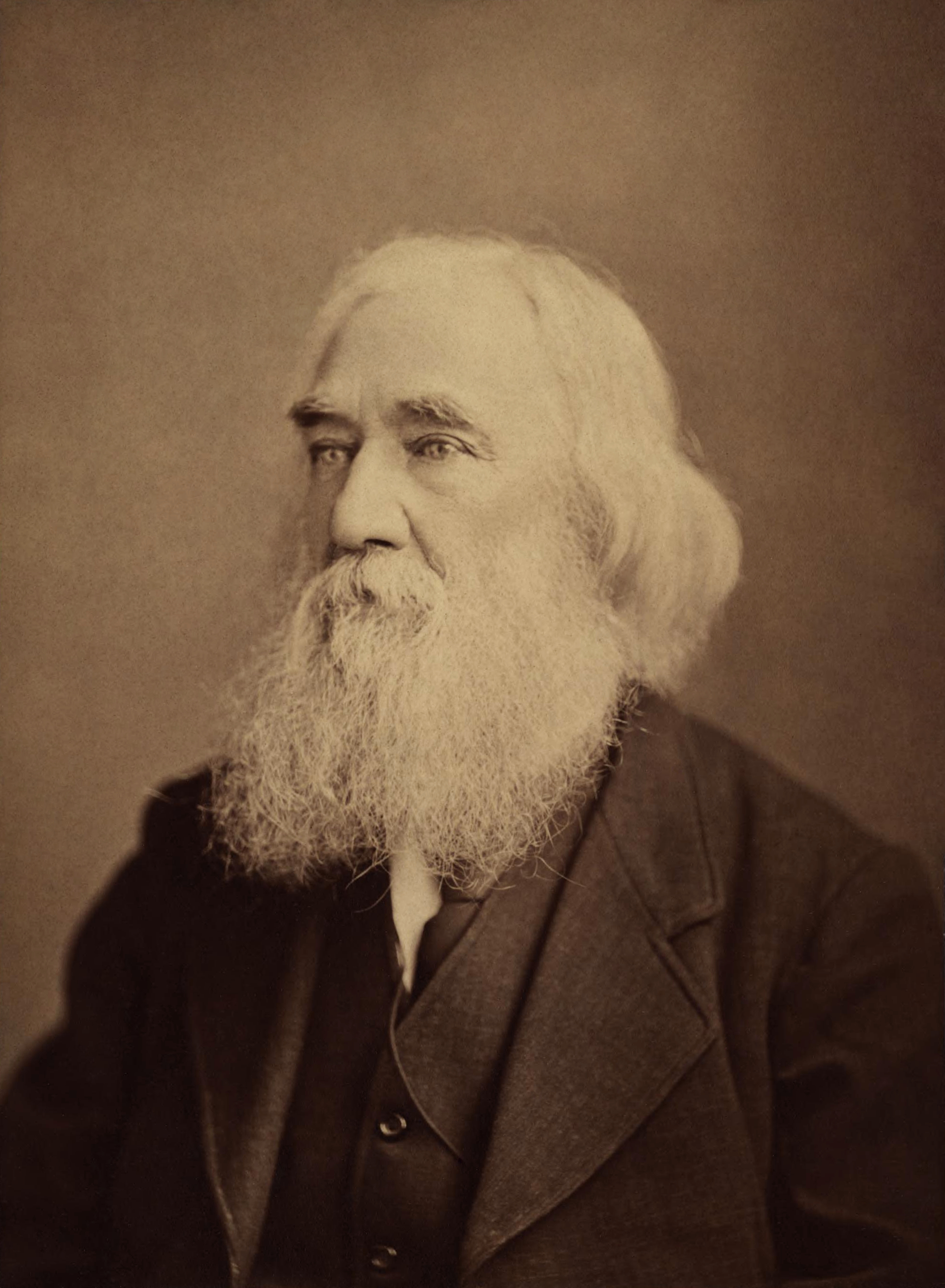
- Born: January 19, 1808; Athol, Massachusetts, U.S.
- Died: May 14, 1887 (aged 79); Boston, Massachusetts, U.S.
- Occupations: Entrepreneur, lawyer and writer
- Writing career
- Subject: Political philosophy
- Notable works: The Unconstitutionality of Slavery (1845); No Treason (1867)

Philosophical work
- Era: 19th-century philosophy
- Region: Western philosophy
- School: Iusnaturalism
- Main interests: Abolitionism; Mutual banking; Natural law; Right to property; Tax resistance

Lysander Spooner (January 19, 1808 – May 14, 1887) was an American abolitionist, entrepreneur, lawyer, essayist, natural rights legal theorist, pamphleteer, political philosopher, and writer often associated with the Boston anarchist tradition.

Spooner was a strong advocate of the labor movement and is politically identified with individualist anarchism. His writings contributed to the development of both left-libertarian and right-libertarian political theory.

Spooner's writings include the abolitionist book The Unconstitutionality of Slavery and No Treason: The Constitution of No Authority, which opposed treason charges against secessionists.

He is known for establishing the American Letter Mail Company, which competed with the United States Postal Service.

== Biography ==
=== Early life ===
Spooner was born on a farm in Athol, Massachusetts, on January 19, 1808. Spooner's parents were Asa and Dolly Spooner. One of his ancestors, William Spooner, arrived in Plymouth in 1637. Lysander was the second of nine children. His father was a deist and it has been speculated that he purposely named his two older sons Leander and Lysander after Greek mythological and Spartan heroes, respectively.

=== Legal career ===
Spooner's activism began with his career as a lawyer, which itself violated Massachusetts law. Spooner had studied law under the prominent lawyers, politicians and abolitionists John Davis, later Governor of Massachusetts and Senator; and Charles Allen, state senator and Representative from the Free Soil Party. However, he never attended college. According to the laws of the state, college graduates were required to study with an attorney for three years, while non-graduates like Lysander would be required to do so for five years.

With the encouragement from his legal mentors, Spooner set up his practice in Worcester, Massachusetts after only three years, defying the courts. He regarded the three-year privilege for college graduates as a state-sponsored discrimination against the poor (who could not afford to go to college), and viewed it as providing a monopoly income to those who met the requirements. He argued that "no one has yet ever dared advocate, in direct terms, so monstrous a principle as that the rich ought to be protected by law from the competition of the poor". In 1836, the legislature abolished the restriction. He opposed all licensing requirements for lawyers.

After a disappointing legal career and a failed career in real estate speculation in Ohio, Spooner returned to his father's farm in 1840.

=== American Letter Mail Company ===
Being an advocate of self-employment and opponent of government regulation of business, in 1844 Spooner started the American Letter Mail Company, which competed with the United States Post Office, whose rates were very high. It had offices in various cities, including Baltimore, Philadelphia and New York City. Stamps could be purchased and then attached to letters, which could be brought to any of its offices. From here, agents were dispatched who traveled on railroads and steamboats and carried the letters in handbags. Letters were transferred to messengers in the cities along the routes, who then delivered the letters to the addressees. This was a challenge to the Post Office's legal monopoly.

As he had done when challenging the rules of the Massachusetts Bar Association, Spooner published a pamphlet titled "The Unconstitutionality of the Laws of Congress Prohibiting Private Mails". Although Spooner had finally found commercial success with his mail company, legal challenges by the government eventually exhausted his financial resources. A law enacted in 1851 that strengthened the federal government's monopoly finally put him out of business. The legacy of Spooner's challenge to the postal service was the reduction in letter postage from 5¢ to 3¢, in response to the competition his company provided.

=== Abolitionism ===
Spooner attained his highest profile as a figure in the abolitionist movement. His book The Unconstitutionality of Slavery, published in 1845, contributed to a controversy among abolitionists over whether the Constitution supported the institution of slavery. The disunionist faction led by William Lloyd Garrison and Wendell Phillips argued that the Constitution legally recognized and enforced the oppression of slaves as in the provisions for the capture of fugitive slaves in Article IV, Section 2.

Spooner challenged the claim that the text of the Constitution permitted slavery. He used a complex system of legal and natural law arguments to show that the Constitutional clauses usually interpreted as adopting or at least accepting implicitly the practice of slavery did not in fact support it, despite the open tolerance of human servitude under the original Constitution of 1789; even though those interpretations would only be superseded by the amendments to the Constitution passed after the American Civil War, viz. Amendments XIII–XV, prohibiting the states from enabling or enforcing slavery.

From the publication of this book until 1861, when the Civil War began, Spooner actively campaigned against slavery, though he also argued that the Southern states, like any state or, indeed, any individual, had the right to secede.

=== Later life and death ===
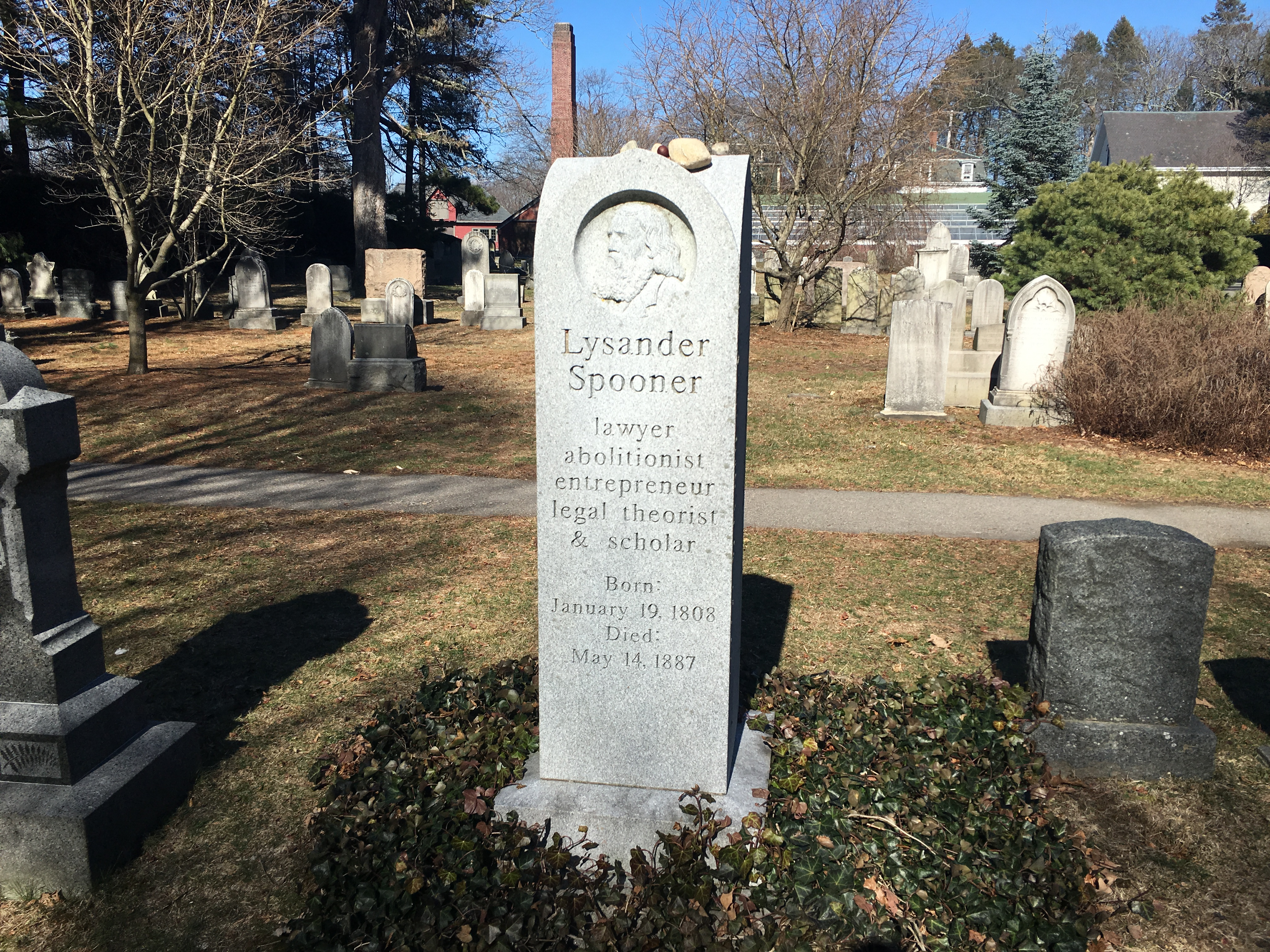
Spooner is interred in the historic Forest Hills Cemetery in Boston, Massachusetts.

Spooner argued that "almost all fortunes are made out of the capital and labour of other men than those who realize them. Indeed, large fortunes could rarely be made at all by one individual, except by his sponging capital and labor from others. And the usury laws are the means by which he does it." Spooner defended the Millerites, who stopped working because they believed the world would soon end and were arrested for vagrancy.

Spooner spent much time in the Boston Athenæum. He died on May 14, 1887, at the age of 79 in his nearby residence at 109 Myrtle Street, Boston. He never married and had no children.

== Political views ==
As an individualist anarchist, Spooner advocated for pre-industrial living in communities of small property holders so that they could pursue life, liberty, happiness, and property in mutual honesty without ceding responsibility to a central government.

=== Governance ===
Spooner argued that one's sovereignty over himself is inalienable and, therefore, that no supposed social contract by which anyone surrendered any fraction of that sovereignty to a government had any validity. Spooner contended that the conventional model of government was necessarily violative of natural rights and that the only model of government consonant with such rights is that exemplified by a voluntary mutual insurance company owned by its members. In the event of a dispute between members of such a "political corporation," Spooner wrote, the disputants' rights would be determined "only by the unanimous verdict of a tribunal fairly representing the whole people,—that is, a tribunal of twelve men, taken, at random from the whole body, and ascertained to be as impartial as the nature of the case will admit, and sworn to the observance of justice."

=== Property ===
Spooner believed that every person has absolute dominion over the products of their labor, regardless of if in their possession. He also rejected limits on the amount of property acquirable by taking unowned natural resources, the only exception being if violence were committed against others or their property.

Spooner believed that just as those who labor own the material product, so do scientists and inventors own their discoveries and inventions, and have right over them in all countries and without any expiration date, and when the owner dies the natural right to their property falls to their descendants. He advocated giving intellectual rights to all past inventions and discoveries to their inventors and discoverers, or their descendants.

=== Wage labor ===
Spooner was opposed to wage labor on grounds of right of every laborer to own fruits of their labor, and desired that "as a general rule... each man should be his own employer, or work directly for himself". Spooner saw wage laborers as servants "coerce[d] by the alternative of starvation", and the wage system an extension of slavery.

=== Vices vs. Crimes ===
Spooner defined vices as "acts by which a man harms himself or his property" and crimes as "those acts by which one man harms the person or property of another". To him, vices are simply errors and don't intend malice, and punishing people for them is an absurdity. Not only would it prevent people from learning what is good or bad, but also impossible, because no person has universal knowledge on what is a virtue and what is a vice. To him, each person has an ability and right to be his own judge of what is a virtue and what is a vice.

=== Banking ===
Spooner was a supporter of free banking and proposed his new form of banking system with the value of money attached to specie and real estate, which he believed would prevent inflation.

=== Militancy ===
Unlike Benjamin Tucker, Spooner was not opposed to violent uprisings against unjust systems. In 1880 Spooner advocated for the Irish to rise up and kill their British landlords, since he believed the landlords were denying them their natural rights.

Earlier in his book No Treason he hinted at supporting violent revolt against the ruling class of United States.

Who compose the real governing power in the country? . . . How shall we find these men? How shall we know them from others? . . . Who, of our neighbours, are members of this secret band of robbers and murderers? How can we know which are their houses, that we may burn or demolish them? Which their property, that we may destroy it? Which their persons, that we may kill them, and rid the world and ourselves of such tyrants and monsters?

Prominient anarcho-syndicalist Rudolf Rocker described him as "a most militant champion of individualistic anarchism in the United States". In A Plan for the Abolition of Slavery, and To the Non-Slaveholders of the South, Spooner argued that slaves have a natural right to liberty, compensation, and use of force against their oppressors, and it is the duty of all to help them in their fight. He advocated for forming "Vigilance Committees, or Leagues of Freedom, in every neighborhood or township, whose duty it shall be to stand in the stead of the government, and do that justice for the slaves,... especially to arrest, try, and chastise (with their own whips) all Slaveholders who shall beat their slaves, or restrain them of their liberty; and compel them to give deeds of emancipation, and conveyances of their property, to their slaves." and to "teach the negroes to treat, all active abettors of the Slaveholders, as you and they treat the Slaveholders themselves, both in person and property."

Our plan then is—

1. To make war (openly or secretly as circumstances may dictate) upon the property of the Slaveholders and their abettors—not for its destruction, if that can easily be avoided, but to convert it to the use of the Slaves. If it cannot be thus converted, then we advise its destruction. Teach the Slaves to burn their masters’ buildings, to kill their cattle and horses, to conceal or destroy farming utensils, to abandon labor in seed time and harvest, and let crops perish. Make Slavery unprofitable, in this way, if it can be done in no other.

2. To make Slaveholders objects of derision and contempt, by flogging them, whenever they shall be guilty of flogging their slaves.

3. To risk no general insurrection, until we of the North go to your assistance, or you are sure of success without our aid.

4. To cultivate the friendship and confidence of the Slaves; to consult with them as to their rights and interests, and the means of promoting them; to show your interest in their welfare, and your readiness to assist them. Let them know that they have your sympathy, and it will give them courage, self-respect, and ambition, and make men of them; infinitely better men to live by, as neighbors and friends, than the indolent, arrogant, selfish, heartless, domineering robbers and tyrants, who now keep both yourselves and the Slaves in subjection, and look with contempt upon all who live by honest labor.

5. To change your political institutions soon as possible. And in the meantime give never a vote to a Slaveholder; pay no taxes to their government, if you can either resist or evade them; as witnesses and jurors, give no testimony, and no verdicts, in support of any Slaveholding claims; perform no military, patrol, or police service; mob Slaveholding courts, gaols, and sheriffs; do nothing, in short, for sustaining Slavery, but every thing you safely and rightfully can, publicly and privately, for its overthrow.

Spooner supported prominent abolitionist militant John Brown and his raid on Harpers Ferry. Spooner even went as far as to propose a plan for abolitionists to kidnap the governor of Virginia, in order to facilitate a prisoner exchange for Brown.

== Influence ==
Though advocates of jury nullification rely on his work, Spooner's legal and constitutional analysis is today widely viewed as idiosyncratic and ahistorical, more that of a pamphlet polemicist than of an objective, systematic thinker. His political thought is likewise criticized as resting upon mistaken economic assumptions.

Spooner's The Unconstitutionality of Slavery was cited in the 2008 Supreme Court case District of Columbia v. Heller which struck down the federal district's ban on handguns. Justice Antonin Scalia, writing for the court, quotes Spooner as saying the right to bear arms was necessary for those who wanted to take a stand against slavery. It was also cited by Justice Clarence Thomas in his concurring opinion in McDonald v. Chicago, another firearms case, the following year.

== Publications ==
Virtually everything written by Spooner is contained in the six-volume compilation The Collected Works of Lysander Spooner (1971). The most notable exception is Vices Are Not Crimes, not widely known until its republication in 1977.

- "The Deist's Immortality, and An Essay on Man's Accountability for His Belief" (1834)
- "The Deist's Reply to the Alleged Supernatural Evidences of Christianity" (1836)
- "Constitutional Law, Relative to Credit, Currency, and Banking" (1843)
- "The Unconstitutionality of the Laws of Congress, Prohibiting Private Mails" (1844)
- The Unconstitutionality of Slavery (1845)
- "Poverty: Its Illegal Causes, and Legal Cure" (1846)
- "Illegality of the Trial of John W. Webster" (1850)
- "An Essay on Trial by Jury" (1852)
- "The Law of Intellectual Property" (1855)
- "A Plan for the Abolition of Slavery, and To the Non-Slaveholders of the South" (1858)
- "Address of the Free Constitutionalists to the People of the United States" (1860)
- "A New System of Paper Currency" (1861)
- "A Letter to Charles Sumner" (1864)
- "Considerations for Bankers, and Holders of United States Bonds" (1864)
- No Treason No. I (1870)
- No Treason No. II: The Constitution (1870)
- No Treason: The Constitution of No Authority (1870)
- "Forced Consent" (1873)
- "Vices Are Not Crimes: A Vindication of Moral Liberty" (1875)
- "Our Financiers: Their Ignorance, Usurpations and Frauds" (1877)
- "Gold and Silver as Standards of Value: The Flagrant Cheat in Regard to Them" (1878)
- "Natural Law, or the Science of Justice" (1882)
- "A Letter to Thomas F. Bayard" (1882)
- "A Letter to Scientists and Inventors, on the Science of Justice" (1884)
- "A Letter to Grover Cleveland, on His False Inaugural Address, the Usurpations and Crimes of Lawmakers and Judges, and the Consequent Poverty, Ignorance, and Servitude of the People" (1886)
- "Two Treatises on Competitive Currency and Banking" (2018)

=== Archival material ===
There are collections of letters written by Spooner in the Boston Public Library and the New York Historical Society.

== See also ==
- Abolitionism in the United States
- American philosophy
- Individualist anarchism
- Free-market anarchism
- Right-libertarianism
- Left-libertarianism
- List of American philosophers
- List of civil rights leaders
- Market anarchism
- Mutualism (economic theory)
- Natural and legal rights
- Natural law

== Bibliography ==
- Barnett, Randy E. (1999). "Was Slavery Unconstitutional Before the Thirteenth Amendment?: Lysander Spooner's Theory of Interpretation". In McKivigan, John (ed.). Abolitionism and American Law. Taylor & Francis. pp. 65–102. ISBN 0815331096. Archived from the original on August 9, 2024.
- Cover, Robert M. (1975). "Formal Assumptions of the Antislavery Forces". Justice Accused: Antislavery and the Judicial Process. Yale University Press. pp. 149–158. ISBN 978-0300161953. JSTOR j.ctt32bmbr.13. Archived from the original on August 9, 2024.
- Long, Roderick T. (2020). "The Anarchist Landscape". In Chartier, Gary; Van Schoelandt, Chad (eds.). The Routledge Handbook of Anarchy and Anarchist Thought. Routledge. pp. 28–38. ISBN 978-1315185255.
- Marshall, Peter H. (2008) [1992]. "American Individualists and Communists". Demanding the Impossible: A History of Anarchism. London: Harper Perennial. pp. 384–395. ISBN 978-0006862451. OCLC 218212571.
- Martin, James J. (1970) [1953]. "Lysander Spooner, Dissident Among Dissidents". Men Against the State: The Expositors of Individualist Anarchism in America, 1827–1908. Colorado Springs: Ralph Myles Publisher. pp. 167–201. ISBN 978-0879260064. OCLC 8827896.
- Shively, Charles (1971). "Biography". In Shively, Charles (ed.). The Collected Works of Lysander Spooner. M&S Press. ISBN 0877300062. OCLC 151618. Archived from the original on March 24, 2019.
- Shone, Steve J. (2010). Lysander Spooner, American Anarchist. Lexington Books. ISBN 978-0739144503. OCLC 1253438526. Archived from the original on July 23, 2024.
- Smith, George H. (1992). "Introduction". In Smith, George H. (ed.). The Lysander Spooner Reader. Fox and Wilkes. pp. vii–xx. ISBN 0930073061.
- Wiecek, William M. (1977). "Radical Constitutional Antislavery: The Imagined Past, the Remembered Future". The Sources of Anti-Slavery Constitutionalism in America, 1760–1848. Cornell University Press. pp. 249–275. ISBN 978-1501726446. JSTOR 10.7591/j.ctt207g6m0.16.
