= The Unconstitutionality of Slavery =

1845 abolitionist essay by Lysander Spooner

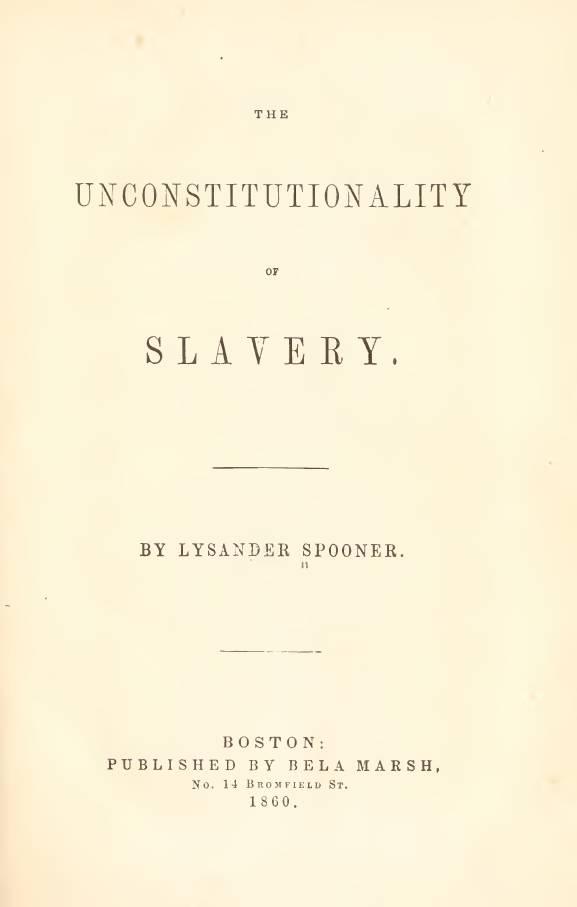
- Second edition title page
- Author: Lysander Spooner
- Language: English
- Subject: Abolitionism
- Genre: Political philosophy
- Publication date: 1845
- Publication place: United States
- Text: The Unconstitutionality of Slavery at Wikisource

The Unconstitutionality of Slavery is an 1845 abolitionist essay written by the American abolitionist Lysander Spooner. In it, Spooner responds to Garrisonian abolitionists and proslavery theorists who argued that slavery was supported by the United States Constitution. Spooner claims that slavery is unconstitutional and cites natural law, colonial charters, and American founding documents to argue that there is no legal basis for the existence of slavery in the United States and that Congress is obligated to prohibit it.

Spooner was an anarchist who argued that the authority of the courts was derived from fundamental principles of justice and universal human rights. He cites the precedent established in Somerset v Stewart that slavery is incompatible with liberty and cannot exist absent positive legal sanction. Spooner notes that contrary to this principle, the Articles of Confederation, the several state constitutions, and the 1787 federal constitution do not refer to slavery directly; the Declaration of Independence, meanwhile, implicitly proscribes slavery by recognizing life, liberty, and the pursuit of happiness as self-evident natural rights. Spooner rejects appeals to original intent concerning the historical context for constitutional provisions generally understood to address slavery, arguing that laws must be interpreted according to the ordinary meaning of the text. He concludes that there is no legal basis for slavery in the United States and that the Guarantee Clause requires Congress to enforce emancipation.

The Unconstitutionality of Slavery was highly influential and widely read. Many political abolitionists praised Spooner's views on the Constitution, although Spooner himself declined to join the Liberty Party due to his opposition to government. The 1860 edition carried endorsements from nationally-prominent abolitionists and antislavery leaders including William H. Seward, Gerrit Smith, Wendell Phillips, and William Lloyd Garrison. Although Garrison disagreed with Spooner's conclusions, he commended Spooner for his honesty and ingenuity. Phillips also disagreed with Spooner's conclusions, and wrote a critical review of the work arguing that slavery was permitted by the Constitution. Spooner's emphasis on natural law as the basis for society shared the assumptions of Garrisonian and non-Garrisonian abolitionists who opposed violence and arbitrary power.

== See also ==
- The Constitution of the United States: is it pro-slavery or anti-slavery?

== Bibliography ==
=== Primary sources ===
- Spooner, Lysander (1845). The Unconstitutionality of Slavery. Boston.
- Spooner, Lysander (1860). The Unconstitutionality of Slavery (Enlarged ed.). Boston.

=== Secondary sources ===
- Johnson, Reinhard O. (2009). The Liberty Party, 1840–1848: Antislavery Third-Party Politics in the United States. Baton Rouge: Louisiana State University Press.
- Perry, Lewis (1973). Radical Abolitionism: Anarchy and the Government of God in Antislavery Thought. Ithaca, NY: Cornell University Press.
