= Fugitive Slave Clause =

Mostly obsolete clause of the U.S. Constitution

The Fugitive Slave Clause in the United States Constitution, also known as either the Slave Clause or the Fugitives From Labor Clause, is Article IV, Section 2, Clause 3, which requires a "Person held to Service or Labour" (usually a slave, apprentice, or indentured servant) who flees to another state to be returned to his or her master in the state from which that person escaped. The enactment of the Thirteenth Amendment to the United States Constitution, which abolished slavery except as a punishment for a crime, has made the clause mostly irrelevant.

== Text ==
The text of the Fugitive Slave Clause is:

No Person held to Service or Labour in one State, under the Laws thereof, escaping into another, shall, in Consequence of any Law or Regulation therein, be discharged from such Service or Labour, but shall be delivered up on Claim of the Party to whom such Service or Labour may be due.

As with other references in the original Constitution to slavery, the words "slave" and "slavery" are not used in this clause. Historian Donald Fehrenbacher believes that throughout the Constitution there was the intent to make it clear that slavery existed only under state law, not federal law. In this instance, Fehrenbacher concludes:

Most revealing in this respect was a last-minute change in the fugitive clause whereby the phrase "legally held to service or labour in one state" was changed to read "held to service or labour in one state, under the laws thereof." The revision made it impossible to infer from the passage that the Constitution itself legally sanctioned slavery.

== Background ==
Prior to the American Revolution, there were no generally accepted principles of international law that required sovereign states to return fugitive slaves who had fled to their territory. English court decisions and opinions came down on both sides of the issue.

The ambiguity was resolved with the Somerset v Stewart decision in 1772. Lord Mansfield ordered that a fugitive slave from Massachusetts who had reached England, where slavery was not a legally recognised status (although not positively prohibited until the Slavery Abolition Act 1833) was a free person who could not be legally returned to his previous owners. Absent a long-standing local custom or positive legislation requiring the return, judges were bound by English law to ignore the prior legal status of the fugitive under foreign laws. Although the decision did not affect the colonies directly and despite a general record of cooperation by northern colonies, law professor Steven Lubet wrote:

Nonetheless, the Somerset precedent was frightening to southern slaveholders. It had been widely published in America, and often over-interpreted as having completely abolished slavery under British law. News of the ruling had spread by word of mouth among slaves, which of course was troubling to their masters.

During and after the American Revolutionary War under the Articles of Confederation, there was no way to compel free states to capture fugitive slaves from other states and return them to their former masters, although there were provisions for the extradition of criminals. Despite this, there was not a widespread belief that this was a problem or that Northern states failed to cooperate on the issue. This was due at least in part to the fact that by 1787 only Vermont and Massachusetts had outlawed or effectively outlawed slavery.

At the Constitutional Convention, many slavery issues were debated and for a time slavery was a major impediment to passage of the new constitution. However, there was little discussion concerning the issue of fugitive slaves. After the Three-Fifths Compromise resolved the issue of how to count slaves in the distribution of taxes and the apportionment of the members of the United States House of Representatives, two South Carolina delegates, Charles Pinckney and Pierce Butler, on August 28, 1787, proposed that fugitive slaves should be "delivered up like criminals". James Wilson of Pennsylvania and Roger Sherman of Connecticut originally objected. Wilson argued that the provision "would oblige the Executive of the State to do it at public expence", while Sherman stated that he "saw no more propriety in the public seizing and surrendering a slave or servant, than a horse". After these objections, the discussion was dropped.

The next day Butler proposed the following language which was passed with no debate or objections.

If any person bound to service or labor in any of the United States shall escape into another State, he or she shall not be discharged from such service or labor, in consequence of any regulations subsisting in the State to which they escape, but shall be delivered up to the person justly claiming their service or labor.

Afterwards, the Convention's Committee on Style formed a digest of the plan, to which many of the delegates later sought to have the word "legally" struck out, fearing this might favor the idea that "slavery was legal in a moral view".

== Resistance, enforcement, and legal controversy ==
Despite the Fugitive Slave Clause's constitutional authority, Northern resistance to its enforcement increased steadily in the 19th century, especially after the enactment of the Fugitive Slave Act of 1850. Several Northern states enacted personal liberty laws to circumvent the Clause, aiming to protect free Black residents from kidnapping and provide procedural safeguards for accused fugitives. For example, Massachusetts prohibited state officials from assisting in fugitive slave renditions and banned the use of state facilities for holding alleged fugitives.

Legal challenges mounted. In Ableman v. Booth (1859), the Supreme Court reversed the Wisconsin Supreme Court’s decision that had freed abolitionist Sherman Booth, who had been jailed for aiding an escaped slave. Chief Justice Roger B. Taney ruled that states could not obstruct federal enforcement, reinforcing federal supremacy but further polarizing public opinion.

Many Black communities in the North were directly affected. The broad language of the Clause and its enforcement mechanisms enabled the kidnapping of free African Americans who were then illegally enslaved. The case of Solomon Northup, a free man abducted in Washington, D.C., and enslaved in Louisiana for twelve years, highlighted how the Clause enabled systemic abuse.

Modern legal scholars debate whether the Fugitive Slave Clause conferred constitutional legitimacy on slavery. Some argue its vague wording was a political compromise that avoided overtly validating slavery at the federal level, while others contend it functionally entrenched slaveholder power. Akhil Reed Amar has argued that the Clause’s ambiguity allowed both pro- and anti-slavery factions to claim constitutional ground, reflecting deeper contradictions in the founding document itself.

== Legacy ==
When South Carolina seceded from the Union in late 1860, its secession convention issued the Declaration of the Immediate Causes Which Induce and Justify the Secession of South Carolina from the Federal Union. The declaration placed heavy emphasis on the importance of the Fugitive Slave Clause to South Carolina and accused Northern states of flagrantly violating it, going as far as naming specific states.

Unlike the U.S. Constitution, the Constitution of the Confederate States mentioned slavery by name and specified African Americans as the subject. It contained a much more rigid form of the Fugitive Slave Clause.

In 1864, during the Civil War, an effort to repeal this clause of the Constitution failed. The subsequent passage of the Thirteenth Amendment to the United States Constitution abolished slavery "except as a punishment for crime," rendering the clause mostly moot. However, it has been noted in connection with the Fugitive Slave Clause that people can still be held to service or labor under limited circumstances; the U.S. Supreme Court stated in United States v. Kozminski, 487 U.S. 931, 943 (1988), that "not all situations in which labor is compelled by physical coercion or force of law violate the Thirteenth Amendment."

== See also ==
- Fugitive slave laws
- Slave Trade Acts

== Bibliography ==
- Amar, Akhil Reed. America's Constitution: A Biography (2005). ISBN 0-8129-7272-4.
- Fehrenbacher, Don E. The Slaveholding Republic: An Account of the United States Government's Relations to Slavery (2001). ISBN 0-19-514177-6.
- Finkelman, Paul. "The Kidnapping of John Davis and the Adoption of the Fugitive Slave Law of 1793". The Journal of Southern History (Vol. LVI, No. 3, August 1990).
- Goldstone, Lawrence. Dark Bargain: Slavery, Profits, and the Struggle for the Constitution (2005). ISBN 0-8027-1460-9.
- Lubet, Steven. Fugitive Justice: Runaways, Rescuers, and Slavery on Trial (2010). ISBN 978-0-674-04704-4.
- Madison, James. "Notes on the Debates in the Federal Convention"
