= Fugitive Slave Act of 1793 =

Act of the United States Congress

- Long title: An Act respecting fugitives from justice, and persons escaping from the service of their masters.
- Enacted by: the 2nd United States Congress

Citations
- Statutes at Large: 1 Stat. 302

Legislative history
- Introduced in the Senate as S. 42; Passed the House on February 5, 17 (48–7); Signed into law by President George Washington on February 12, 1793

Major amendments
- Fugitive Slave Clause

The Fugitive Slave Act of 1793 was an Act of the United States Congress to give effect to the Fugitive Slave Clause of the U.S. Constitution (Article IV, Section 2, Clause 3), which was later superseded by the Thirteenth Amendment, and to also give effect to the Extradition Clause (Article 4, Section 2, Clause 2). The Constitution's Fugitive Slave Clause guaranteed a right for a slaveholder to recover an escaped slave. The subsequent Act, "An Act respecting fugitives from justice, and persons escaping from the service of their masters", created the legal mechanism by which that could be accomplished.

== Passage and later amendment ==
The Act was passed by the House of Representatives on February 4, 1793, by a vote of 48–7, with 14 abstaining. The "Annals of Congress" state that the law was approved on February 12, 1793.

The Act was written amidst a controversy about a free black man named John Davis who was kidnapped from Pennsylvania and brought to Virginia. However, the Act failed to resolve that controversy; the kidnappers from Virginia were never extradited to Pennsylvania, and John Davis remained a slave.

The Act was later strengthened at the insistence of the slave states of the American South by the Compromise of 1850, which required state governments and the residents of free states to enforce the capture and return of fugitive slaves. The enforcement of the Fugitive Slave Act of 1850 outraged Northern public opinion.

== Excerpts ==
SEC. 3. And be it also enacted, That when a person held to labor in any of the United States, or in either of the Territories on the Northwest or South of the river Ohio, under the laws thereof, shall escape into any other part of the said States or Territory, the person to whom such labor or service may be due, his agent or attorney, is hereby empowered to seize or arrest such fugitive from labor, and to take him or her before any Judge of the Circuit or District Courts of the United States, residing or being within the State, or before any magistrate of a county, city, or town corporate, wherein such seizure or arrest shall be made, and upon proof to the satisfaction of such Judge or magistrate, either by oral testimony or affidavit taken before and certified by a magistrate of any such State or Territory, that the person so seized or arrested, doth, under the laws of the State or Territory from which he or she fled, owe service or labor to the person claiming him or her, it shall be the duty of such Judge or magistrate to give a certificate thereof to such claimant, his agent, or attorney, which shall be sufficient warrant for removing the said fugitive from labor to the State or Territory from which he or she fled.

SEC. 4. And be it further enacted, That any person who shall knowingly and willingly obstruct or hinder such claimant, his agent, or attorney, in so seizing or arresting such fugitive from labor, or shall rescue such fugitive from such claimant, his agent or attorney, when so arrested pursuant to the authority herein given and declared; or shall harbor or conceal such person after notice that he or she was a fugitive from labor, as aforesaid, shall, for either of the said offences, forfeit and pay the sum of five hundred dollars. Which penalty may be recovered by and for the benefit of such claimant, by action of debt, in any Court proper to try the same, saving moreover to the person claiming such labor or service his right of action for or on account of the said injuries, or either of them.

The full text of the Act is available from the Library of Congress (and online) in the Annals of Congress of the 2nd Congress, 2nd Session, during which the proceedings and debates took place from November 5, 1792, to March 2, 1793. The specific Act and the Congressional vote is on pages 1414–1415.

== Effects ==
This law put fugitive slaves at risk of recapture for the rest of their lives, but some slave-owners did not think that it was strong enough. It also classified children born to fugitive slave mothers as slaves and the property of their mother's master for the rest of their lives.

Ona Maria Judge, sometimes referred to by the diminutive 'Oney' by her owners, was one of Martha Washington's slaves and chambermaids. She served the Washingtons in Virginia and at the President's House in Philadelphia when George Washington was President (the city was the temporary capital from 1790 to 1800). She escaped on May 21, 1796. Washington made two attempts to seize her shortly afterwards, even enlisting the help of the Secretary of the Treasury Oliver Wolcott Jr. in a letter written on September 1, 1796. Later, his nephew visited her and asked for her to return. Neither attempt was successful. Washington acted discreetly to avoid controversy in Philadelphia, which had a strong Quaker abolitionist community.

Having settled in New Hampshire, married and had a child, Oney Judge was interviewed by Rev. Benjamin Chase in the 1840s. He published the account in a "letter to the editor" in the abolitionist newspaper The Liberator on January 1, 1847. He described how under the law, she and her child were still at risk for being seized as a fugitive slave at any time, even 50 years after her escape, if Martha Washington's descendants decided to make a legal claim. Legally, they had inherited the pair as part of their mother's estate:

This woman is yet a slave. If Washington could have got her and her child, they were constitutionally his; and if Mrs. Washington's heirs were now to claim her, and take her before Judge Woodbury, and prove their title, he would be bound, upon his oath, to deliver her up to them.

Many northern states enacted legislation to protect free black Americans (who could otherwise be abducted, brought before court without the ability to produce a defense, and then lawfully enslaved) as well as runaway slaves. Those laws came to be known as personal liberty laws and required slave owners and fugitive hunters to produce evidence that their captures were truly fugitive slaves, "just as southern states demanded the right to retrieve runaway slaves, northern states demanded the right to protect their free black residents from being kidnapped and sold into servitude in the south" (Finkelman 399).

One controversy was the case of Prigg v. Pennsylvania. Edward Prigg, a citizen of Maryland, was indicted by a Pennsylvania court for attempting to kidnap a black woman in York County to return her to Maryland as a fugitive slave. He was tried and convicted by a local court in Pennsylvania, but the case was eventually appealed to the Supreme Court of the United States. Prigg had originally shown his legal warrant to the Pennsylvania court, but it had been unlawfully ignored, which demonstrated that the Fugitive Slave Act really depended on state judges, not federal law.

The slave-catching industry expanded as a result of the law, with men who were effectively bounty hunters capturing and returning many slaves to their owners.

In addition, the high demand for slaves in the Deep South and hunt for fugitives caused free blacks to be at risk of being kidnapped and sold into slavery, even if they had their "free" papers. There were numerous instances of people who were legally free and had never been slaves being captured and brought south to be sold into slavery. The historian Carol Wilson documented 300 such cases in Freedom at Risk (1994) and estimated there were likely thousands of others. A prominent example of this was Solomon Northup, born free around 1808 to Mintus Northup and his wife in Essex County, New York state. (In his memoir, Solomon did not name his mother but described her as of mixed race and a quadroon.) In 1841, Northup was tricked into going to Washington, DC, where slavery was legal. He was drugged, kidnapped, and sold into slavery, and he was held as a slave in Louisiana for 12 years. One of the very few to regain freedom under such circumstances, he later sued the slave traders involved in Washington, DC. Its law prohibited Northup from testifying against the white men because he was black and so he lost the case. The New York Times published an article on the trial on January 20, 1853. Northup published his memoir, Twelve Years a Slave (1853), a slave narrative of plantation life on the Red River in Louisiana, and a description of Washington, D.C.'s slave trade. The memoir was adapted as a feature film by British director Steve McQueen in 2013, winning three Academy Awards, including Best Picture. The critics praised the screenplay and the performances, but there were conflicting views about the historical accuracy of the events, both in the film and in the book.

== See also ==
- Fugitive slave laws in the United States
- Prigg v. Pennsylvania
- Slave Trade Acts
