= Three-fifths Compromise =

Superseded US Constitution clause counting slaves

An animation showing the free/slave status of U.S. states and territories, 1789–1861 (see separate yearly maps below). The American Civil War began in 1861. The 13th Amendment, effective December 6, 1865, abolished slavery in the U.S.

The Three-fifths Compromise, also known as the Constitutional Compromise of 1787, was an agreement reached during the 1787 United States Constitutional Convention over the inclusion of slaves in counting a state's total population. This count would determine the number of seats in the House of Representatives, the number of electoral votes each state would be allocated, and how much money the states would pay in taxes. Slave states wanted their entire population to be counted to determine the number of Representatives those states could elect and send to Congress. Free states wanted to exclude the counting of slave populations in slave states, since those slaves had no voting rights. A compromise was struck to resolve this impasse. The compromise counted three-fifths of each state's slave population toward that state's total population for the purpose of apportioning the House of Representatives, effectively giving the Southern United States more power in the House relative to the Northern United States. It also gave slaveholders similarly enlarged powers in Southern legislatures; this was an issue in the secession of West Virginia from Virginia in 1863. Free black people and indentured servants were not subject to the compromise, and each was counted as one full person for representation.

The Three-fifths Compromise is in Article 1, Section 2, Clause 3 of the United States Constitution. It provides:

Representatives and direct Taxes shall be apportioned among the several States which may be included within this Union, according to their respective Numbers, which shall be determined by adding to the whole Number of free Persons, including those bound to Service for a Term of Years, and excluding Indians not taxed, three fifths of all other Persons [italics added].

In 1868, Section 2 of the Fourteenth Amendment superseded this clause by providing that members of the House of Representatives "shall be apportioned among the several States" by "counting the whole number of persons in each State, excluding Indians not taxed."

== Drafting and ratification in the Constitution ==
The apportionment clause, quoted above, specifies two applications: direct taxation and representation. These applications created conflicting motivations. Slave holding states wanted apportionment to omit slaves when calculating the direct taxation a state might suffer, but they wanted apportionment to fully count slaves when calculating the strength of a state's representation in Congress. Ultimately, representation was the greater concern.

=== Confederation Congress ===
The three-fifths ratio originated with an amendment proposed to the Articles of Confederation on April 18, 1783. The amendment was to have changed the basis for determining the wealth of each state, and hence its tax obligations, from real estate to population, as a measure of ability to produce wealth. The proposal by a committee of the Congress had suggested that taxes "shall be supplied by the several colonies in proportion to the number of inhabitants of every age, sex, and quality, except Indians not paying taxes". The South immediately objected to this formula since it would include slaves, who were viewed primarily as property, in calculating the amount of taxes to be paid. As Thomas Jefferson wrote in his notes on the debates, the Southern states would be taxed "according to their numbers and their wealth conjunctly, while the northern would be taxed on numbers only".

After proposed compromises of one-half by Benjamin Harrison of Virginia and three-fourths by several New Englanders failed to gain sufficient support, Congress finally settled on the three-fifths ratio proposed by James Madison. But this amendment ultimately failed, falling two states short of the unanimous approval required to amend the Articles of Confederation (New Hampshire and New York opposed it).

=== Federalist Papers 54–55 ===
Madison explained the reasoning for the 3/5 in Federalist No. 54 "The Apportionment of Members Among the States" (February 12, 1788) as:

"We subscribe to the doctrine," might one of our Southern brethren observe, "that representation relates more immediately to persons, and taxation more immediately to property, and we join in the application of this distinction to the case of our slaves. But we must deny the fact, that slaves are considered merely as property, and in no respect whatever as persons. The true state of the case is, that they partake of both these qualities: being considered by our laws, in some respects, as persons, and in other respects as property...Let the case of the slaves be considered, as it is in truth, a peculiar one. Let the compromising expedient of the Constitution be mutually adopted, which regards them as inhabitants, but as debased by servitude below the equal level of free inhabitants, which regards the SLAVE as divested of two fifths of the MAN...The federal Constitution, therefore, decides with great propriety on the case of our slaves, when it views them in the mixed character of persons and of property. This is in fact their true character. It is the character bestowed on them by the laws under which they live; and it will not be denied, that these are the proper criterion; because it is only under the pretext that the laws have transformed the negroes into subjects of property, that a place is disputed them in the computation of numbers; and it is admitted, that if the laws were to restore the rights which have been taken away, the negroes could no longer be refused an equal share of representation with the other inhabitants.

Madison later expanded further in Federalist No. 55 "The Total Number of the House of Representatives" (February 15, 1788) as explaining that the 3/5 had to do with estimating the population size of slaves at the time as well:

Within three years a census is to be taken, when the number may be augmented to one for every thirty thousand inhabitants; and within every successive period of ten years the census is to be renewed, and augmentations may continue to be made under the above limitation. It will not be thought an extravagant conjecture that the first census will, at the rate of one for every thirty thousand, raise the number of representatives to at least one hundred. Estimating the negroes in the proportion of three fifths, it can scarcely be doubted that the population of the United States will by that time, if it does not already, amount to three millions.

=== Constitutional Convention ===
During the Constitutional Convention, the compromise was proposed by delegate James Wilson and seconded by Charles Pinckney.

When he presented his plan for the frame of government to the convention on its first day, Charles Pinckney of South Carolina proposed that for the purposes of apportionment, a "House of Delegates" be determined through the apportionment of "one Member for every thousand Inhabitants 3/5 of Blacks included." The Convention unanimously accepted the principle that representation in the House of Representatives would be in proportion to the relative state populations, but it initially rejected his proposal regarding apportionment of the black population along with the rest of his plan. Delegates opposed to slavery proposed that only free inhabitants of each state be counted for apportionment purposes, while delegates supportive of slavery opposed the proposal, wanting slaves to count in their actual numbers.

The proposal to count slaves by a three-fifths ratio was first presented on June 11, and agreed to by nine states to two with only a brief debate. It was debated at length between July 9 and 13 (inclusive) when it was initially voted down by the members present at the Convention six to four. A few Southern delegates, seeing an opportunity, then proposed full representation for their slave population; most states voted no. Seeing that the states could not remain united about counting the slaves as five-fifths without some sort of compromise measure, the ratio of three-fifths was brought back to the table and agreed to by eight states to two.

=== Debate ===
Gouverneur Morris from New York doubted that a direct tax, whose burden on Southern states would be increased by the Three-fifths Compromise, could be effectively leveled on the vast United States. The primary ways of generating federal revenue, he said, would be excise taxes and import duties, which would tax the North more than the South; therefore, the taxation provision was irrelevant, and the compromise would only increase the number of pro-slavery legislators.

Northern delegates argued only voters should be accounted for. Southern delegates countered, claiming slaves counted just as much as voters, despite Northerners questioning why slaves should be held by Southerners.

=== Compromise and enactment ===
After a contentious debate, the compromise that was finally agreed upon—of counting "all other persons" as only three-fifths of their actual numbers—reduced the representation of the slave states relative to the original proposals, but improved it over the Northern position. An inducement for slave states to accept the Compromise was its tie to taxation in the same ratio, so that the burden of taxation on the slave states was also reduced.

A contentious issue at the 1787 Constitutional Convention was whether slaves would be counted as part of the population or would instead be considered property and, as such, not be considered in determining representation of the states in the House of Representatives and the Electoral College. The Southern states wanted each slave to count as a full person, whereas the Northern states did not want them to count at all. Elbridge Gerry asked, why should "blacks, who were property in the South", count toward representation "any more than the Cattle & horses of the North"?

Although slave states argued that slaves should be considered persons in determining representation, they wanted them considered property if the new government were to levy taxes on the states on the basis of population. Delegates from states where slavery had become rare argued that slaves should be included in taxation, but not in determining representation.

The proposed ratio was a ready solution to the impasse that arose during the Constitutional Convention. In that situation, the alignment of the contending forces was the reverse of what had been obtained under the Articles of Confederation in 1783. In amending the Articles, the North wanted slaves to count for more than the South did because the objective was to determine taxes paid by the states to the federal government. In the Constitutional Convention, the more important issue was representation in Congress, so the South wanted slaves to count for more than the North did.

Much has been said of the impropriety of representing men who have no will of their own… They are men, though degraded to the condition of slavery. They are persons known to the municipal laws of the states which they inhabit, as well as to the laws of nature. But representation and taxation go together… Would it be just to impose a singular burden, without conferring some adequate advantage?

— Alexander Hamilton

== Before the Civil War ==
By excluding two-fifths of slaves in the legislative apportionment based on population (as provided in the constitution), the Three-fifths Compromise, from the South's point of view, reduced the slave states' representation, compared to the free states' representation, in the House of Representatives. From the North's point of view, by including three-fifths of slaves in the legislative apportionment, even though they had no voting rights, the Three-fifths Compromise provided additional representation in the House of Representatives of slave states compared to the free states, if representation had been considered based on the non-slave population. Based on the latter view, in 1793, for example, Southern slave states had 47 of the 105 seats but would have had 33 had seats been assigned based on free populations. In 1812, slave states had 76 seats out of 143 instead of the 59 they would have had; in 1833, 98 seats out of 240, instead of 73. As a result, Southern states had additional influence on the presidency, the speakership of the House, and the Supreme Court until the American Civil War. In addition, the Southern states' insistence on equal numbers of slave and free states, which was maintained until 1850, safeguarded the Southern bloc in the Senate as well as Electoral College votes.

Akhil Reed Amar writes, with respect to the 1800 presidential election, "Without the three-fifths bonus that swelled Jefferson's tally ... Adams would have won the presidency...." Garry Wills writes that, without the additional slave state votes, "slavery would have been excluded from Missouri ... Jackson's Indian removal policy would have failed ... the Wilmot Proviso would have banned slavery in territories won from Mexico ... the Kansas-Nebraska bill would have failed." "In January 1840, the House passed a 'hard-gag' rule prohibiting a wide range of anti-slavery petitions from even being allowed to be heard on the House floor or printed in any House publication. The vote for the hard gag was close, 114-108, and the Three-Fifths Clause tipped the balance." The Three-Fifths Clause "tilted the sectional balance from the start and gave all Southerners, including Jefferson, a powerful incentive to extend the slave system."

=== Debate ===
Before the Civil War aspects of the Constitution were subject for significant debate by abolitionists. The Garrisonian view (William Lloyd Garrison (1805–1879), a prominent American abolitionist best known for his widely read anti-slavery newspaper The Liberator of the 1830s) of the Constitution was that it was a pro-slavery document and only completely dividing the Union could satisfy the cause of anti-slavery.

Following a bitter series of public debates including one with George Thompson, Frederick Douglass took another view, pointing to the Constitution as an anti-slavery document:

But giving the provisions the very worse construction, what does it amount to? I answer—It is a downright disability laid upon the slaveholding States; one which deprives those States of two-fifths of their natural basis of representation. A black man in a free State is worth just two-fifths more than a black man in a slave State, as a basis of political power under the Constitution. Therefore, instead of encouraging slavery, the Constitution encourages freedom by giving an increase of "two-fifths" of political power to free over slave States. So much for the three-fifths clause; taking it at is worst, it still leans to freedom, not slavery; for, be it remembered that the Constitution nowhere forbids a coloured man to vote.

Akhil Reed Amar writes that Douglass and others "argued that the Three-Fifth's Clause did not deserve the derision poured on it at Philadelphia [in 1787].... After all, 1780s free women did not vote; nor did free children. Yet the Philadelphia Constitution counted both groups for apportionment purposes. If counting these nonvoting free folk was proper, then why wasn't it also proper to count nonvoting slaves? Free women and children ... counted at a full five-fifths. Slaves counted for less. Thus, Douglass and others argued, the Philadelphia system was a two-fifths slavery penalty (three-fifths compared to five-fifths), not a three-fifths slavery bonus (three-fifths compared to zero-fifths)." But this interpretation, Amar continues, "glossed over a key fact:"

[A]ccording to the dominant political theory of republican government in the 1780s ... free women and free children could properly count ... because their voting and devoted husbands, brothers, and fathers sincerely took into account and earnestly represented their best interests. South Carolina masters, by contrast, did not claim to represent slaves or their best interests. Rather, masters claimed a right to own slaves—[which was] ... entirely contrary to the slaves' best interests.

== After the Civil War ==
Section 2 of the Fourteenth Amendment (1868) later superseded Article 1, Section 2, Clause 3 and effectively repealed the compromise. It provides, "Representatives shall be apportioned ... counting the whole number of persons in each State, excluding Indians not taxed." A later provision of the same clause reduced the congressional representation of states who denied the right to vote to adult male citizens, but this provision was never effectively enforced. (The Thirteenth Amendment, ratified in 1865, had already eliminated almost all persons from the original clause's jurisdiction by banning slavery, "except as punishment for a crime whereof the party shall have been duly convicted".)

After the Reconstruction era came to an end in 1877, the former slave states subverted the objective of these changes by using terrorism and other illegal tactics to disenfranchise their black citizens, while obtaining the benefit of apportionment of representatives on the basis of the total populations. These measures effectively gave white Southerners even greater voting power than they had in the antebellum era, inflating the number of Southern Democrats in the House of Representatives as well as the number of votes they could exercise in the Electoral College in the election of the president.

The disenfranchisement of black citizens eventually attracted the attention of Congress, and, in 1900, some members proposed stripping the South of seats, in proportion to the number of people who were barred from voting. In the end, Congress did not act to change apportionment, largely because of the power of the Southern bloc. The Southern bloc comprised Southern Democrats voted into office by white voters and constituted a powerful voting bloc in Congress until the 1960s. Their representatives, re-elected repeatedly by one-party states, controlled numerous chairmanships of important committees in both houses on the basis of seniority, giving them control over rules, budgets and important patronage projects, among other issues. Their power allowed them to defeat federal legislation against racial violence and abuses in the South, until overcome by the civil rights movement.

== Historical interpretation ==
There is a persistent and sometimes contentious debate among historians, legal scholars, and political scientists over whether the Three-fifths Compromise should be construed to support the notion that slaves were conceived of not only demographically, but also ontologically, three-fifths of a person or whether the three-fifths was purely a statistical designation used to determine how many representatives Southern states would have in Congress. A frequent claim made in favor of the former argument is that previous electoral precedent held that one man was equivalent to one vote, and the fact that the compromise explicitly tied personhood to votes provides a basis for an ontological reading of the compromise as implying that enslaved people lacked full personhood. Supporters of the statistical argument dispute that ontological considerations were present in the mind of Congress at the time or that the Three-fifths Compromise had any regard for such notions in its purpose and function. However, it is generally agreed upon and historiographically reflected that enslaved people had no legal recourse or standing to challenge or participate in any kind of electoral legislation or activities of their own accord, which was confirmed 70 years later by the Supreme Court in Dred Scott v. Sandford. This inequality in electoral rights did not substantively change until after the passage of the Thirteenth, Fourteenth, Fifteenth, and Nineteenth Amendments as well as the Voting Rights Act of 1965.

== See also ==
- Fugitive Slave Act of 1793
- Emancipation Proclamation
- Section 127 of the Australian Constitution, excluding Australian Aboriginals from the census for purposes of determining allocation of seats in Parliament

== Bibliography ==
=== Books ===
- Amar, Akhil Reed (2005). America's Constitution: A Biography. New York: Random House.
- Amar, Akhil Reed (2025). Born Equal: Remaking America's Constitution, 1840-1920. New York: Basic Books.
- Feldman, Noah (2017). The Three Lives of James Madison: Genius, Partisan, President. Random House. ISBN 978-0-8129-9275-5.
- Lynd, Staughton (1965), "The Abolitionist Critique of the United States Constitution", in Duberman, Martin B. (ed.), New Essays on the Abolitionists, Princeton, NJ: Princeton University Press, pp. 209–239
- Pildes, Richard H. (October 18, 2013) [2000]. "Democracy, Anti-Democracy, and the Canon". Constitutional Commentary. 17. SSRN 224731.
- Story, Joseph L. (1833). Commentaries on the Constitution of the United States. Vol. 2. Boston and Cambridge, Massachusetts: William Hilliard, Gray, and Company; Brown, Shattuck and Co.
- Walton, Hanes Jr.; Smith, Robert C. (2005). American Politics and the African American Quest for Universal Freedom (3rd ed.). Pearson Longman. ISBN 978-0-321-29237-7.
- Wiencek, Henry (2004). An Imperfect God: George Washington, His Slaves, and the Creation of America. Farrar, Straus, and Giroux. ISBN 978-0-374-52951-2.
- Williams, Francis Leigh (1978). A Founding Family: The Pinckneys of South Carolina. New York: Harcourt, Brace, Jovanovich. ISBN 978-0-15-131503-1.
- Wills, Garry (2003). Negro President: Jefferson and the Slave Power. Boston: Houghton Mifflin. ISBN 978-0618-34398-0.

=== Articles ===
- Ballingrud, Gordon; Dougherty, Keith L. (October 2018). "Coalitional Instability and the Three-Fifths Compromise". American Journal of Political Science. 62 (4): 12. doi:10.1111/ajps.12378. JSTOR 26598788. S2CID 158959015.
- Earle, Jonathan (April 2011). "The Political Origins of the Civil War". OAH Magazine of History. 25 (2): 8–13. doi:10.1093/oahmag/oar006. JSTOR 23210239.
- Estes, Todd (Summer 2011). "The Connecticut Effect: The Great Compromise of 1787 and the History of Small State Impact on Electoral College Outcomes". The Historian. 73 (2): 255–283. doi:10.1111/j.1540-6563.2011.00291.x. JSTOR 24455090. S2CID 143351061.
- Farrand, Max (April 1904). "Compromises of the Constitution". The American Historical Review. 9 (3): 479–489. doi:10.2307/1833471. JSTOR 1833471.
- Lynd, Staughton (June 1966). "The Compromise of 1787". Political Science Quarterly. 81 (2). Oxford University Press: 225–250. doi:10.2307/2147971. JSTOR 2147971.
- Nelson, William E. (July 1987). "Reason and Compromise in the Establishment of the Federal Constitution, 1787-1801". The William and Mary Quarterly. 44 (3): 458–484. doi:10.2307/1939766. JSTOR 1939766.
- Ohline, Howard A. (October 1971). "Republicanism and Slavery: Origins of the Three-Fifths Clause in the United States Constitution". The William and Mary Quarterly. 28 (4): 563–584. doi:10.2307/1922187. JSTOR 1922187.
- Pope, Jeremy C.; Treier, Shawn (April 2011). "Reconsidering the Great Compromise at the Federal Convention of 1787: Deliberation and Agenda Effects on the Senate and Slavery". American Journal of Political Science. 55 (3): 18. doi:10.1111/j.1540-5907.2010.00490.x. JSTOR 23025052.
- Rakove, Jack N. (July 1987). "The Great Compromise: Ideas, Interests, and the Politics of Constitution Making". The William and Mary Quarterly. 44 (3): 424–457. doi:10.2307/1939765. JSTOR 1939765.
