= A More Perfect Union (film) =

- DVD and video cover
- Directed by: Peter N. Johnson
- Screenplay by: Tim Slover
- Produced by: Peter N. Johnson; Nicholas J. Gasdik
- Edited by: Peter G. Czerny
- Music by: Kurt Bestor
- Production company: Brigham Young University
- Release date: 1989
- Running time: 112 minutes
- Country: United States
- Language: English

A More Perfect Union: America Becomes a Nation is a 1989 American feature film dramatizing the events of the U.S. Constitutional Convention of 1787. The film was produced by Brigham Young University to commemorate the 200th anniversary of the drafting of the United States Constitution.

A More Perfect Union is based primarily on the writings of James Madison and is told from his point of view. The movie follows Madison as he drafts the Virginia Plan and convinces George Washington to attend the Constitutional Convention. During the Convention, Madison is a key, persuasive leader as the delegates replace the Confederation Congress’ unicameral legislature with a federal government divided into legislative, executive, and judicial branches. They also take an initial step toward ending slavery in the new US system by stipulating that the "importation of slaves" cannot be prohibited before 1808. Finally, the delegates reach the "Great Compromise", establishing a bicameral Congress in which representation in the House of Representatives is based on population, while each state receives equal representation in the Senate. The movie concludes with the inauguration of George Washington as president in 1789.

The film was officially recognized by the Commission on the Bicentennial of the United States Constitution as "of exceptional merit".

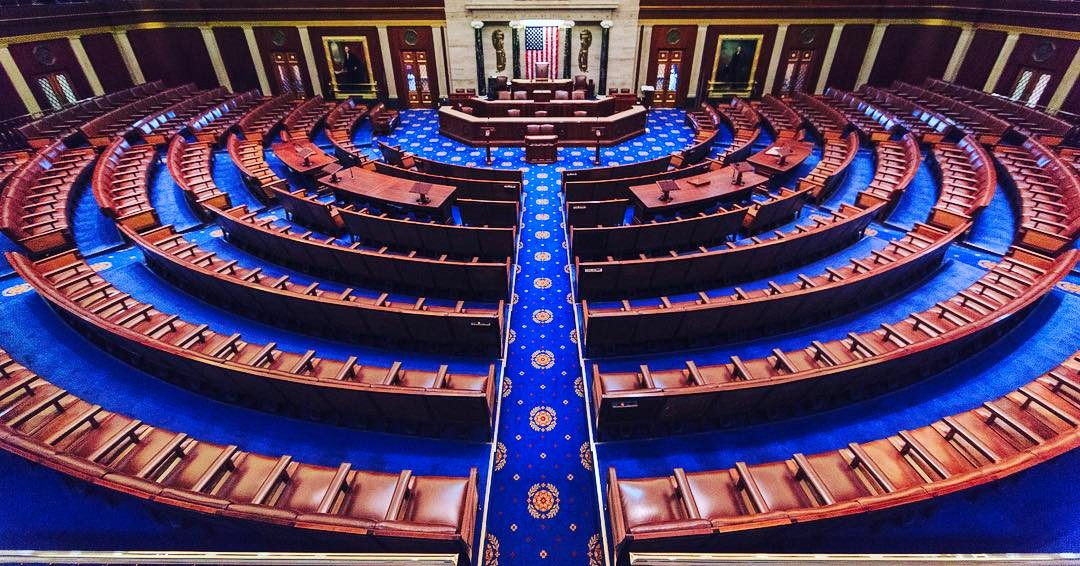
The 435 seats in the US House of Representatives are apportioned among the 50 states based on population. As of 2026, California (over 39 million people) has 52 representatives and Wyoming (just over half a million) has 1.

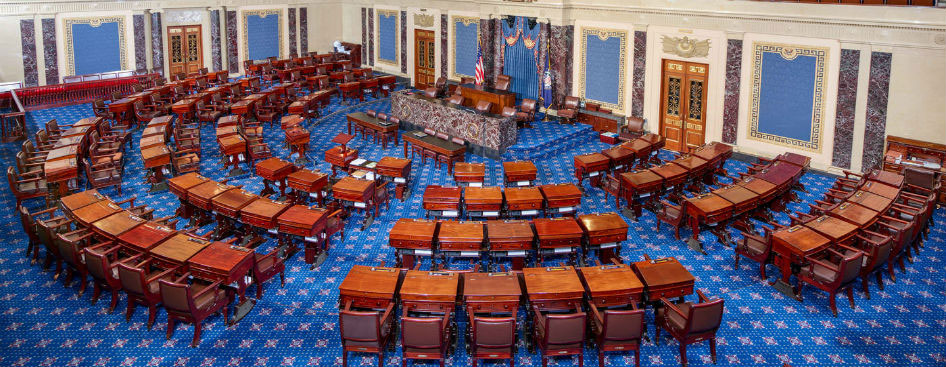
The 100 seats in the US Senate are allocated equally among the 50 states regardless of population. So, as of 2026, Texas (over 31 million people) has 2 senators and Vermont (just over half a million) also has 2.

== Plot summary ==
=== Before the Convention begins on May 25, 1787 ===
In 1786 James Madison is a young but influential lawmaker in Virginia’s House of Delegates. Madison sees mounting evidence that the newly-independent United States is governed poorly under the Articles of Confederation (the precursor to the Constitution). He and many others are alarmed in the autumn and winter of 1786-87 when farmers, debtors and tax protesters in western Massachusetts attempt to overthrow the Massachusetts state government and seize federal weapons to assist in the uprising. It is increasingly clear that a convention is needed to amend the Articles.

Madison confers with George Mason, the principal drafter of Virginia’s 1776 constitution. Mason advises Madison that the "indispensible" leader the country needs for a convention to succeed is George Washington, the Revolutionary War’s commanding general. The Confederation Congress approves a Constitutional Convention in Philadelphia, and, after significant uncertainty, Washington decides to attend.

Just before the Convention begins, the Virginia delegates (including Madison, Washington, Mason and Virginia’s governor, Edmund Randolph) meet in a Philadelphia tavern to discuss Madison’s proposed "Virginia Plan". The Plan calls for a new government composed of an executive, an independent judiciary, and a bicameral legislature where the more populous states have more representatives ("proportional representation") in both chambers.

=== During the Convention (May 25 to September 17, 1787) ===
The Convention officially convenes on May 25th and Edmund Randolph presents the Virginia Plan. The delegates agree to abolish the Articles of Confederation. They also debate whether states in confederation are superior to a large federal republic, with Madison asserting that "it is only in a large republic that good government is even possible". When (the movie character) John Dickinson (from small-population Delaware) calls proportional representation in the national legislature "tyranny", the Convention votes to temporarily postpone discussion of this controversial question.

They then turn to another divisive issue: slavery. John Rutledge and Charles Pinckney speak in favor of continuing the "importation of slaves". Rufus King, George Mason and others condemn slavery as immoral, but all are aware that squarely confronting the "iniquitous" slavery problem now will fracture the Convention. The delegates ultimately agree that "importation of slaves" will remain legal in the contemplated US system until 1808 (or two decades after the Convention). Madison’s voiceover states it was a foregone conclusion that the Convention would not further assail ongoing slavery in the US, but he concludes that it is a "blight" on the Convention and on the country.

On June 9th the smaller states begin proposing alternatives to proportional representation under the Virginia Plan; debate on this issue roils the Convention for more than a month. Dickinson and his fellow Delaware delegate, Gunning Bedford, both speak in favor of "equal suffrage" for the states. Madison and James Wilson of Pennsylvania oppose it. Roger Sherman (Connecticut) proposes the first version of the "Great Compromise" (also called the "Connecticut Compromise"): proportional representation in the lower house and one vote per state in the Senate. His proposal is voted down, but the idea of a "proportional-plus-equal" bicameral Congress takes root. The small state delegates and their allies offer William Paterson’ s "New Jersey Plan", which features a unicameral legislature with one vote per state. This plan is defeated, but the small states maintain their resolve.

When the Convention deadlocks on the representation issue in a binding 5-5 tie vote, Sherman suggests a committee to resolve the impasse. The resulting "Grand Committee" is composed largely of delegates (like Pennsylvania’s Benjamin Franklin) who have been urging compromise. After a recess, the committee duly recommends that the House of Representatives have proportional representation and the Senate have two senators per state, each with one vote.

The Convention holds a binding vote and accepts the Grand Committee’s recommended Congress where the populous states have more power in the House of Representatives and the smaller states have comparatively more in the Senate. The small state delegations rejoice at their victory, but many of the large state delegates (including Madison) are hesitant to accept the Great Compromise. After thinking it over during a recess, however, Madison decides "I am for the Compromise". He reasons that the Convention "has created a new kind of nation . . . . Its national government is strong and sovereign, but it has states which are also strong. Separate states, but a united people".

Madison’s narration states that when the Great Compromise was approved, "the key issue of the Convention was decided". He then recites a brief history of the Convention’s two final months, including the finalizing work of the Committee of Style. His voiceover adds, "I am especially fond of the the Preamble: not 'We the States', but 'We the People'".

When the final draft of the Constitution is ready, Washington presides over the Convention’s official vote. Initially each state’s delegation approves the document without incident. When Washington gets to Virginia the state casts an affirmative vote, but both George Mason and Edmund Randolph indicate that they will not sign as individuals. (The movie does not mention Elbridge Gerry as the Convention’s third holdout.) Randolph explains that he has "many reservations" (foreshadowing the state ratification debates held mostly from 1787 to 1788), and Mason says that his concern stems from the Constitution’s lack of "a declaration of rights" (foreshadowing the addition of the Bill of Rights by 1791). Washington completes the tally with all eleven "present" states consenting.

On September 17, 1787, 39 of the 42 delegates then-present sign the Constitution. Alexander Hamilton signs as an individual since New York no longer has enough delegates present to vote. As Madison signs, his voiceover says that "the degree of concord that ultimately prevailed was a miracle".

=== Washington is sworn in as president (April 30, 1789) ===
A year and a half after the Convention ends, Washington takes the presidential oath of office standing on the balcony of Federal Hall in New York City (then the capital of the US). Washington and Madison shake hands, and Madison exclaims "'Tis done! We are a nation!"

== Cast ==
- Craig Wasson ... James Madison
- Michael McGuire ... George Washington
- Fredd Wayne ... Benjamin Franklin
- Morgan White ... George Mason
- Douglas Seale ... Lord Carmarthen
- Bruce Newbold ... Edmund Randolph
- James Walsh ... James Wilson (as James Walch)
- Ivan Crosland ... John Adams
- H.E.D. Redford ... Roger Sherman
- Jesse Bennett ... John Dickinson
- Roderick Cook ... Nathaniel Gorham
- Derryl Yeager ... Alexander Hamilton
- James Arrington ... Gouverneur Morris
- Steve Anderson ... Elbridge Gerry
- Dick Cheatham ... Williams
- Richard Dutcher ... Charles Pinckney
- Bruce Eaton ... Richard Henry Lee
- Vince O'Neil ... John Langdon
- Marvin Payne ... Rufus King
- Scott Wilkinson ... Thomas Jefferson
- Lael Woodbury ... George Wythe
- Scott Bronson ... Robert Morris
- Fred Laycock ... Caleb Strong
- Wayne Brennan ... Oliver Ellsworth
- Dave Blackwell ... Robert Livingston

== Production notes ==
The screenplay for A More Perfect Union is based mostly on the writings of James Madison, including his Convention notes which were published after his death as Notes of Debates in the Federal Convention of 1787.

The movie was filmed on location at Independence Hall in Philadelphia, in Williamsburg, Virginia, and at other historical sites. Many professors from BYU's School of Fine Arts and Communications were involved in its production either as actors or in other capacities.

== See also ==
(Wikipedia articles)

- Founding Fathers of the United States
- List of films about the American Revolution
- Signing of the United States Constitution
- Federalist No. 10 - Wikipedia article for James Madison's highly-regarded Federalist essay. Federalist No. 10 discusses how large republics can help control the effects of faction.

(Wikisource documents)

- The Articles of Confederation - Full text of the first United States governing document; in effect from March 1, 1781 to March 4, 1789.
- Original Virginia Plan - Full text of the plan presented by Edmund Randolph on May 29, 1787, during the Convention’s first week.
- New Jersey Plan - Full text of the "small state" plan presented by William Paterson to the Convention on June 15th.
- Virginia Plan as modified by the Great Compromise - Resolutions adopted on July 26th giving the populous states more representatives in the House of Representatives and all states an equal number of representatives in the Senate.
- Draft Version of the Constitution - The Convention’s rough draft of the Constitution as it existed on August 6th after more than two months of negotiation and debate.
- Constitution of the United States - Complete text of the final Constitution signed by 39 of the 42 then-present delegates on September 17, 1787.
- The United States Bill of Rights (1789 version) - Passed by the new Congress on September 25, 1789 with twelve articles. Ten were ratified by the states in 1791 and constitute the first ten amendments to the Constitution.
