= Outline of government =

The following outline is provided as an overview of and topical guide to government:

Government – system or group of people governing an organized community, generally a state.

In the case of its broad associative definition, government normally consists of legislature, executive, and judiciary. Government is a means by which organizational policies are enforced, as well as a mechanism for determining policy. In many countries, the government has a kind of constitution, a statement of its governing principles and philosophy.

While all types of organizations have governance, the term government is often used more specifically to refer to the approximately 200 independent national governments and subsidiary organizations.

== Government and the State ==
=== What is government? ===
Government - is a general term which can be used to refer to public bodies organizing the political life of the society. Government can also refer to the collective head of the executive branch of power in a polity.

Public policies -

- Public taxation
- Public defense
- Public education
- Public transportation
- Healthcare
- Environment
- Civil rights
- Working conditions

Legislative power -

Executive power -

Judicial power -

Constitution -

=== The State ===
Five characteristics of a state

- Population
- Territory
- Sovereignty
- Government
- Permanence

=== Major Political Ideas ===
Evolutionary Theory -

Social Contract Theory -

Divine Theory -

Meritocracy -

=== The Purpose of Government ===
Form a More Perfect Union -

Establish Justice -

Insure Domestic Tranquility -

Provide for the Common Defense -

Promote the General Welfare -

Secure the Blessings of Liberty -

== History of government ==
History of government

=== Origins of American Government ===
==== Our Political Beginnings ====
===== Basic concepts of Government =====
Ordered government

Limited government

Representative government

===== Landmark English Documents =====
Magna Carta

Petition of Right

English Bill of Rights

===== English Colonies =====
Charter

Royal Colonies - New Hampshire, Massachusetts, New York, New Jersey, Virginia, North Carolina, South Carolina, and Georgia

- Council
- Bicameralism

Proprietary colonies - Maryland, Pennsylvania, Delaware

- Unicameralism

Charter colonies - Connecticut and Rhode Island

==== The Coming of Independence ====
New England Confederation

Albany Plan of Union

Delegate

Boycott

Repeal

Popular sovereignty

Declaration of Independence

==== Critical Period ====
Articles of Confederation

Ratification

Presiding Officer

==== Creating and Ratifying the Constitution ====
Framers of the Constitution -

Virginia Plan -

New Jersey Plan -

Connecticut Compromise -

Three-Fifths Compromise -

Slave Trade Compromise -

Federalists -

Anti-Federalists -

Quorum -

== Forms of government ==
=== Who Can Participate ===
Democracy -

Dictatorship -

- Autocracy -
- Oligarchy -

=== Geographic Distribution of Power ===
Unitary government -

Federal government -

Confederate government (Confederation) -

=== Relationship Between Legislative and Executive Powers ===
Presidential government -

Parliamentary government -

== Basic Concepts of Democracy ==
=== Foundations ===
Popular sovereignty Limited government Human equality

=== Democracy and the Free Enterprise System ===
Free enterprise system -

Law of supply and demand -

Mixed economy -

== The Constitution ==
=== Six Basic Principles ===
Preamble

Articles

==== Basic Principles ====
Popular Sovereignty

Limited Government

- Constitutionalism
- Rule of law

Separation of powers

Checks and balances

- Veto

Judicial review

- Unconstitutional

Federalism

== Legislature ==
Chambers

   Unicameralism
   Multicameralism
   Bicameralism
   Tricameralism
   Tetracameralism

   Upper house (Senate)
   Lower house

Parliament

   Parliamentary system
   Parliamentary group
   Member of Parliament
   International parliament

Parliamentary procedure

   Committee
   Quorum
   Motion (no-confidence)

Types

   Congress (Member of Congress)
   City council (Councillor)
   The Estates

Legislator -

Committee member -

Trustee -

Delegate -

Partisan -

Politico -

Senator -

Money
