= Hidden universe =

Hidden universe or variation, may refer to:

- The Hidden Universe (1950 book) a science fiction anthology by Ralph Milne Farley
- The Hidden Universe (novella) a science fiction story by Ralph Milne Farley, originally published in Amazing Stories magazine, featured in his anthology Strange Worlds (Ralph Milne Farley collection)
- Hidden Universe 3D (film) a 2013 Australian IMAX3D documentary film about deep space

== See also ==
- Hidden (disambiguation)
- Universe (disambiguation)
- The Hidden Reality (book) 2011 physics book by Brian Greene
- Hidden sector (physics), the hidden part of the universe
- Hidden-variable theory (physics) of the universe
- Dark universe (disambiguation)
