= Jon Arfstrom =

American artist

- Born: John Douglas Arfstrom; 11 November 1928; Superior, Wisconsin
- Died: 2 December 2015 (aged 87); Anoka, Minnesota
- Known for: Cover art, fantasy art, surrealism, watercolor, portraiture
- Awards: Bram Stoker Award, 1994
- Website: Jon Arfstrom Collection at the Anoka Historical Society

Jon Arfstrom (November 11, 1928 – December 2, 2015) was an American artist of imaginative realism known for his fantastical works in the fantasy and horror genres, active both in the late pulp fiction era of the 1950s, with his Weird Tales cover art and interior illustration work, and then again in science fiction publishing in the 1980s, for his mature cover work, for which he received a Bram Stoker Award in 1994.

An accomplished watercolorist, Arfstrom combined his public life as a commercial artist, with its focus on Americana, with a private, surreal, imaginative world, expressed in his many notebooks and journals.

== Early life ==
Arfstrom was born in Superior, Wisconsin. His parents were immigrants from Sweden; his father, Fred Arfstrom, a painter and "jack-of-all-trades," his mother, Thyra Westlund Arfstrom, a chef. His early years were spent in the lake city of Duluth, Minnesota. Too young for service in World War II, Arfstrom lied about his age and went work on board the big Great Lakes freighters and excursion ships, where he "sold beverages and did portraits of passengers." By sixteen, the hard-working teenager was a freight foreman.

From his early teenaged years, Arfstrom began to send his work to the magazines he enjoyed to read, seeking sales and commissions. He married at 18, to young bride Norma Siegford (16), in November 1945.

The couple weathered some financially difficult years while Arfstrom established himself as a commercial artist, independent of his science fiction work. He was hired as an advertisement illustrator for the Gamble-Skogmo company in 1950. This would establish the first of "two very different lines of artistic work that would remain as mostly-separate threads throughout the rest of his life." He quickly gained a solid reputation as a fine watercolorist and portraitist in the realist mode preferred by of the magazines of the day.

Arfstrom considered himself a self-taught artist, although he sought out systematic exposure to the technical fundamentals through study with the Famous Artists School correspondence course, founded by the New York Society of Illustrators with the participation of Norman Rockwell, and, later, with coursework at the Minnesota School of Art.

== Career ==
=== The pulps ===
Arfstrom began, very early, to submit cover art and illustrations to 'the pulps', the magazines that were publishing science fiction and fantasy stories during this period. He had some early successes, selling interior illustrations, then, in January of 1952, Dorothy McIlwraith, Weird Tales's editor, bought what would be the first of three covers he created for the magazine. McIlwraith liked Arfstrom's work so well that she continued to use him on a regular basis for the magazine's interior illustrations.

H. P. Lovecraft, Robert Bloch, and Frank Belknap were among the best known of the authors whose stories Arfstrom illustrated for Weird Tales during these years.

Unfortunately for Arfstrom's early career as a freelance magazine artist, Weird Tales folded in 1954, a reflection of a more general decline in magazine sales in that genre in the post-war period.

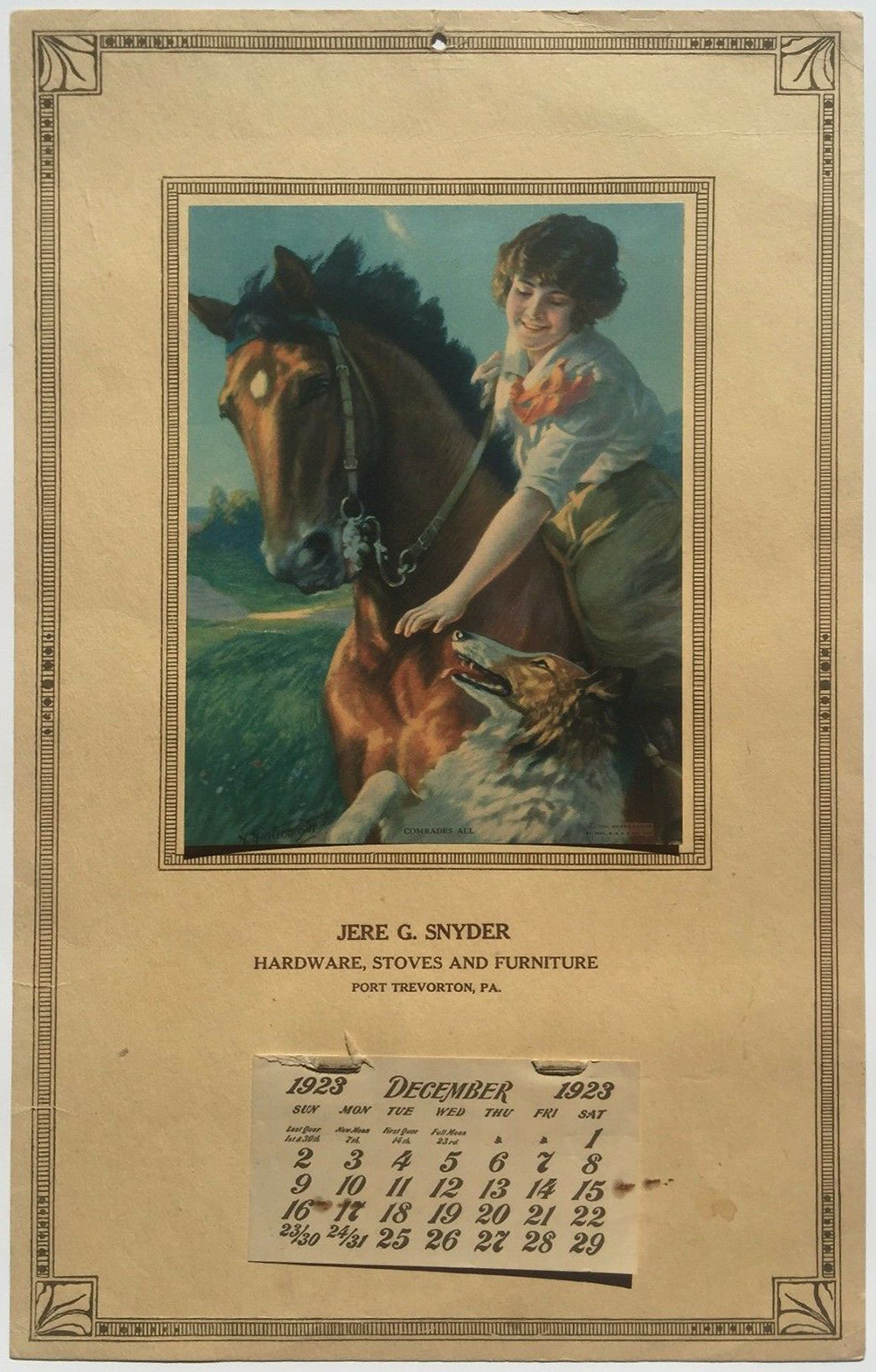
Brown & Bigelow Commercial Calendar, 1923

=== Staff illustrator at Brown & Bigelow ===
Arfstrom was hired as a staff illustrator by the Saint Paul, Minnesota publishing company Brown & Bigelow in 1956, where he continued with his portrait work and, in the earlier years, helped prepare Norman Rockwell’s paintings for publication on the company’s popular commercial calendars. At the time, the firm retained a substantial department of illustrators and graphic designers. Arfstrom would remain at Brown & Bigelow for the next forty years, witness to staff changes as printing technologies and public fashions moved on. He "was always afraid he'd be laid off," but his easy technical mastery of illustration and pleasant manner kept him in full-time employment until his retirement in 1996.

=== Watercolor ===
Arfstrom continued to work independently in his own time, both in his fantastic work and in more conventional genres. In 1975 he and several others founded the Northstar Watercolor Society (now the NorthStar Watermedia Society for which he served as president 1979-81.

=== Mature work ===
He returned to the horror field in the 1990s and won a prestigious Stoker Award — "considered the Pulitzer Prize of horror lit" — in 1994 for his illustration work on “The Early Fears,” a collection of vintage stories by Robert Bloch.

== Notable illustrations in print ==
=== Covers ===
- The Dark Other by Stanley G. Weinbaum (Fantasy Publishing Company, 1950)
- The Omnibus of Time by Ralph Milne Farley (Fantasy Publishing Company, 1950)
- Fantasy Advertiser, Vol. 4, No. 4 (Sept. 1950)
- Weird Tales (Jan 1952)
- Weird Tales (Jul 1952)
- Weird Tales (Sep 1953)
- Spacetrails #5 (1953)
- Etchings & Odysseys #3 (1983)
- The Devil Made Me Do It by Paul Dale Anderson (Miskatonic University Press, 1985)
- Colossus: The Collected Science Fiction of Donald Wandrei (Fedogan & Bremer, 1989)
- Smoke of the Snake by Carl Jacobi (Fedogan & Bremer (1994)
- The Early Fears by Robert Bloch (Fedogan & Bremer, 1994)
- Don't Dream: The Collected Fantasy and Horror of Donald Wandrei (Fedogan & Bremer, 1997)
- Tales of the Unanticipated (Minnesota Science Fiction Society, Winter/Spring/Summer 1997)
- Kaldar: World of Antares by Edmond Hamilton (plus frontispiece, Haffner Press, 1998)
- The Vampire Master and Other Tales of Terror by Edmond Hamilton (Haffner Press, 2000)
- Swedish Lutheran Vampires of Brainerd by Anne Waltz (Sidecar Preservation Society, 2001)
- Scream Quietly: The Best of Charles L. Grant (PS Publishing, 2012

== Gallery: cover art ==
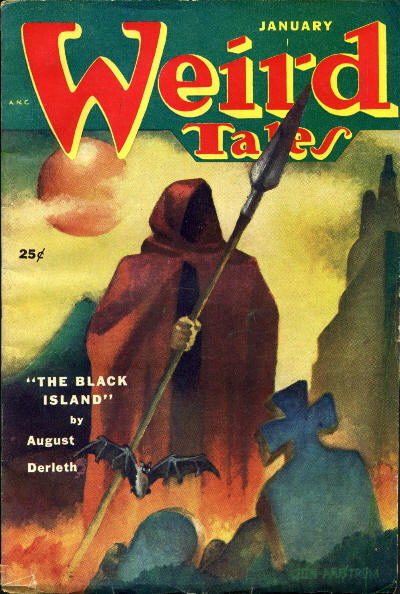
Jon Arfstrom, Weird Tales (Jan 1952)

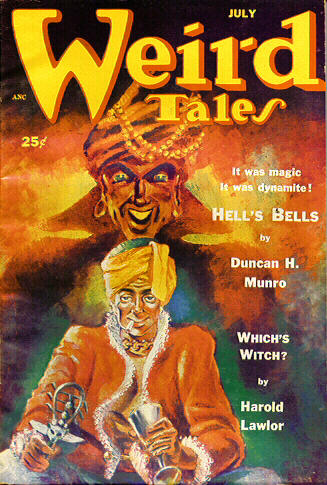
Jon Arfstrom, Weird Tales (Jul 1952)

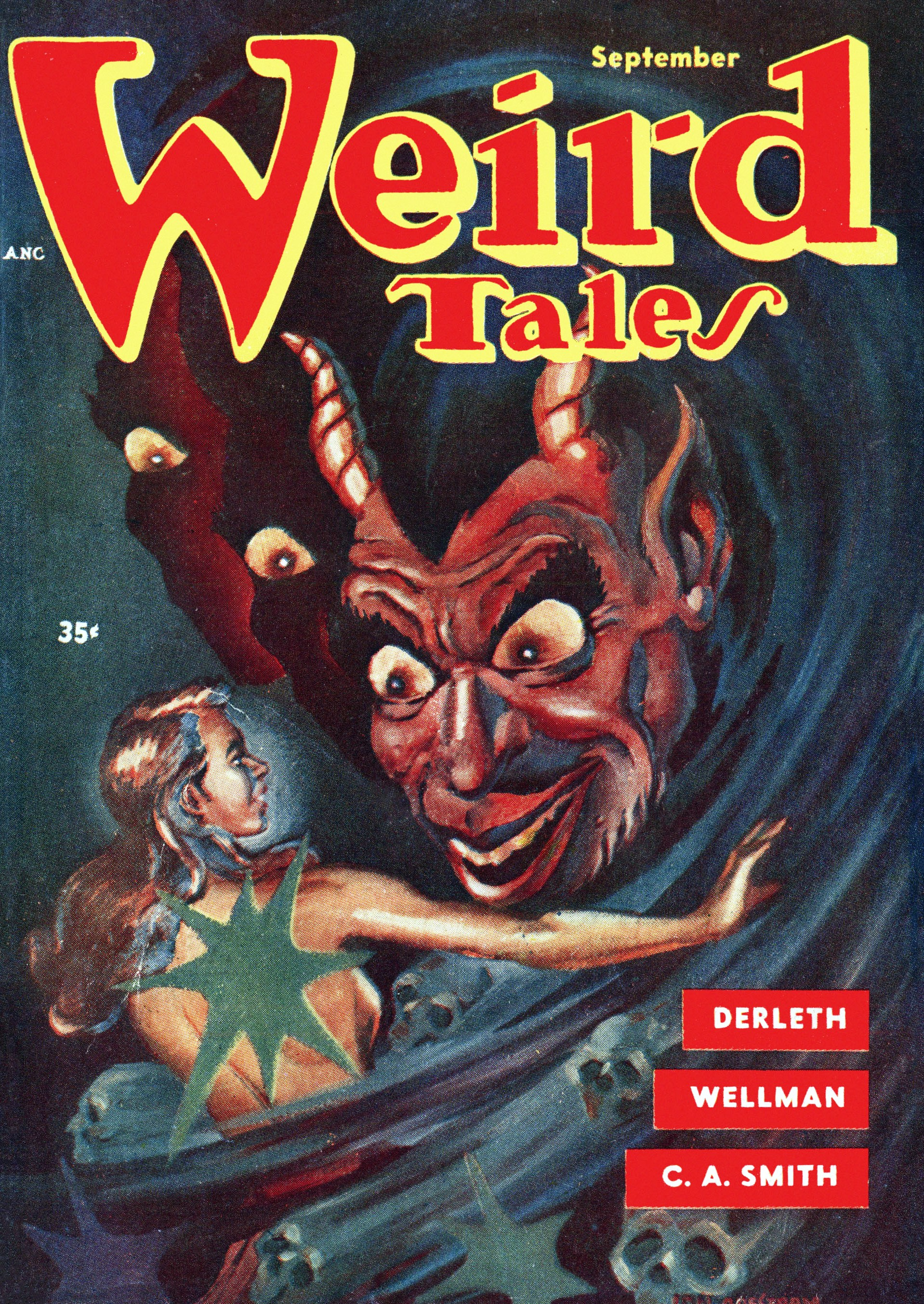
Jon Arfstrom, Weird Tales (Sep 1953)
