= Dark universe =

Dark universe may refer to:

== Science ==
- Portion of the universe not directly observable, including dark energy and dark matter
- Dark Universe Observatory (DUO), a planned NASA space telescope
- Dark Universe Explorer (DUNE), an ESA space telescope

== Entertainment ==
- Dark Universe (novel), a 1961 science fiction novel by Daniel F. Galouye
- Dark Universe (film), a 1993 science-fiction film directed by Steve Latshaw
- The Dark Universe (film), a planned DC Comics comic book film based on Justice League Dark
- Dark Universe (franchise), a canceled shared universe announced by Universal Pictures, intended to be a reboot of Universal Monsters
  - Dark Universe (Universal Epic Universe), a Universal Monsters–themed area at the Universal Epic Universe theme park

== See also ==
- Hidden sector (physics) of the universe; the dark universe
- Heat death of the universe, when the universe goes dark in the future
- Dark Ages (cosmology), before the universe lit up in the past
- Universe (disambiguation)
- Dark (disambiguation)
- Hidden universe (disambiguation)
