= Strange Worlds (Ralph Milne Farley collection) =

- Dust-jacket from the first edition
- Author: Ralph Milne Farley
- Cover artist: Walter
- Language: English
- Genre: Science fiction
- Publisher: Fantasy Publishing Company, Inc.
- Publication date: 1953
- Publication place: United States
- Media type: Print (hardback)
- Pages: 311 pp

Strange Worlds is a collection of science fiction by Ralph Milne Farley. Consisting of one novel and two shorter novellas, it was first published in 1953 by Fantasy Publishing Company, Inc. in an edition of 300 copies. The book is an omnibus of Farley's earlier books, The Radio Man and The Hidden Universe. The novel was originally serialized in the magazine Argosy and the novellas originally appeared in the magazine Amazing Stories.

== Contents ==
- The Radio Man
- "The Hidden Universe"
- "We, the Mist"
