= Roger Sherman Hoar =

Politician and writer

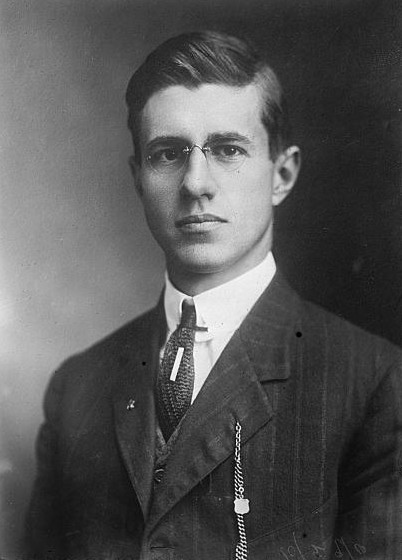

Member of the Massachusetts State Senate from the 5th Middlesex District
- In office 1911

Personal details
- Born: April 8, 1887 Waltham, Massachusetts, U.S.
- Died: October 10, 1963 (aged 76)
- Party: Democratic Party
- Parent: Sherman Hoar (father)
- Relatives: Ebenezer R. Hoar (grandfather); Samuel Hoar (great-grandfather); Roger Sherman (great-great-grandfather)
- Education: Phillips Exeter Academy; Harvard University (1909); Harvard Law School (1911)
- Occupation: Politician, author
- Writing career
- Pen name: Ralph Milne Farley
- Subject: Science fiction
- Notable works: The Radio Man; The Hidden Universe; The Omnibus of Time; Strange Worlds

Roger Sherman Hoar (April 8, 1887 – October 10, 1963) was an American state senator and assistant Attorney General, for the state of Massachusetts. He wrote and published science fiction under the pseudonym of Ralph Milne Farley.

== Family ==
Hoar was the son of Sherman Hoar, grandson of former US Attorney General Ebenezer Rockwood Hoar, great-grandson of Samuel Hoar, and great-great-grandson of American founding father Roger Sherman, a signer of the Declaration of Independence.

== Education and career ==
Born in Waltham, Massachusetts, Hoar attended Phillips Exeter Academy. He then received his bachelor's degree from Harvard University in 1909 and his law degree from Harvard Law School in 1911. During World War I, he served in the United States Army Coast Artillery Corps. Hoar was a former Massachusetts assistant attorney general. He was a member of the Marquette University faculty in the graduate school of engineering, and also "taught scientific subjects at Harvard, the Coast Artillery School, [and] the Ordnance School of Application". He also served as attorney of Bucyrus Erie Company of South Milwaukee, Wisconsin.

== Politician ==
Hoar served in the Massachusetts State Senate in 1911 and was involved with the Democratic Party and campaigned for women's suffrage. Hoar was also an organizer and major force behind the enactment of the Employee Unemployment Benefits Act, served on the commission to Compile Information & Data, 1917, taught mathematics and engineering, patented a system for aiming large guns by the stars, and authored landmark works on constitutional and patent law.

== Writer ==
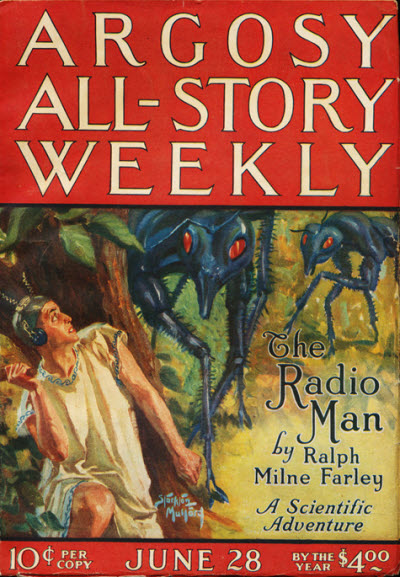
The first installment of Hoar's novel The Radio Man took the cover of the June 1924 issue of Argosy All-Story Weekly.

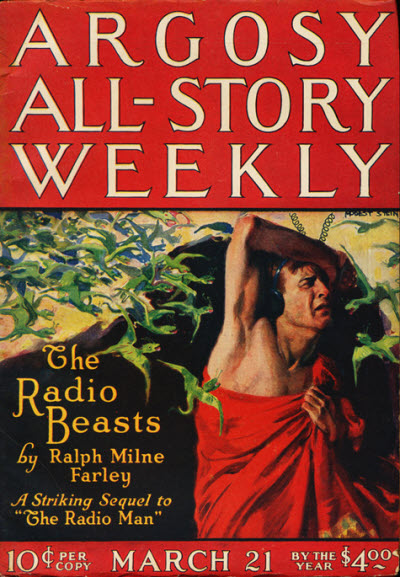
The Radio Beasts, Argosy All-Story Weekly, March 1925

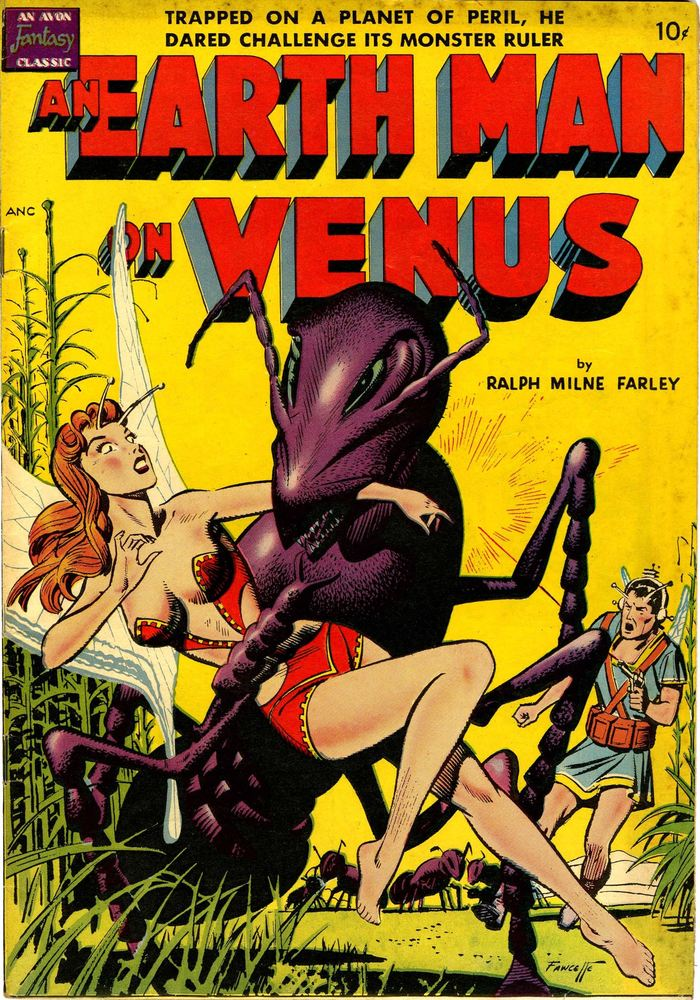
Cover of 1950 Avon comic adaptation of The Radio Man, art by Gene Fawcette

Under the pseudonym Ralph Milne Farley, Hoar wrote a considerable amount of pulp-magazine science fiction during the period between the world wars, appearing in such publications as Argosy All-Story Weekly and Amazing Stories, as well as occasional essays for The American Mercury, Scientific American, and science fiction fanzines. His works include The Radio Man and its numerous sequels, chiefly interplanetary and inner-world adventure yarns in the tradition of Edgar Rice Burroughs, with whom he was friends; Hoar also wrote a number of archetypal time-travel-paradox tales, collected in book form as The Omnibus of Time, and "The House of Ecstasy", which has been frequently reprinted since its initial appearance in Weird Tales (April 1938).

According to one of his editors, from 1932 on, the "Farley" byline was actually used exclusively for collaboration between Hoar and his daughter Caroline, who had been writing under the pen name of Jacqueline Farley and by 1933 was an engineering student at Radcliffe.

Upon relocating to the Midwest, where he worked as a corporate attorney for the firm of Bucyrus-Erie, Hoar joined the Milwaukee Fictioneers, whose members included Stanley G. Weinbaum, Robert Bloch, and Raymond A. Palmer. When Chicago-based Ziff-Davis Publishing Company bought the ailing Amazing Stories in 1938, Hoar was offered, but declined, the magazine's editorship and recommended Palmer, who held the position through the 1940s.

== Books ==
=== As Roger Sherman Hoar ===
- The Tariff Manual. Privately printed, 1912.
- Constitutional Conventions: Their Nature, Powers, and Limitations. Boston: Little, Brown, and Company, 1917.
- Patents: What a Business Executive Should Know About Patents. New York: The Ronald Press Company, 1926. Revised edition: Patent Tactics and Law. 1935, 1950.
- Conditional Sales: Law and Local Practices for Executive and Lawyer. New York: The Ronald Press Company, 1929. Revised edition: 1937.
- Unemployment Insurance in Wisconsin. South Milwaukee, Wisconsin: Stuart Press, 1932. Revised edition: Wisconsin Unemployment Insurance, 1934.

=== As Ralph Milne Farley ===
- Smothered Seas (story, with Stanley G. Weinbaum). Published in Astounding Stories, January 1936.
- Dangerous Love (stories). London: Utopian Publications, 1946.
- The Immortals (novel). Published in The Argosy in 1934, later reprinted in Canada by Popular Publications Inc., 1947.
- The Radio Man (novel), 1924. Los Angeles: Fantasy Publishing Co., 1948. Paperback edition retitled An Earthman on Venus (Avon Books). [1st of "Radio Man" series]
- The Hidden Universe (two novellas). Los Angeles: Fantasy Publishing Co., 1950.
- The Omnibus of Time (stories). Los Angeles: Fantasy Publishing Co., 1950.
- Strange Worlds (contains The Radio Man and The Hidden Universe). Los Angeles: Fantasy Publishing Co., 1953.
- The Radio Beasts (novel), 1925. New York: Ace Books, 1964. [2nd of "Radio Man" series]
- The Radio Planet (novel), 1926. New York: Ace Books, 1964. [3rd of "Radio Man" series]
- The Radio Flyers (novel), 1929. Rialto, California: Pulpville Press, 2006.
- The Radio Gun-Runners (novel), 1930. [sequel to "The Radio Flyers"]
- Tong War (novel, written in collaboration with E. Hoffman Price). Chertsey, England: Blue Mushroom, 2002.
- Pe-Ra, Daughter of the Sun (novella). Rialto, California: Pulpville Press, 2005.
- The Radio Minds of Mars (novel), 1955. Rialto, California: Pulpville Press, 2005. [4th of "Radio Man" series]
- The Ralph Milne Farley Collection Book 1 (stories). Rialto, California: Pulpville Press, 2005.
- The Ralph Milne Farley Collection Book 2 (stories). Rialto, California: Pulpville Press, 2005.
- The Golden City (novel), 1933. Rialto, California: Pulpville Press, 2006.
- The Radio War (novel), 1932. Rialto, California: Pulpville Press, 2006.
- The Radio Menace (novel), 1930. Rialto, California: Pulpville Press, 2008. [5th of "Radio Man" series]
