= The Omnibus of Time =

- Dust-jacket from the first edition
- Author: Ralph Milne Farley
- Cover artist: Jon Arfstrom
- Language: English
- Genre: Science fiction
- Publisher: Fantasy Publishing Company, Inc.
- Publication date: 1950
- Publication place: United States
- Media type: Print (hardback)
- Pages: 331 pp
- OCLC: 1809501

The Omnibus of Time is a collection of science fiction short stories by Ralph Milne Farley. It was first published in 1950 by Fantasy Publishing Company, Inc. in an edition of 1,500 copies. An additional 500 copies were bound as a Gnome Press edition and sold through an associated book club. Most of the stories originally appeared in the magazines Top-Notch, Amazing Stories, Thrilling Wonder Stories, Weird Tales, Argosy, Fantasy Book and Science Fiction Digest.

== Contents ==
- "The Man Who Met Himself"
- "Time for Sale"
- "Rescue Into the Past"
- "The Immortality of Alan Whidden"
- "The Time-Wise Guy"
- "A Month a Minute"
- "The Invisible Bomber"
- "The Time Traveller"
- "I Killed Hitler"
- "The Radio War" (excerpt)
- "The Golden City" (excerpt)
- "The Hidden Universe" (excerpt)
- "Stranded in Time"
- "The Man Who Lived Backwards"
- "The Revenge of the Great White Lodge"
- "The Man Who Could Turn Back the Clock"
- "The End of the World"
- "After Math" (essay)

Farley revised stories to eliminate "many mathematico-physical footnotes", which he compiled and rewrote as "After Math", presenting "the various scientific theories of time, and compar[ing] all my own various inconsistent theories and techniques". While "The Golden City" was described as excerpted from a soon-to-be published novel, the full-length work did not appear until 2006.

== Reception ==
New York Times reviewer Basil Davenport reported that "Readers who enjoy mathematical paradoxes, as well as those who enjoy science fiction, will find this good entertainment."
