= Notes of Debates in the Federal Convention of 1787 =

James Madison's notes on the Philadelphia Constitutional Convention

Notes of Debates in the Federal Convention of 1787 was James Madison's record of the daily debates held by delegates at the Philadelphia Convention, which resulted in the drafting of the current United States Constitution. Madison's journal describing what delegates said remains valuable to historians, as it is one of historians' few sources of information on the proceedings at present-day Independence Hall during the summer of 1787, which, despite the summer heat, had its windows shut so that those outside could not hear what was being said. Delegates were forbidden to leak the proceedings to the public.

== Background ==
Madison, a delegate from Virginia and future President of the United States, who due to his role in creating the Virginia Plan became known as the "Father of the Constitution", purposely sat up front, stating in the preface to his notes that "in pursuance of the task I had assumed I chose a seat in front of the presiding member, with the other members on my right & left hands. In this favorable position for hearing all that passed, I noted in terms legible & in abbreviations & marks intelligible to myself what was read from the Chair or spoken by the members; and losing not a moment unnecessarily between the adjournment & reassembling of the Convention I was enabled to write out my daily notes...."

Madison also avoided any long absences from the meetings, so as not to miss what was said: "It happened, also that I was not absent a single day, nor more than a casual fraction of an hour in any day, so that I could not have lost a single speech, unless a very short one."

== Legacy ==
When Madison's notes were published after his death, they became an issue for abolitionists. According to historian James Oakes, "Opponents of slavery were gratified by the publication in 1840 of James Madison's notes from the Constitutional Convention, which they believed supported their antislavery constitutionalism."

== See also ==
- A More Perfect Union, a 1989 film that uses much of the language and reporting found in Madison's notes.
- Timeline of drafting and ratification of the United States Constitution
