= Dark Universe Observatory =

The Dark Universe Observatory (DUO) was a planned NASA space-based telescope. It was intended to conduct observations of galaxy clusters in the X-ray range with the intent of obtaining data related to both dark matter and energy. The project was an Explorers class mission originally meant to go into a 600 km Earth orbit. The telescope concept was eventually superseded by WFIRST.
