= Council of Revision =

The Council of Revision was, under the provisions of the Constitution of the U.S. State of New York of 1777, the legal body that revised all new legislation made by the New York State Legislature. It had the power to veto any legislation but its veto could be overridden by a two-thirds majority in each house of the legislature. The council was abolished by the New York State Constitutional Convention of 1821.

== Composition ==
The Council of Revision was composed by "the Governor, the Chancellor, and the Justices of the Supreme Court, or any two of them". The governor presided but, only if the other members' vote was tied, cast the deciding vote.

== Functions ==
The Constitution said that "all bills which have passed the Senate and the Assembly shall, before they become laws, be presented to the said Council for their revisal and consideration; and if ... it should appear improper to the said Council, or a majority of them, that the said bill become a law of this State, that they return the same, together with their objections thereto in writing, to the Senate or House of Assembly, in whichsoever the same shall have originated, who shall ... proceed to reconsider the said bill." The bill could then be enacted as law, over the objections of the council, by a two-thirds majority in each house of the legislature.

The whole number of bills passed by the legislature under this constitution was 6,590. The Council of Revision objected to 128, of which 17 were passed notwithstanding these objections.

== Abolition ==
The Council of Revision was abolished by the New York State Constitutional Convention of 1821. At the time of its abolition, the members were Governor DeWitt Clinton, Chancellor James Kent, Chief Justice Ambrose Spencer, and Associated Justices Joseph C. Yates, Jonas Platt, William W. Van Ness and John Woodworth.

Since the abolition of the Council of Revision, the power of veto to new legislation has been vested in the governor alone, whose veto can be overridden by a two-thirds majority in the state legislature.

== Proposal for the U.S. Constitution ==
At the U.S. Constitutional Convention in 1787, the Virginia Plan contained a similar Council of Revision for the national government. It would have been composed of the national executive (the President) and some number of the national judiciary, who jointly would have the power to veto bills from the national legislature. Although this idea was repeatedly pressed for by James Madison and James Wilson, it was narrowly defeated at the convention. Some were concerned that it would have given the judiciary too much power over the legislature, since they also expected federal judges to have the power to overturn unconstitutional laws by judicial review. Instead, the veto power was granted to the President as suggested by Alexander Hamilton in Federalist No. 69, which cites New York's Council of Revision.

== See also ==
- Council of Appointment
