= The Radio Man =

1924 novel by Ralph Milne Farley

- Dust-jacket from the first edition
- Author: Ralph Milne Farley
- Illustrator: O. G. Estes, Jr.
- Cover artist: Jack Gaughan
- Language: English
- Series: Radio Man
- Genre: Science fiction
- Publisher: Fantasy Publishing Company, Inc.
- Publication date: 1924 in Argosy, 1948 as a novel
- Publication place: United States
- Media type: Print (Hardback)
- Pages: 177
- OCLC: 1293452
- Followed by: The Radio Beasts

The Radio Man is a science fiction novel by American writer Ralph Milne Farley. It is the first book in Farley's Radio Man series. The novel was originally serialized from the June 28, 1924 issue of Argosy. It was first published in book form in 1948 by Fantasy Publishing Company, Inc. in an edition of 1,000 copies. Modern publishers often release The Radio Man under the title An Earth Man on Venus.

== Plot introduction ==
The novel concerns electrical engineer Myles Cabot, who disappears from his home in Boston while performing an experiment. He finds himself transported to the planet Venus where he is captured by the Formians, a race of ant-like creatures. After learning of the Cupians, a human-like race that is subservient to the Formians, Cabot escapes and falls in love with the Cupian princess Lilla. He goes on to introduce the Cupians to gunpowder and leads them in a revolt against their Formian masters.

== Adaptations ==
Wally Wood illustrated a 26-page adaptation of the story in a one-shot comic book entitled An Earth Man on Venus for Avon Periodicals in 1951, with cover by Gene Fawcette. The story was reprinted in Strange Planets #11 from I.W. Enterprises in the early 1960s. with cover by Ross Andru and Mike Esposito.

== See also ==
- Planetary romance
- Venus in fiction

== Sources ==
- Chalker, Jack L.; Mark Owings (1998). The Science-Fantasy Publishers: A Bibliographic History, 1923-1998. Westminster, MD and Baltimore: Mirage Press, Ltd. p. 269.
- Crawford, Jr., Joseph H.; James J. Donahue & Donald M. Grant (1953). "333", A Bibliography of the Science-Fantasy Novel. Providence, RI: The Grandon Company. p. 28. OCLC 3924496.
- Tuck, Donald H. (1974). The Encyclopedia of Science Fiction and Fantasy. Chicago: Advent. p. 224. ISBN 0-911682-20-1.
