= Political science in the United States =

History of an academic discipline

Political science has a long tradition within the United States, and has played a role that has been described as "hegemonic" within the discipline. Individuals from the country have made a disproportionate contribution upon current research. According to a 2014 article by Foreign Policy, almost all present top scholars in international relations possess American citizenship. Influential political scientists from the country include Alexander Wendt, Gene Sharp, John Mearsheimer, Zbigniew Brzezinski, Joseph Nye, Robert Jervis and Kenneth Waltz.

== History ==
=== Origins ===
Political science emerged as a distinct academic discipline in the United States during the 1880s.
