= Roger Sherman =

American lawyer, statesman, and Founding Father (1721–1793)

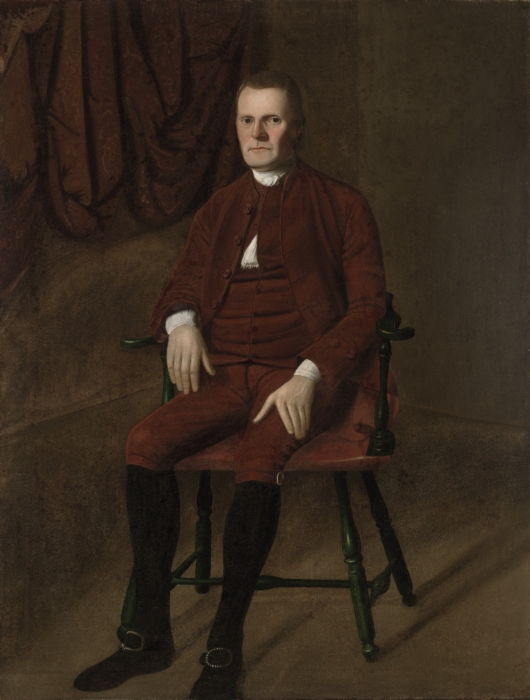
- Portrait by Ralph Earl, c. 1775

United States Senator from Connecticut
- In office June 13, 1791 – July 23, 1793
- Preceded by: William S. Johnson
- Succeeded by: Stephen M. Mitchell

Member of the U.S. House of Representatives from Connecticut's at-large district
- In office March 4, 1789 – March 3, 1791
- Preceded by: Position established
- Succeeded by: Amasa Learned

Member of the Confederation Congress from Connecticut
- In office 1784–1784

Delegate to the Continental Congress from Connecticut
- In office 1774–1781

1st Mayor of New Haven, Connecticut
- In office 1784–1793
- Preceded by: Position established
- Succeeded by: Samuel Bishop

Personal details
- Born: April 19, 1721 Newton, Province of Massachusetts, British America
- Died: July 23, 1793 (aged 72) New Haven, Connecticut, U.S.
- Resting place: Grove Street Cemetery; New Haven
- Party: Pro-Administration
- Spouse(s): Elizabeth Hartwell (m. 1749; died 1760) Rebecca Minot Prescott (m. 1763)
- Children: 15
- Profession: Politician, lawyer
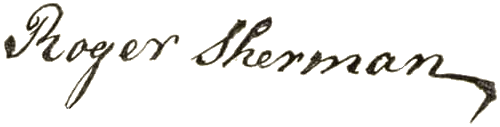
- Signature

Roger Sherman (April 19, 1721 – July 23, 1793) was an early American politician, lawyer, and a Founding Father of the United States. Representing Connecticut, he was the only person to sign all four great state papers of the United States: the Continental Association, the Declaration of Independence, the Articles of Confederation, and the Constitution. He also signed the 1774 Petition to the King.

Born in Newton, Massachusetts, Sherman established a legal career in Litchfield County, Connecticut, despite a lack of formal education. After a period in the Connecticut House of Representatives, he served as a justice of the Superior Court of Connecticut from 1766 to 1789. Connecticut sent him to the Continental Congress, and he was a member of the Committee of Five that drafted the Declaration of Independence.

Sherman served as a delegate to the 1787 Philadelphia Convention, which produced the United States Constitution. After Benjamin Franklin, he was the second oldest delegate present at the convention. Sherman favored granting the federal government power to raise revenue and regulate commerce, but initially opposed efforts to supplant the Articles of Confederation with a new constitution. After supporting the establishment of a new constitution, Sherman became a key delegate and main opponent of James Madison's Virginia Plan by introducing the Connecticut Compromise that won the approval of both the more and less populous states.

After the ratification of the Constitution, Sherman represented Connecticut in the United States House of Representatives from 1789 to 1791. He served in the United States Senate from 1791 to his death in 1793. Born in 1721, Sherman is the earliest born U.S. senator in history and was one of just three senators not to live until 1800.

== Early life and family ==
Sherman was born into a family of farmers in Newton, Massachusetts. His parents were William and Mehetabel Sherman. The Shermans left Newton and settled in what became the town of Stoughton, Massachusetts, 17 miles (27 km) southeast of his home in Newton, when Roger was two. Sherman's education did not extend beyond his father's library and grammar school, and his early career was spent as a shoemaker. However, he had an aptitude for learning, access to a good library owned by his father, and a Harvard-educated parish minister, Rev. Samuel Dunbar, who took him under his wing.

In 1743, his father's death led to Sherman moving with his mother and siblings to New Milford, Connecticut. There, in partnership with his brother William, he opened the town's first store, a cobbler shop. He earned a position as the county surveyor in 1745. The income from this office enabled him to buy land and to earn a favorable reputation throughout the county. Sherman published a series of almanacs between 1750 and 1761. He also studied law on his own, passing the bar in 1754.

He quickly introduced himself in civil and religious affairs, becoming one of the town's leading citizens and eventually town clerk of New Milford. He became county surveyor of New Haven County in 1745 and began providing astronomical calculations for almanacs in 1759.

Sherman was married two times and had a total of 15 children, with 12 reaching adulthood.

He first married Elizabeth Hartwell on November 17, 1749, and they had six children: John, William, Isaac, Chloe (1st), Chloe (2nd), Elizabeth. Elizabeth died in New Milford, Connecticut, on October 19, 1760.

Sherman then married Rebecca (also spelled Rebekah) Prescott (born on May 20, 1742, in Danvers, Massachusetts, second cousin of Samuel Prescott, who rode with Paul Revere) on May 12, 1763, and had nine children: Rebecca, Elizabeth, Roger, Mehetabel (1st), Mehetabel (2nd), Oliver, Abigail, Martha and Sarah. Rebecca died in New Haven, Connecticut on April 19, 1813.

Sherman was a 5th cousin three times removed of Union general William Tecumseh Sherman.

== Political career ==
=== Early political career ===
Despite the fact that Sherman had no formal legal training, he was urged to read for the bar exam by a local lawyer and was admitted to the bar of Litchfield, Connecticut, in 1754, during which he wrote "A Caveat Against Injustice" and was chosen to represent New Milford in the Connecticut House of Representatives from 1755 to 1758 and from 1760 to 1761. Sherman was appointed justice of the peace in 1762 and judge of the court of common pleas in 1765. During 1766, Sherman was first elected to the Governor's Council of the Connecticut General Assembly, where he served until 1785. From 1784 to 1785, he also served as a judge of the Connecticut Supreme Court of Errors. Sherman served as Justice of the Superior Court of Connecticut from 1766 to 1789.

Sherman was also appointed treasurer of Yale College, and awarded an honorary Master of Arts degree. He was a professor of religion for many years, and engaged in lengthy correspondences with some of the theologians of the time. During February 1776, Sherman, George Wythe, and John Adams were members of a committee responsible for establishing guidelines for U.S. Embassy officials in Canada with the committee instructions that included, "You are to declare that we hold sacred the rights of conscience, and may promise to the whole people, solemnly in our name, the free and undisturbed exercise of their religion. And ... that all civil rights and the rights to hold office were to be extended to persons of any Christian denomination." In 1784, Sherman was elected mayor of New Haven, which office he held until his death.

=== Continental and Confederation Congress ===
The Declaration of Independence by John Trumbull (1819) depicts the Committee of Five presenting its work to Congress. Sherman is second from the left.

As a member of the First Continental Congress, Sherman signed the Continental Association to impose an economic boycott on all British trade. In the Second Continental Congress, Sherman was appointed to the Committee of Five that drafted the Declaration of Independence. Sherman was also a member of the committee of 13 that was responsible for preparing a draft constitution for the new nation. During debate, Sherman proposed a bicameral national legislature where states would be represented equally. The committee of 13 rejected Sherman's proposal, adopting a unicameral legislature and what would become the Articles of Confederation. As a member of the Confederation Congress, Sherman was a signatory of the Treaty of Paris which ended the Revolutionary War.

=== Constitutional Convention ===
Sherman came into the Convention without the intention of creating a new constitution. He saw the convention as a means to modify the already existing government. Part of his stance was concerned with the public appeal. He defended amending the articles declaring that it was in the best interest of the people and the most probable way the people would accept changes to a constitution. "The problem with the old government was not that it had acted foolishly or threatened anybody's liberties, but that it had simply been unable to enforce its decrees." Sherman advanced the idea that the national government simply needed a way to raise revenue and regulate commerce.

Sherman's views were heavily shaped by Connecticut's position as a particularly isolationist state. Connecticut operated almost without much need from other states, using its own ports to trade with the West Indies instead of utilizing ports in Boston, and feared that "...the mass of people lacked sufficient wisdom to govern themselves and thus wished no branch of the federal government to be elected directly by the people".

His views were also influenced by his personal beliefs and Puritan views. Sherman opposed slavery and used the issue as a tool for negotiation and alliance. He believed that slavery was already gradually being abolished and the trend was moving southward. Sherman saw that the issue of slavery could be one that threatened the success of the Constitutional Convention. Therefore, Sherman helped shape compromises that benefited the slave states in order to obtain unlikely allies from the Carolinas due to the economies of their home states.

Sherman is also known for his stance against paper money with his authoring of Article I, Section 10 of the United States Constitution and his later opposition to James Madison over the Bill of Rights. He believed that these amendments would diminish the role and power of the states over the people.

Mr. Wilson & Mr. Sherman moved to insert after the words "coin money" the words "nor emit bills of credit, nor make any thing but gold & silver coin a tender in payment of debts" making these prohibitions absolute, instead of making the measures allowable (as in the XIII art) with the consent of the Legislature of the U.S. ... Mr. Sherman thought this a favorable crisis for crushing paper money. If the consent of the Legislature could authorize emissions of it, the friends of paper money would make every exertion to get into the Legislature in order to license it."

Sherman also had very little interest in creating an executive branch with much authority. He suggested that no constitutional provision needed be made for the executive because it was "nothing more than an institution for carrying the will of the Legislature into effect". Had Sherman's views prevailed, the United States would have become a parliamentary republic with an executive presidency, where the president is elected by the legislature and must maintain its confidence to remain in office.

Sherman also made the vice president an ex officio member of the Senate. They may break ties in the Senate, by having a casting vote, if the votes for passage and rejection are equally divided. Sherman predicted that otherwise the vice president "would be without employment."

==== Representation ====
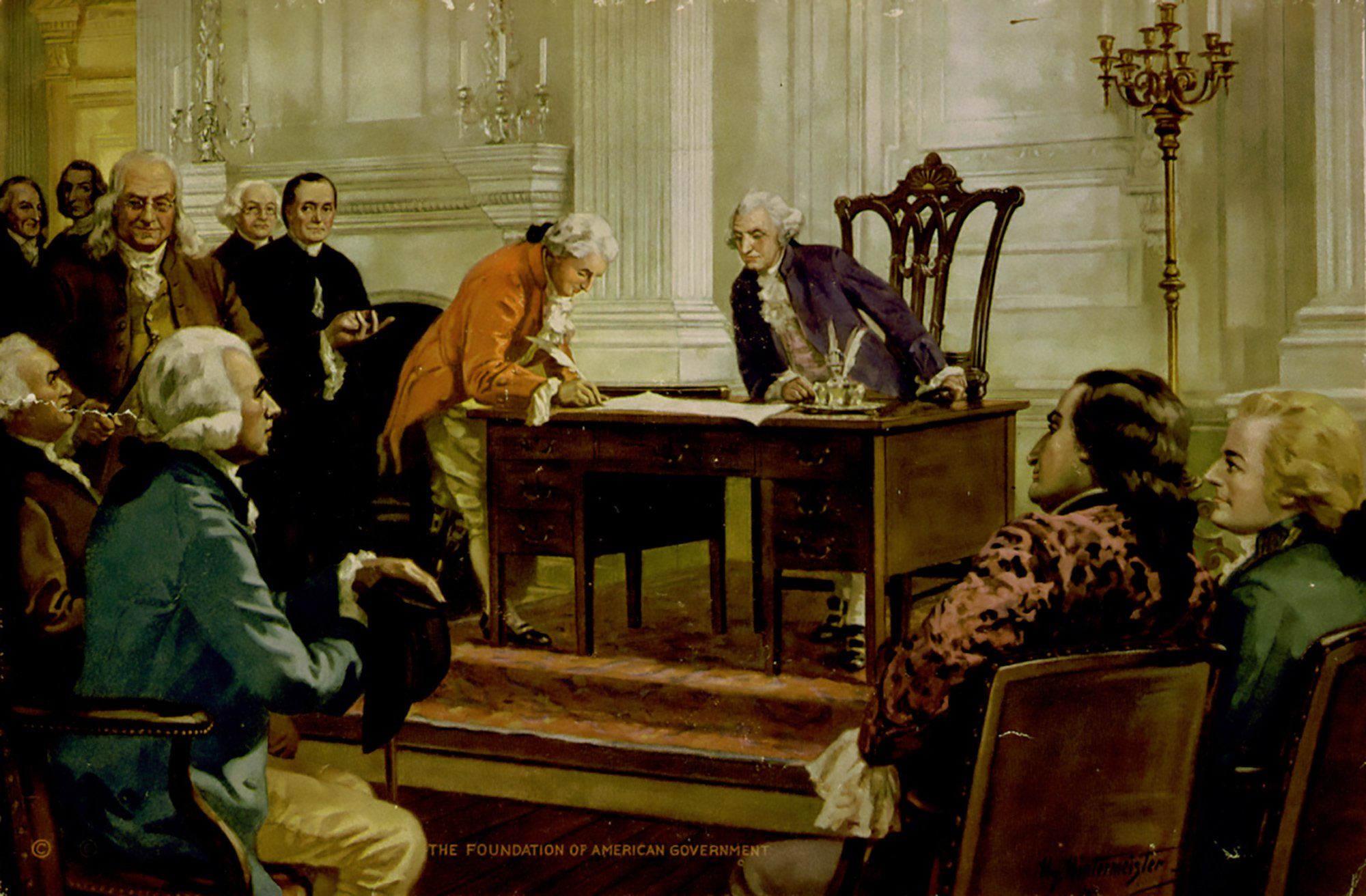
Foundation of the American Government. Roger Sherman is closest behind Morris, who is signing the Constitution. 1925 painting by John Henry Hintermeister.

Two proposed options for the formation of the legislative branch emerged in the deliberations. One was to form a bicameral legislature in which both chambers had representation proportional to the population of the states, which was supported by the Virginia Plan. The second was to modify the unicameral legislature that had equal representation from all of the states, which was supported by the New Jersey Plan introduced by William Paterson that Sherman helped author. Sherman saw no reason for bicameralism. He defended the unicameral legislature of the Articles of Confederation by stating that the more populous states had not "suffered at the hands of less populous states on account of the rule of equal voting". Sherman, Elbridge Gerry and others were of the shared opinion that the elected composition of the national government should be reserved for the vote of state officials and not for election by the will of the people. Sherman was wary of allowing ordinary citizen participation in national government and stated that the people "should have as little to do as may be about the Government. They want information and are constantly liable to be misled".

While Sherman was a devout supporter of a unicameral legislature, he recognized that this goal was unattainable because it would not receive the support of the more populous states. With the aid of Oliver Ellsworth, Sherman repeatedly proposed a bicameral compromise where one house had representation proportional to the population, and the other had equal representation for the states. Some scholars have identified Sherman as a pivotal delegate at the Convention because of his role in settling the debate over representation. At important moments in the deliberations, Sherman consistently pushed the interests of the less populous states. When delegates were unable to reconcile the differences between his plan and Madison's Virginia Plan, Sherman helped to get the issue of representation in Congress delegated to a Grand Committee of which he was not only a member but whose membership was sympathetic to the views of the less populous states.

The plan that emerged from the Grand Committee, originally introduced by Sherman, and which became known as the Connecticut Compromise, was designed to be acceptable to both the more and less populous states: the people would be represented proportionally in one branch of the legislature, called the House of Representatives (the lower legislative house). The states would be represented in another house called the Senate (the upper house). In the lower house, each state had a representative for every one delegate. In the upper house, each state was guaranteed two senators, regardless of its size. In terms of modes of election, Sherman supported allowing each state legislature to elect its own senators. In the House, Sherman originally proposed that the suffrage of the House should be figured according to the "numbers of free inhabitants" in each state.

=== Later career ===
Sherman was elected as a United States representative in the First Congress, and then to the Senate in the Second and Third Congresses until his death in 1793. In 1790 both Sherman and Richard Law were appointed to revise the confused and archaic Connecticut statutes, which they accomplished. Throughout his life, Sherman was a major benefactor of Yale College, acting as the university's treasurer for many years and promoting construction of a college chapel.

Sherman opposed appointment of fellow signer Gouverneur Morris as minister to France because he considered that high-living patriot to be of an "irreligious nature".

== Death and burial site ==
Sherman died in his sleep on July 23, 1793, after a two-month illness diagnosed as typhoid fever. The Gazette of the United States (Philadelphia), August 17, 1793, p. 508, reported an alternate diagnosis, "He was taken ill about the middle of May last, and from that time declined till his death. His physician supposed his disorder to be seated in his liver." He was buried in New Haven Green. In 1821, when that cemetery was relocated, his remains were moved to the Grove Street Cemetery.

Jonathan Edwards Jr. gave a funeral sermon at the ceremony for Sherman on July 25, 1793. He praised his contributions to his friends, family, town, and country, noting Sherman's piety and excellence in study.

== Legacy ==
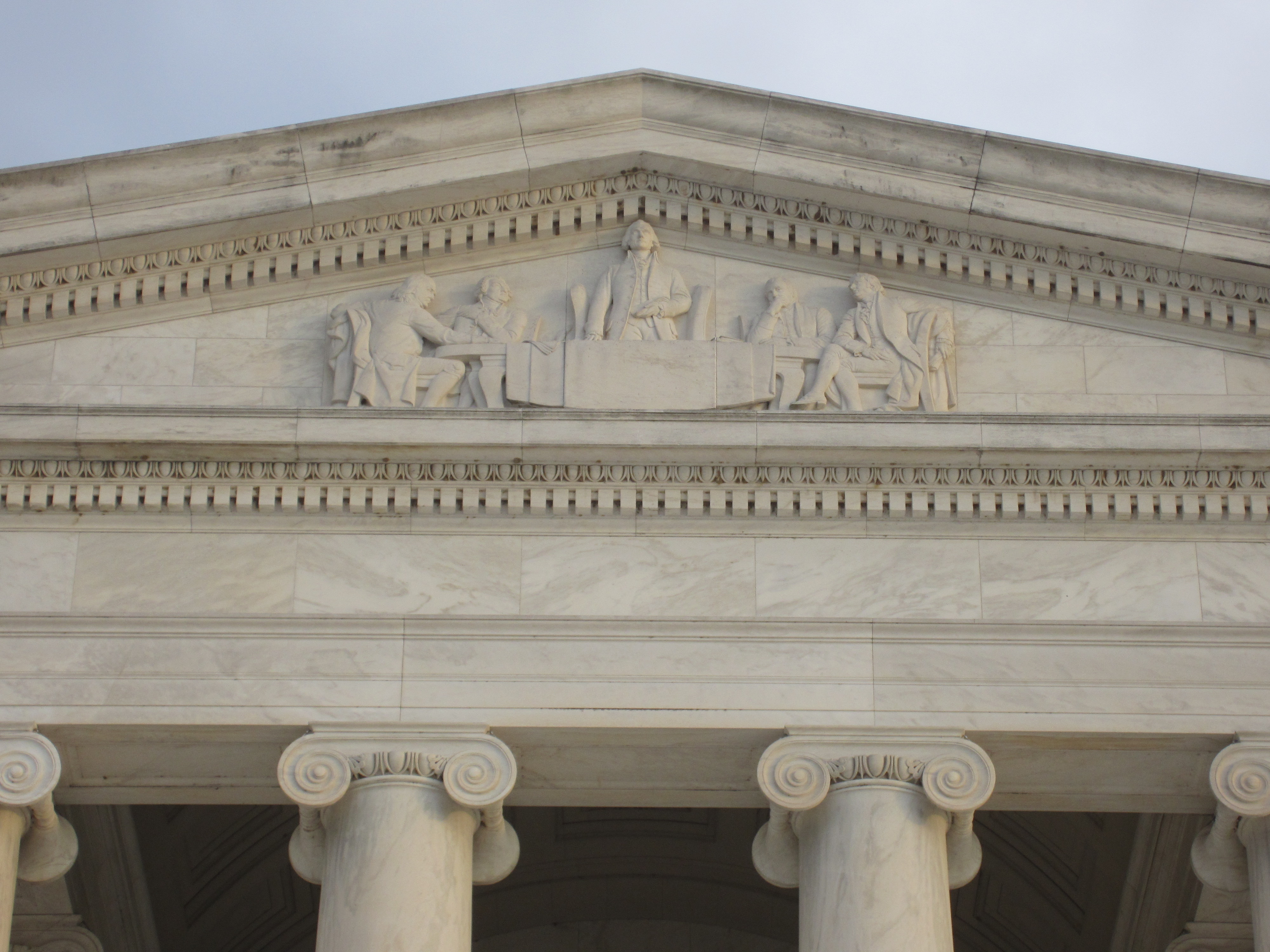
The Committee of Five, including Sherman, is depicted on the pediment of the Jefferson Memorial in a sculpture by Adolph Alexander Weinman.

Sherman is especially notable in United States history for being the only person to sign all four great state papers of the United States: the Articles of Association, the United States Declaration of Independence, the Articles of Confederation, and the United States Constitution. Robert Morris, who did not sign the Articles of Association, signed the other three. John Dickinson also signed three: the Continental Association, the Articles of Confederation, and the United States Constitution. He was involved with the Declaration of Independence but abstained, hoping for a reconciliation with Britain.

Sherman is one of the most influential members of the Constitutional Convention. He is not well known for his actions at the Convention because he was a "terse, ineloquent speaker" who never kept a personal record of his experience, unlike other prominent figures. At 66 years of age, Sherman was the second eldest member at the convention following Benjamin Franklin (who was 81 years old at the time). Yet he was a critical opponent of James Madison and the more populous states. Sherman was also one of the most active members of the convention; he made motions or seconds 160 times (compared to Madison's 177 times).

The town of Sherman, Connecticut, was named for Roger Sherman. As a member of the Committee of Five, Sherman is portrayed on the pediment of the Jefferson Memorial.

== See also ==
- List of members of the United States Congress who died in office (1790–1899)
- Memorial to the 56 Signers of the Declaration of Independence

Political offices
Preceded by None	Mayor of New Haven, Connecticut; 1784–1793	Succeeded by Samuel Bishop
U.S. Senate
Preceded by William S. Johnson	U.S. senator (Class 3) from Connecticut; 1791–1793; Served alongside: Oliver Ellsworth	Succeeded by Stephen M. Mitchell
U.S. House of Representatives
Preceded by District created	Member of the U.S. House of Representatives from Connecticut's at-large congressional district 1789–1791	Succeeded by Amasa Learned
Honorary titles
Preceded by William S. Johnson	Oldest living U.S. senator June 13, 1791 – July 23, 1793	Succeeded by William S. Johnson
