= The Hidden Universe =

- Dust-jacket from the first edition
- Author: Ralph Milne Farley
- Cover artist: Lora Crozetti
- Language: English
- Genre: Science fiction
- Publisher: Fantasy Publishing Company, Inc.
- Publication date: 1950
- Publication place: United States
- Media type: Print (hardback & paperback)
- Pages: 134
- OCLC: 4791210

The Hidden Universe is a collection of two science fiction novellas by American writer Ralph Milne Farley. It was first published in 1950 by Fantasy Publishing Company, Inc. in an edition of 700 copies of which 500 were hardback. The novellas originally appeared in the magazine Amazing Stories.

== Contents ==
- "The Hidden Universe"
- "We, the Mist"

== Sources ==
- Chalker, Jack L.; Mark Owings (1998). The Science-Fantasy Publishers: A Bibliographic History, 1923-1998. Westminster, MD and Baltimore: Mirage Press, Ltd. p. 271.
- Contento, William G. "Index to Science Fiction Anthologies and Collections". Archived from the original on 2008-12-11.
- Tuck, Donald H. (1974). The Encyclopedia of Science Fiction and Fantasy. Chicago: Advent. p. 224. ISBN 0-911682-20-1.

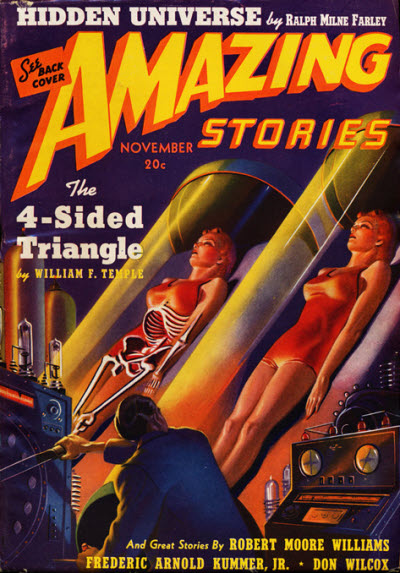
The title novella was serialized in Amazing Stories in 1939
