= New Jersey Plan =

1787 proposal for state representation in the US government

The New Jersey Plan (also known as the Small State Plan or the Paterson Plan) was a proposal for the structure of the United States government presented during the Constitutional Convention of 1787. Principally authored by William Paterson of New Jersey, the New Jersey Plan was an important alternative to the Virginia Plan proposed by James Madison and Edmund Randolph of Virginia.

The less populous states were strongly opposed to the bicameralism and proportional apportionment of Congress by population called for in the Virginia Plan. Less populous states were concerned that the Virginia Plan would give substantial control of the national government to the more populous states. In response, the less populous states proposed an alternative plan that would have retained the one-vote-per-state representation under one legislative body from the Articles of Confederation. Following the defeat of the New Jersey Plan, Paterson and Madison's proposals were reconciled through the Connecticut Compromise, which combined elements of each to create the current structure of Congress today—a Senate in which states are provided equal representation regardless of population, and a House of Representatives in which representatives are apportioned based on population.

== Proposal ==
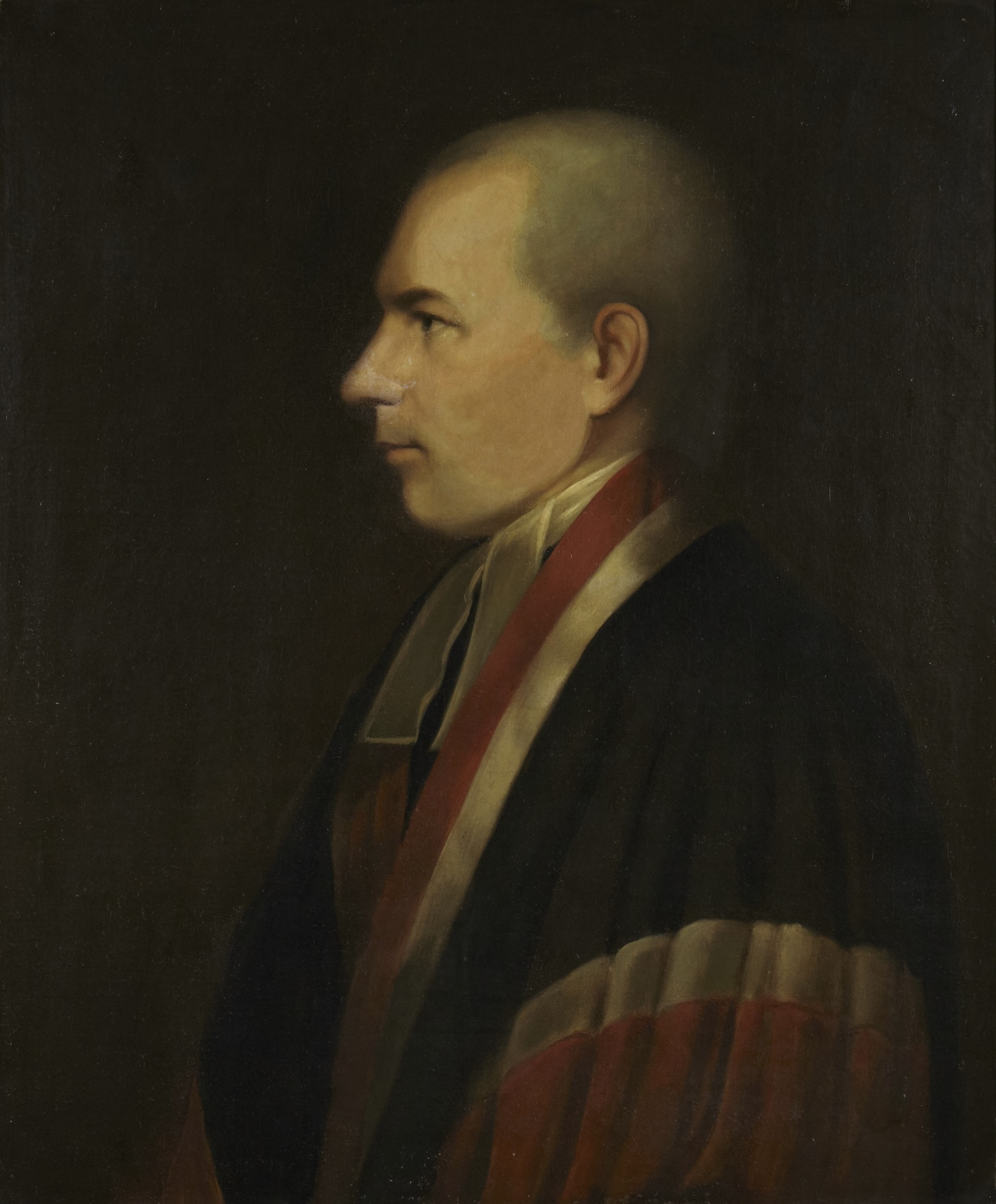
William Paterson, principal author of the New Jersey Plan

Edmund Randolph proposed the Virginia Plan, written by James Madison, on May 29, 1787. The Virginia Plan called for membership in two houses of the national legislature to be allocated to each state proportional to its population. A significant debate arose on proportional representation (Note: Not to be confused with proportional representation, an electoral system that typically elects multiple members of a party to a legislature based on that party's percentage of a popular vote.) following the introduction of the Virginia Plan. Many less populous states, such as Connecticut, Delaware, and New Jersey, feared that proportional representation would result in their interests being overshadowed by those of the larger states. Several of these states threatened to leave the Convention if proportional representation were adopted.

As small state delegates became increasingly alarmed at the debate taking place, William Paterson, with the assistance of Connecticut's Roger Sherman, Maryland's David Brearley and Luther Martin, and New York's John Lansing, proposed a unicameral legislature. Introduced on June 15, the New Jersey Plan would have maintained the Congress of the Confederation but substantially expanded its power.

The less populous states' alternative plan provided that each state was to have equal representation in the legislature, regardless of their population. This position reflected the belief that the states were independent entities and, as they entered the United States freely and individually, remained so.

The New Jersey Plan proposed:

1. The Articles of Confederation should be amended.
2. In addition to the existing powers under all of the Articles of Confederation, Congress gained authority to raise funds via tariffs and other measures, and to regulate interstate commerce and commerce with other nations. Cases involving these powers would still be heard by state courts unless appealed to the federal judiciary.
3. Congress has the authority to collect taxes from states based on the number of free inhabitants and 3/5ths of slaves in that state. However, this power requires the consent of some proportion of the states.
4. Congress elects a federal executive, consisting of multiple people, who cannot be re-elected and can be recalled by Congress when requested by the majority of executives of the states.
5. The federal judiciary is represented by a Supreme Tribunal, appointed by the federal executive, which has authority in federal impeachment cases and as the appeal of last resort in cases dealing with national matters (such as treaties).
6. The Articles of Confederation and treaties are the supreme law of the land, an early representation in the debates of the Supremacy Clause. The federal executive is authorized to use force to compel non-compliant states to observe the law.
7. A policy of admission of new states should be established.
8. A singular policy for naturalization should be established.
9. A citizen of one state can be prosecuted under the laws of another state in which the crime was committed.

Variations also proposed that state governments must be bound by oath to support the Articles, that a policy should be established to handle territorial disputes, and that the offenses deemed treason should be defined.

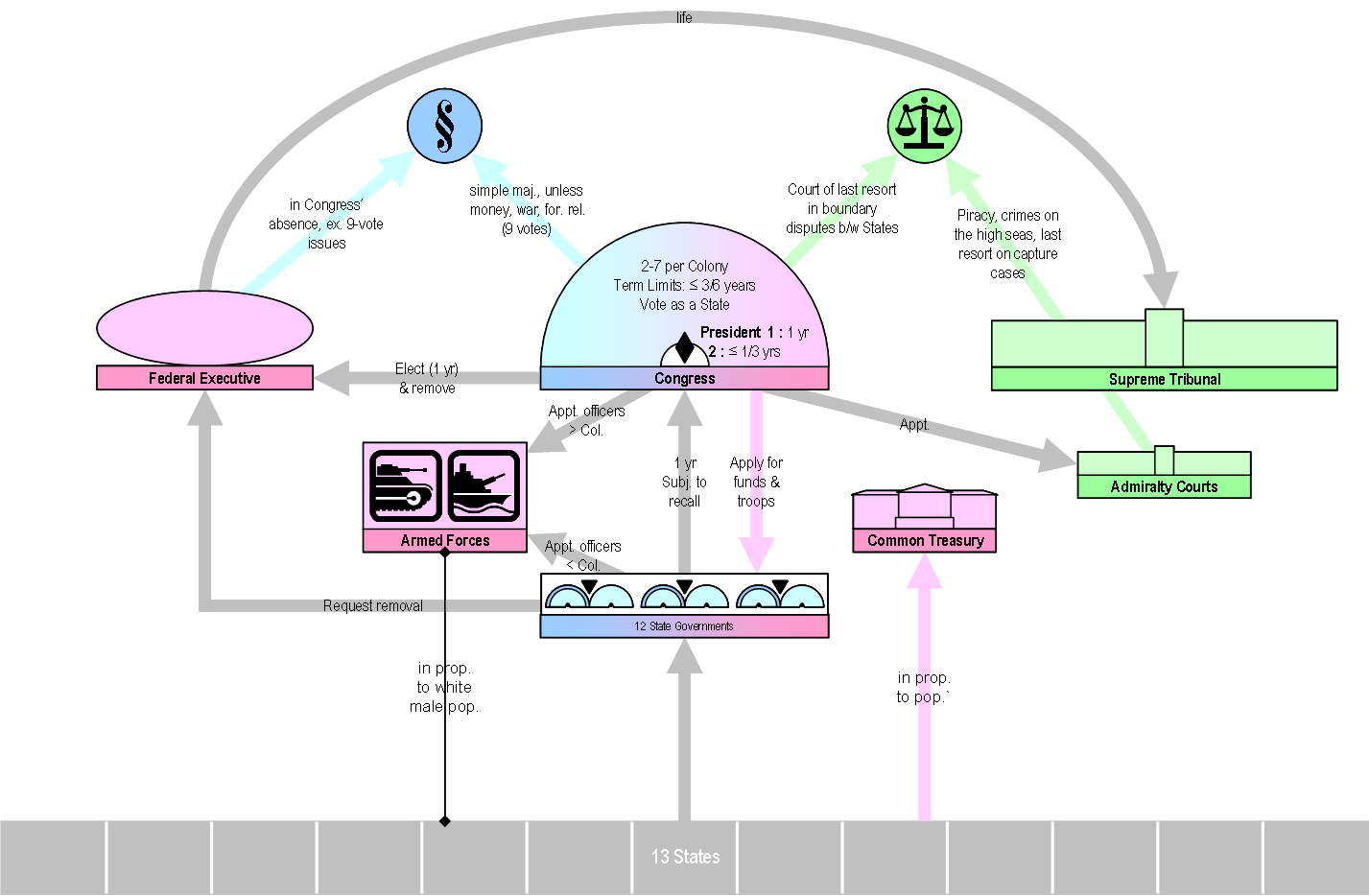
The New Jersey Plan

== Debate ==
After the introduction of the New Jersey Plan, debate over the plan lasted for four days. Even though the New Jersey Plan significantly expanded Congress's power, the proposed increases were not sufficient to gain support from any of the more populous states. During debate over the New Jersey Plan, Alexander Hamilton on June 18 presented his own plan to replace the Articles of Confederation. Different from both the Virginia and New Jersey Plans, Hamilton proposed a constitution modeled on that of the United Kingdom. With little debate on Hamilton's proposal, attention returned to the New Jersey Plan. Delegates from the more populous states heavily criticized the plan and delegates from the less populous states failed to fully defend it.

Ultimately, on June 19 delegates rejected the New Jersey Plan. Three states voted in favor, seven against, and one divided. Even delegates that helped Paterson author the New Jersey Plan voted against it, including Connecticut's Roger Sherman and Oliver Ellsworth. Since several delegates from less populous states failed to strongly defend the proposal during debate or vote in support of it on June 19, some scholars have suggested that the New Jersey Plan was proposed strategically by the less populous states to help secure a compromise on representation by showing that the Virginia Plan's proportional representation would never be accepted by the less populous states.

Following the New Jersey Plan's defeat, delegates continued to debate representation and the less populous states' concerns. Delegates from the less populous states proposed combining elements of the Virginia Plan and New Jersey Plan to create a compromise on representation that favored the less populous states. The Connecticut Compromise, introduced by Roger Sherman and Oliver Ellsworth, suggested a bicameral legislature with the House of Representatives apportioned by population, as desired by the Virginia Plan, and the Senate apportioned equally by state, as desired by the New Jersey Plan. The Connecticut Compromise was approved by delegates on July 16.

== See also ==
- History of the United States Constitution
- Timeline of drafting and ratification of the United States Constitution
