= Connecticut Compromise =

Agreement which established the structure of the United States federal legislature

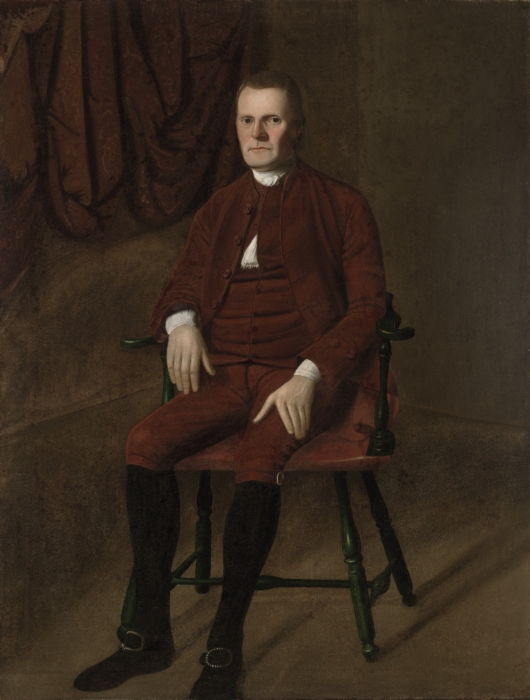
A portrait of Roger Sherman, who authored the agreement

The Connecticut Compromise, also known as the Great Compromise of 1787 or Sherman Compromise, was an agreement reached during the Constitutional Convention of 1787 that in part defined the legislative structure and representation each state would have under the United States Constitution. It retained the bicameral legislature as proposed by Roger Sherman, along with proportional representation (Note: Not to be confused with proportional representation, an electoral system that typically elects multiple members of a party to a legislature based on that party's percentage of a popular vote.) of the states in the lower house or House of Representatives, and it required the upper house or Senate to be weighted equally among the states; each state would have two members in the Senate.

== Background ==
On May 29, 1787, Edmund Randolph of the Virginia delegation proposed the creation of a bicameral legislature. Under his proposal, known as the Virginia or Randolph Plan, membership in both houses would be allocated to each state proportional to its population. Candidates for the lower house would be nominated and elected by the people of each state, while candidates for the upper house would be nominated by the state legislatures and then elected by the members of the lower house.

Less populous states like Delaware were afraid that such an arrangement would result in their voices and interests being drowned out by the larger states. Many delegates also felt that the Convention did not have the authority to completely scrap the Articles of Confederation, as the Virginia Plan would have done. In response, on June 15, 1787, William Paterson of the New Jersey delegation proposed a legislature consisting of a single house. Each state was to have equal representation in this body, regardless of population. The New Jersey Plan, as it was called, would have left the Articles of Confederation in place but would have amended them to somewhat increase Congress's powers.

At the time of the convention, the South was growing more quickly than the North, and southern states had the most extensive Western claims. South Carolina, North Carolina, and Georgia were small in the 1780s, but they expected growth and thus favored proportional representation. New York was one of the largest states at the time, but two of its three representatives (Alexander Hamilton being the exception) supported an equal representation per state, as part of their desire to see maximum autonomy for the states.

James Madison and Hamilton were two of the leaders of the proportional representation group. Madison argued that a conspiracy of large states against the small states was unrealistic as the large states were so different from each other. Hamilton argued that the states were artificial entities made up of individuals and accused small state representatives of wanting power, not liberty. For their part, the small state representatives argued that the states were, in fact, of a legally equal status and that proportional representation would be unfair to their states. Gunning Bedford Jr. of Delaware notoriously threatened on behalf of the small states, "the small ones w[ould] find some foreign ally of more honor and good faith, who will take them by the hand and do them justice". Elbridge Gerry ridiculed the small states' claim of sovereignty, saying "that we never were independent States, were not such now, & never could be even on the principles of the Confederation. The States & the advocates for them were intoxicated with the idea of their sovereignty."

On June 19, 1787, the delegates rejected the New Jersey Plan and voted to proceed with discussion of the Virginia Plan. The smaller states grew increasingly discontented, with some threatening to withdraw. On July 2, 1787, the Convention reached a deadlock over the proposal to grant each state an equal vote in the upper house, resulting in five states in favor, five opposed, and one divided.

== Compromise ==
The problem was referred to a committee consisting of one delegate from each state to reach a compromise. On July 5, 1787, the committee submitted its report, which became the basis for the "Great Compromise" of the Convention. The report recommended that in the upper house each state should have an equal vote, and in the lower house, each state should have one representative for every 40,000 inhabitants, counting three-fifths of each state's enslaved population toward that state's total population, and that money bills should originate in the lower house (not subject to amendment by the upper chamber).

Sherman sided with the two-house national legislature of the Virginia Plan, but proposed "That the proportion of suffrage in the 1st. Branch [house] should be according to the respective numbers of free inhabitants; and that in the second branch or Senate, each State should have one vote and no more." What was ultimately included in the constitution was a modified form of this plan, partly because the larger states disliked it. In committee, Benjamin Franklin modified Sherman's proposal to make it more acceptable to the larger states. He added the requirement that revenue bills originate in the House.

James Madison of Virginia, Rufus King of Massachusetts, and Gouverneur Morris of Pennsylvania each vigorously opposed the compromise since it left the Senate looking like the Confederation Congress. For the nationalists, the Convention's vote for the compromise was a setback. However, on July 23, they found a way to continue with their vision of an elite, independent Senate. Just before most of the convention's work was referred to the Committee of Detail, Morris and King moved that states' members in the Senate be given individual votes, rather than voting en bloc, as they had in the Confederation Congress. Then Oliver Ellsworth, a leading proponent of the Connecticut Compromise, supported their motion, and the Convention reached the enduring compromise.

After six weeks of turmoil, on July 16, 1787, North Carolina switched its vote to equal representation per state, Massachusetts' delegation was divided, and a compromise was reached on a 5–4 vote of the states. Every state was given equal representation, previously known as the New Jersey Plan, in one house of Congress, and proportional representation, known before as the Virginia Plan, in the other. Because it was considered more responsive to majority sentiment, the House of Representatives was given the power to originate all legislation dealing with the federal budget and revenues/taxation, per the Origination Clause.

Since the Convention had earlier accepted the Virginia Plan's proposal that senators have long terms, restoring that plan's vision of individually powerful senators stopped the Senate from becoming a strong safeguard of federalism. State governments lost their direct say in Congress's decisions to make national laws. As the personally influential senators received terms much longer than the state legislators who elected them, they became substantially independent. The compromise continued to serve the self-interests of small-state political leaders, who were assured of access to more seats in the Senate than they might otherwise have obtained.

== Constitution ==
Senate representation was explicitly protected in Article Five of the United States Constitution:

[N]o State, without its Consent, shall be deprived of its equal Suffrage in the Senate.

This agreement allowed deliberations to continue and thus led to the Three-fifths Compromise, which further complicated the issue of popular representation in the House.

== See also ==
- History of the United States Constitution
- European Parliament and Council of the European Union, the two legislative chambers of the European Union, which follow the structural principles of the Connecticut Compromise.

== Additional research ==
- Ballingrud, Gordon; Dougherty, Keith L. (October 2018). "Coalitional Instability and the Three-Fifths Compromise". American Journal of Political Science. 62 (4): 12. doi:10.1111/ajps.12378. JSTOR 26598788.
- Claus, Laurence (Fall 2019). "The Framers' Compromise". The American Journal of Comparative Law. 67 (3): 677–684. doi:10.1093/ajcl/avz022. JSTOR 26866524.
- Earle, Jonathan (April 2011). "The Political Origins of the Civil War". OAH Magazine of History. 25 (2): 8–13. doi:10.1093/oahmag/oar006. JSTOR 23210239.
- Estes, Todd (Summer 2011). "The Connecticut Effect: The Great Compromise of 1787 and the History of Small State Impact on Electoral College Outcomes". The Historian. 73 (2): 255–283. doi:10.1111/j.1540-6563.2011.00291.x. JSTOR 24455090.
- Farrand, Max (April 1904). "Compromises of the Constitution". The American Historical Review. 9 (3): 479–489. doi:10.2307/1833471. JSTOR 1833471.
- Finkelman, Paul (1996). Slavery and the Founders: Race and Liberty in the Age of Jefferson. Armonk, NY: M.E. Sharpe. pp. 3–32. ISBN 9781563245909.
- Lynd, Staughton (June 1966). "The Compromise of 1787". Political Science Quarterly. 81 (2). Oxford University Press: 225–250. doi:10.2307/2147971. JSTOR 2147971.
- —— (1965), "The Abolitionist Critique of the United States Constitution", in Duberman, Martin B. (ed.), New Essays on the Abolitionists, Princeton, NJ: Princeton University Press, pp. 209–239
- Nelson, William E. (July 1987). "Reason and Compromise in the Establishment of the Federal Constitution, 1787-1801". The William and Mary Quarterly. 44 (3): 458–484. doi:10.2307/1939766. JSTOR 1939766.
- Ohline, Howard A. (October 1971). "Republicanism and Slavery: Origins of the Three-Fifths Clause in the United States Constitution". The William and Mary Quarterly. 28 (4): 563–584. doi:10.2307/1922187. JSTOR 1922187.
- Pope, Jeremy C.; Treier, Shawn (April 2011). "Reconsidering the Great Compromise at the Federal Convention of 1787: Deliberation and Agenda Effects on the Senate and Slavery". American Journal of Political Science. 55 (3): 18. doi:10.1111/j.1540-5907.2010.00490.x. JSTOR 23025052.
- Rakove, Jack N. (July 1987). "The Great Compromise: Ideas, Interests, and the Politics of Constitution Making". The William and Mary Quarterly. 44 (3): 424–457. doi:10.2307/1939765. JSTOR 1939765.
- Wills, Garry (2003). Negro President: Jefferson and the Slave Power. Boston: Houghton Mifflin. pp. 1–13. ISBN 978-0618-34398-0.
