= Virginia Plan =

Planned structure of the U.S. Constitution

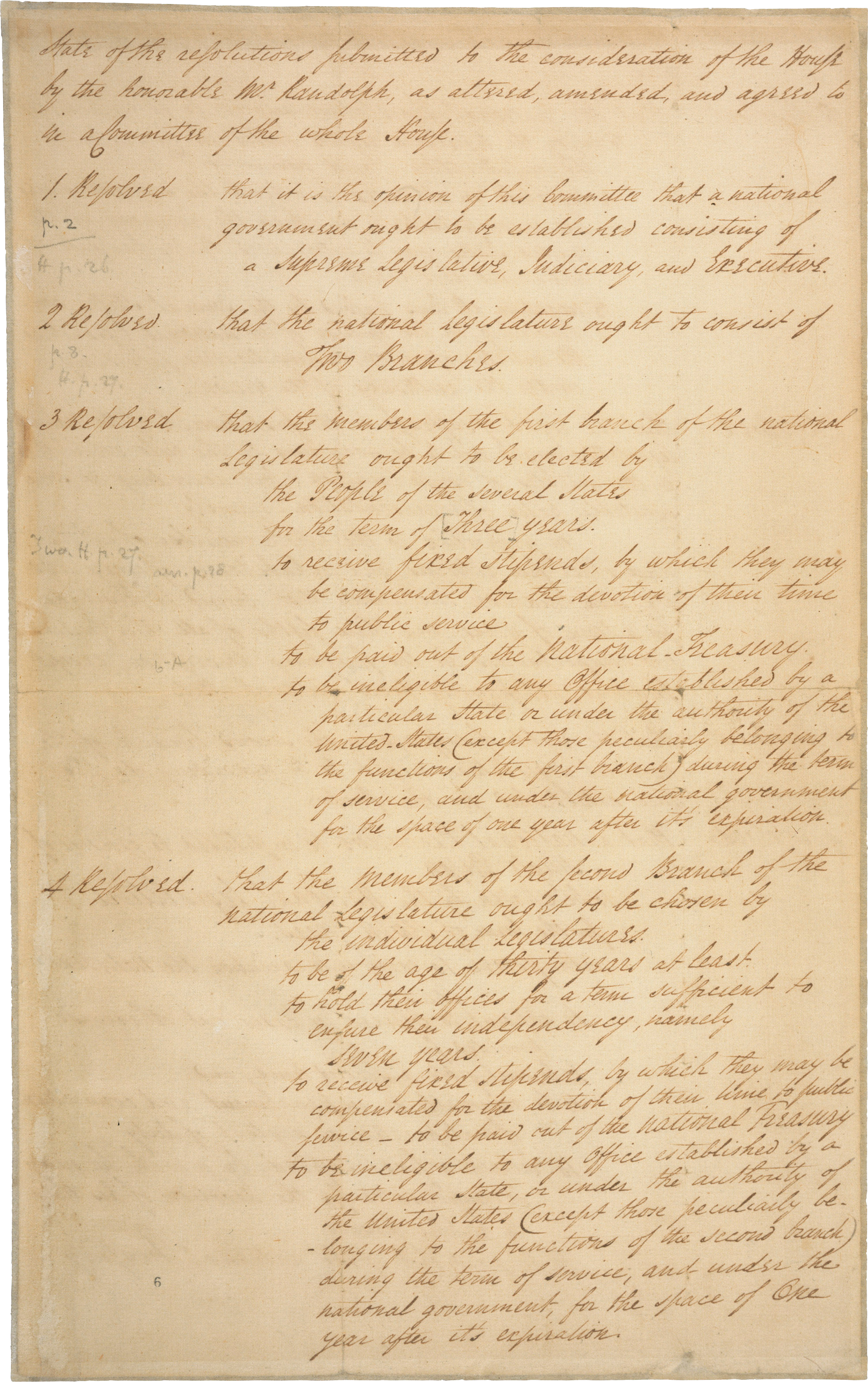
- Front side of the Virginia Plan 1787
- Created: May 29, 1787
- Location: National Archives
- Author: James Madison
- Purpose: Propose a structure of government to the Philadelphia Convention

Full text
- Virginia Plan at Wikisource

The Virginia Plan (also known as the Randolph Plan or the Large-State Plan) was a proposed plan of government for the United States presented at the Constitutional Convention of 1787. The plan called for the creation of a supreme national government with three branches and a bicameral legislature. The plan was drafted by James Madison and Edmund Randolph.

The Virginia Plan was notable for its role in setting the overall agenda for debate in the Convention and, in particular, for setting forth the idea of population-weighted representation in the proposed national legislature. The Virginia Plan favored the interests of states with large populations, and the New Jersey Plan was proposed in response to protect small state interests.

== Drafting and proposal ==
From May 25 to September 17, 1787, the Constitutional Convention gathered in Philadelphia to revise the Articles of Confederation, the first plan of government of the United States. The Articles were widely criticized for creating a weak central government—the Confederation Congress—that was powerless to solve the nation's problems. Under the Articles, Congress was unable to raise taxes to pay for a military or pay off foreign debts. It also lacked the authority to control foreign and interstate commerce. The Articles had no provision for executive and judicial branches, which meant the Confederation government lacked effective means to enforce its own laws and treaties against non-compliant states.

James Madison, a delegate from Virginia, believed that the solution to America's problems was to be found in a strong central government. Congress needed compulsory taxation authority as well as power to regulate foreign and interstate commerce. To prevent state interference with the national government's authority, Madison believed there needed to be a way to enforce the national supremacy, such as an explicit right of Congress to use force against non-compliant states and the creation of a national court system. Madison also believed that to be a truly national government, Congress would need to exercise authority over citizens directly—not simply through the states. This would require a change in how states were represented in Congress; under the Articles each state received one vote. Madison believed representation ought to be apportioned by population, with more populous states having more votes than less populous states.

Madison was also concerned with preventing a tyranny of the majority. The government needed to be neutral between the various factions or interest groups that divided society—creditors and debtors, rich and poor, or farmers, merchants and manufacturers. Madison believed that a single faction could more easily control the government within a state but would have a more difficult time dominating a national government comprising many different interest groups. To protect both national authority and minority rights, Madison believed Congress should be granted veto power over state laws.

While waiting for the convention to formally begin, Madison sketched out the Virginia Plan in consultation with members of the Virginia and Pennsylvania delegations, particularly Virginia's governor, Edmund Randolph, who largely shared his vision of a strong national government. While Madison is often given chief credit for producing the plan, it was Randolph who contributed substantial elements of it and then officially put it before the Convention on May 29, 1787. In his introduction, Randolph highlighted the problems facing the Confederation. Referring to Shays' Rebellion in Massachusetts, he warned of "anarchy from the laxity of government". The solution to these problems, he asserted, must be based on "the republican principle".

== Resolutions ==
Calling for the creation of a supreme national government, the Virginia Plan was a radical departure from the Articles of Confederation. Modeled on the existing state governments, the plan called for three branches of government (executive, legislative and judicial). Since the legislature appointed both the executive and judicial branches, however, the plan lacked the system of checks and balances that became central to the US Constitution. It was presented to the convention as fifteen draft resolutions that outlined basic principles of government.

1. The Articles of Confederation needed to be "corrected and enlarged" to achieve their original purpose, which was to provide for the "common defense, security of liberty, and general welfare". While presented as a revision of the Articles, the Virginia Plan was in reality a replacement of the Articles.
2. Representation in the national legislature should be apportioned according either to "quotas of contribution" (a state's wealth as reflected in the taxes it paid) or the size of each state's non-slave population. This would provide large states, like Virginia, more representation than they had under the Articles of Confederation, which gave each state equal representation regardless of population. For this reason, the plan was called the "large-state plan".
3. The unicameral Confederation Congress should be replaced with a bicameral legislature.
4. Unlike members of the Confederation Congress who were elected by and responsible to the state legislatures, the members of the first branch of the legislature (what would become the House of Representatives) would be elected by the people. Members of the first branch would be subject to rotation in office and recall elections.
5. The first branch of the legislature would select the members of the second branch (what would become the Senate) from candidates nominated by state legislatures.
6. The national legislature would have all the legislative power belonging to the Confederation Congress in addition to new powers. These new powers include "to legislate in all cases to which the separate states are incompetent" and the ability to veto any state law that was contrary to the articles of union.
7. The national legislature would choose a national executive to serve a single term. The executive would have a "general authority to execute the national laws" as well as the executive powers granted to the Confederation Congress, including the power to make war and treaties.
8. The executive together with a "convenient number" of judges would form a council of revision with the power to veto any act of the national or state legislatures. This veto could be overridden by an unspecified number of votes of the national legislature.
9. The national judiciary would include a supreme tribunal and inferior tribunals chosen by the national legislature. Judges would hold office during good behavior. The judicial branch would have jurisdiction over piracy, felonies on the high seas, enemy captures, cases involving foreigners or citizens of multiple states, cases involving collection of national revenue, questions involving "national peace and harmony", and impeachment of national officials.
10. There should be procedures for the admission of new states into the Union.
11. The United States will guarantee a republican government to each state.
12. "[P]rovision ought to be made for the continuance of Congress and their authorities and privileges, until a given day after the reform of the articles of Union shall be adopted, and for the completion of all their engagements."
13. A process for amending the constitution will be provided that does not require the assent of the national legislature.
14. State officers would take an oath to support the constitution.
15. The proposals of the Constitutional Convention would be ratified by assemblies elected by the people.

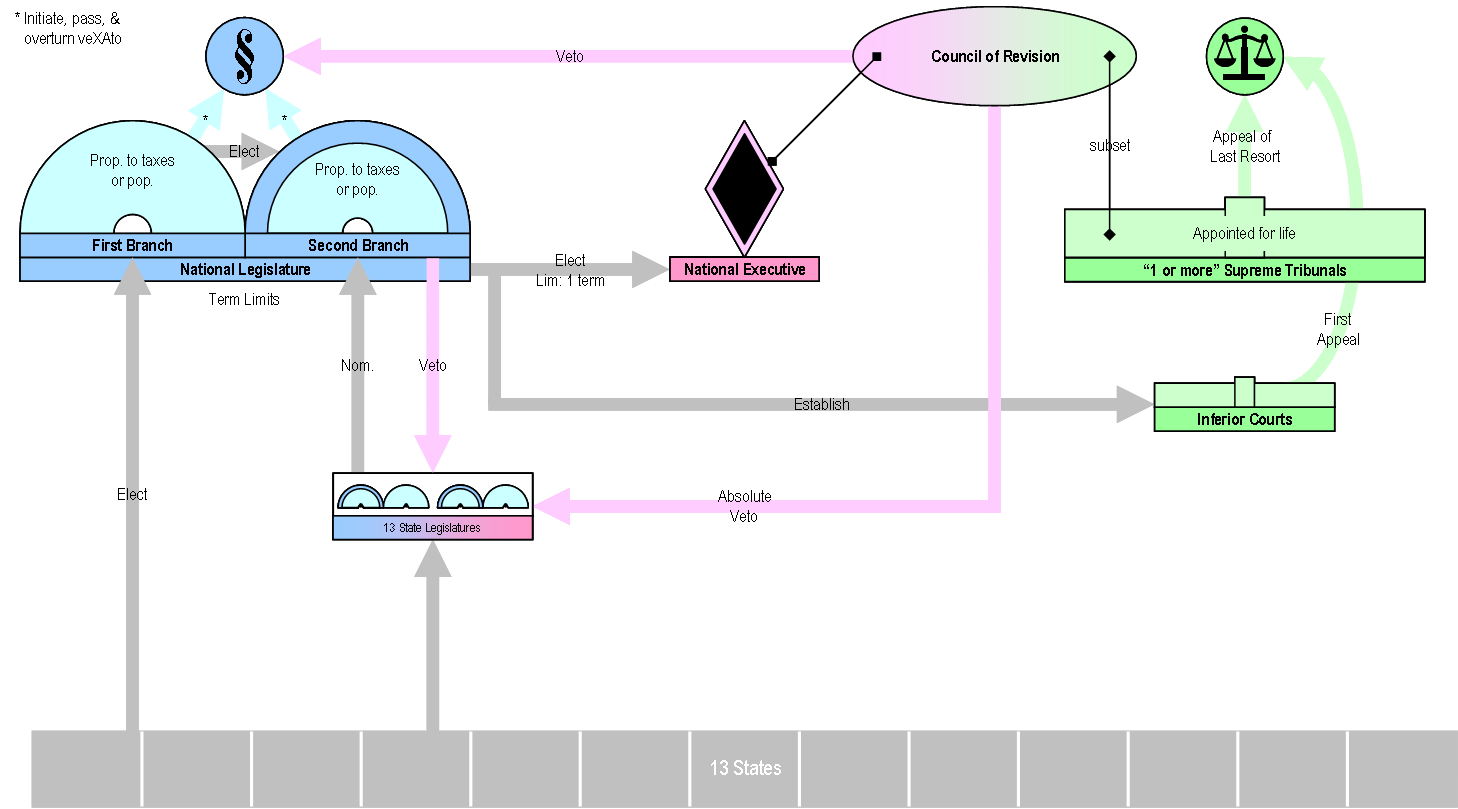
The Virginia Plan

== Reaction ==
Large states supported this plan, and smaller states generally opposed it, preferring alternatives that guaranteed each state equal representation regardless of population. On June 15, 1787, the smaller states presented the New Jersey Plan, which proposed a single-chamber legislature where each state, regardless of population, would have one vote, as under the Articles of Confederation. In July, after the meeting of the First Committee of Eleven, the Convention settled on the Connecticut Compromise, creating a House of Representatives apportioned by population and a Senate in which each state is equally represented.

== Popular culture ==
The Virginia Plan and the debate surrounding it are prominently featured in the 1989 film A More Perfect Union, which depicts the events of the 1787 Constitutional Convention. Presented largely from the viewpoint and words of James Madison, the movie was mainly filmed in Independence Hall.
