= History of the United States Constitution =

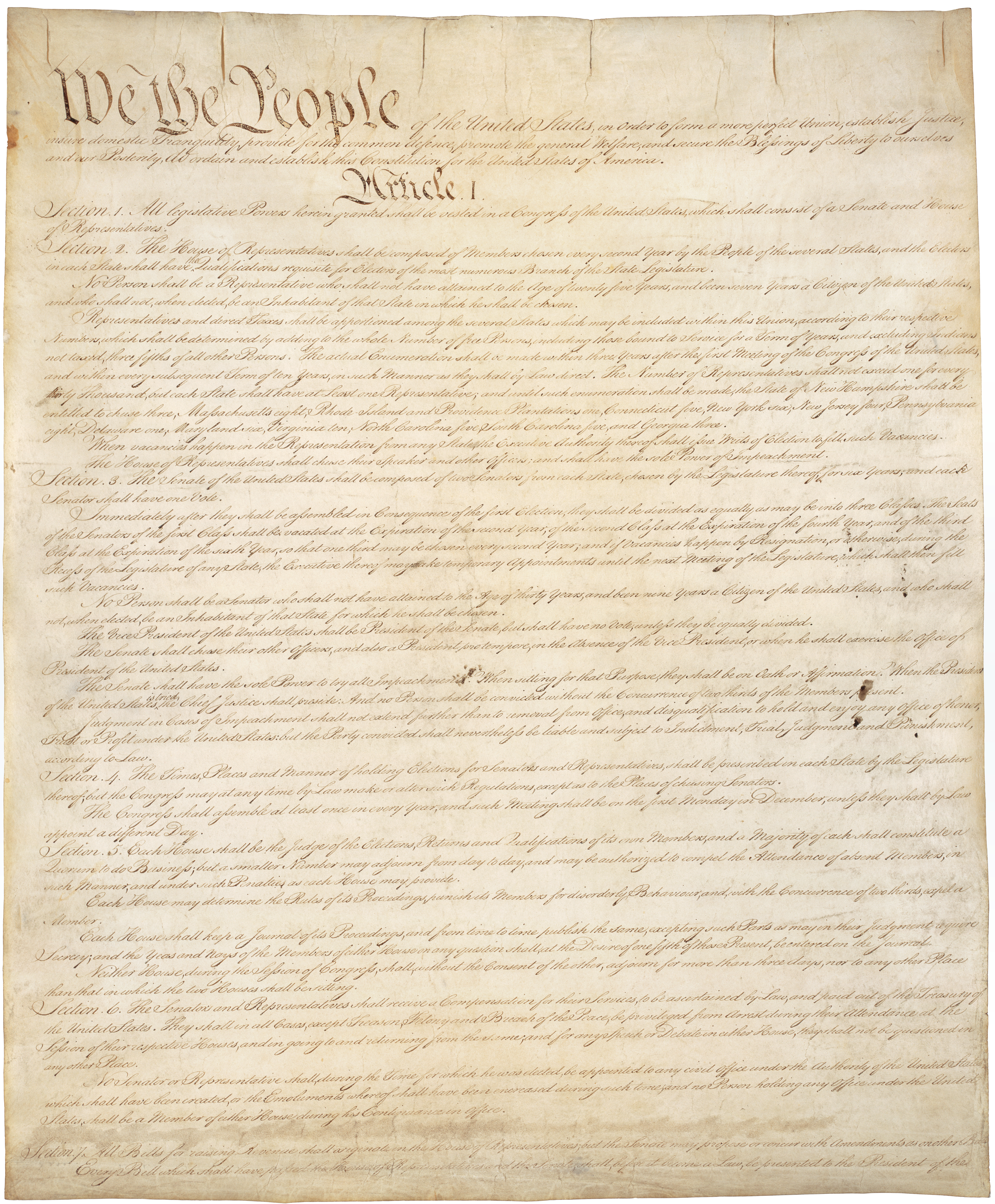
Page one of the original copy of the United States Constitution, engrossed by Jacob Shallus

The United States Constitution has served as the supreme law of the United States since taking effect in 1789. The document was written at the 1787 Philadelphia Convention and was ratified through a series of state conventions held in 1787 and 1788. Since 1789, the Constitution has been amended twenty-seven times; particularly important amendments include the ten amendments of the United States Bill of Rights, the three Reconstruction Amendments, and the Nineteenth Amendment.

The Constitution grew out of efforts to reform the Articles of Confederation, an earlier constitution which provided for a loose alliance of states with a weak central government. From May 1787 through September 1787, delegates from twelve of the thirteen states convened in Philadelphia, where they wrote a new constitution. Two alternative plans were developed at the convention. The nationalist majority, soon to be called "Federalists", put forth the Virginia Plan, a consolidated government based on proportional representation (Note: Not to be confused with proportional representation, an electoral system that typically elects multiple members of a party to a legislature based on that party's percentage of a popular vote.) among the states by population. The "old patriots", later called "Anti-Federalists", advocated the New Jersey Plan, a purely federal proposal, based on providing each state with equal representation. The Connecticut Compromise allowed for both plans to work together. Other controversies developed regarding slavery and a Bill of Rights in the original document.

The drafted Constitution was submitted to the Congress of the Confederation in September 1787; that same month it approved the forwarding of the Constitution as drafted to the states, each of which would hold a ratification convention. The Federalist Papers, were published in newspapers while the states were debating ratification, which provided background and justification for the Constitution. Some states agreed to ratify the Constitution only if the amendments that were to become the Bill of Rights would be taken up immediately by the new government. In September 1788, the Congress of the Confederation certified that eleven states had ratified the new Constitution, and chose dates for federal elections and the transition to the new constitution on March 4, 1789. The new government began on March 4, 1789, with eleven states assembled in New York City. North Carolina waited to ratify the Constitution until after the Bill of Rights was passed by the new Congress, and Rhode Island's ratification would only come after a threatened trade embargo.

In 1791, the states ratified the Bill of Rights, which established protections for various civil liberties. The Bill of Rights initially only applied to the federal government, but following a process of incorporation most protections of the Bill of Rights now apply to state governments. Further amendments to the Constitution have addressed federal relationships, election procedures, terms of office, expanding the electorate, financing the federal government, consumption of alcohol, and congressional pay. Between 1865 and 1870, the states ratified the Reconstruction Amendments, which abolished slavery, guaranteed equal protection of the law, and implemented prohibitions on the restriction of voter rights. The meaning of the Constitution is interpreted by judicial review in the federal courts. The original parchment copies are on display at the National Archives Building.

== Revolution and early governance ==
=== Declaration of Independence ===
On June 4, 1776, a resolution was introduced in the Second Continental Congress declaring the union with Great Britain to be dissolved, proposing the formation of foreign alliances, and suggesting the drafting of a plan of confederation to be submitted to the respective states. Independence was declared on July 4, 1776; the preparation of a plan of confederation was postponed. Although the Declaration was a statement of principles, it did not create a government or even a framework for how politics would be carried out. It was the Articles of Confederation that provided the necessary structure to the new nation during and after the American Revolution. The Declaration, however, did set forth the ideas of natural rights and the social contract that would help form the foundation of constitutional government.

The era of the Declaration of Independence is sometimes called the "Continental Congress" period. John Adams famously estimated as many as one-third of those resident in the original thirteen colonies were patriots. Scholars such as Gordon Wood describe how Americans were caught up in the Revolutionary fervor and excitement of creating governments, societies, a new nation on the face of the earth by rational choice as Thomas Paine declared in his January 1776 pamphlet Common Sense.

Republican government and personal liberty for "the people" were to overspread the New World continents and to last forever, a gift to posterity. These goals were influenced by Enlightenment philosophy. The adherents to this cause seized on English Whig political philosophy as described by historian Forrest McDonald as justification for most of their changes to received colonial charters and traditions. It was rooted in opposition to monarchy they saw as venal and corrupting to the "permanent interests of the people."

To these partisans, voting was the only permanent defense of the people. Elected terms for legislature were cut to one year, for Virginia's Governor, one year without re-election. Property requirements for suffrage for men were reduced to taxes on their tools in some states. Free blacks in New York could vote if they owned enough property. New Hampshire was thinking of abolishing all voting requirements for men except residency and religion. New Jersey let women vote. In some states, senators were now elected by the same voters as the larger electorate for the House, and even judges were elected to one-year terms.

These "radical Whigs" were called the people "out-of-doors." They distrusted not only royal authority, but any small, secretive group as being unrepublican. Crowds of men and women massed at the steps of rural Court Houses during market-militia-court days. Shays' Rebellion (1786–87) is a famous example. Urban riots began by the out-of-doors rallies on the steps of an oppressive government official with speakers such as members of the Sons of Liberty holding forth in the "people's "committees" until some action was decided upon, including hanging his effigy outside a bedroom window, or looting and burning down the offending tyrant's home.

=== First and Second Continental Congresses ===
The First Continental Congress met from September 5 to October 26, 1774. It agreed that the states should impose an economic boycott on British trade, and drew up a petition to King George III, pleading for redress of their grievances and repeal of the Intolerable Acts. It did not propose independence or a separate government for the states.

The Second Continental Congress convened on May 10, 1775, and functioned as a de facto national government at the outset of the Revolutionary War. Beginning in 1777, the substantial powers assumed by Congress "made the league of states as cohesive and strong as any similar sort of republican confederation in history". The process created the United States "by the people in collectivity, rather than by the individual states", because only four states had constitutions at the time of the Declaration of Independence in 1776, and three of those were provisional.

The Supreme Court in Penhallow v. Doane's Administrators (1795), and again in Ware v. Hylton (1796), ruled on the federal government's powers prior to the adoption of the U.S. Constitution in 1788. It said that Congress exercised powers derived from the people, expressly conferred through the medium of state conventions or legislatures, and, once exercised, those powers were "impliedly ratified by the acquiescence and obedience of the people".

=== Confederation Period ===
The Articles of Confederation was approved by the Second Continental Congress on November 15, 1777, and sent to the states for ratification. It came into force on March 1, 1781, after being ratified by all 13 states. Over the previous four years it had been used by Congress as a "working document" to administer the early United States government and win the Revolutionary War.

Lasting successes under the Articles of Confederation included the Treaty of Paris with Britain and the Land Ordinance of 1785, whereby Congress promised settlers west of the Appalachian Mountains full citizenship and eventual statehood. Some historians characterize this period from 1781 to 1789 as weakness, dissension, and turmoil. Other scholars view the evidence as reflecting an underlying stability and prosperity. But the returning of prosperity in some areas did not slow the growth of domestic and foreign problems. Nationalists saw the confederation's central government as not strong enough to establish a sound financial system, regulate trade, enforce treaties, or go to war when needed.

The Congress of the Confederation, as defined in the Articles of Confederation, was the sole organ of the national government; there was no national court to interpret laws nor an executive branch to enforce them. Governmental functions, including declarations of war and calls for an army, were voluntarily supported by each state, in full, partly, or not at all.

The newly independent states, separated from Britain, no longer received favored treatment at British ports. The British refused to negotiate a commercial treaty in 1785 because the individual American states would not be bound by it. Congress could not act directly upon the States nor upon individuals. It had no authority to regulate foreign or interstate commerce. Every act of government was left to the individual States. Each state levied taxes and tariffs on other states at will, which invited retaliation. Congress could vote itself mediator and judge in state disputes, but states did not have to accept its decisions.

The weak central government could not back its policies with military strength, embarrassing it in foreign affairs. The British refused to withdraw their troops from the forts and trading posts in the new nation's Northwest Territory, as they had agreed to do in the Treaty of Paris of 1783. British officers on the northern boundaries and Spanish officers to the south supplied arms to Native American tribes, allowing them to attack American settlers. The Spanish refused to allow western American farmers to use their port of New Orleans to ship produce.

Revenues were requisitioned by Congressional petition to each state. None paid what they were asked; sometimes some paid nothing. Congress appealed to the thirteen states for an amendment to the Articles to tax enough to pay the public debt as principal came due. Twelve states agreed, Rhode Island did not, so it failed. The Articles required super majorities. Amendment proposals to states required ratification by all thirteen states, all important legislation needed 70% approval, at least nine states. Repeatedly, one or two states defeated legislative proposals of major importance.

Without taxes the government could not pay its debt. Seven of the thirteen states printed large quantities of their own paper money, backed by gold, land, or nothing, so there was no fair exchange rate among them. State courts required state creditors to accept payments at face value with a fraction of real purchase power. The same legislation that these states used to wipe out the Revolutionary debt to patriots was used to pay off promised veteran pensions. The measures were popular because they helped both small farmers and plantation owners pay off their debts.

The Massachusetts legislature was one of the five against paper money. It imposed a tightly limited currency and high taxes. Without paper money veterans without cash lost their farms for back taxes. This triggered Shays' Rebellion to stop tax collectors and close the courts. Troops quickly suppressed the rebellion, but nationalists like George Washington warned, "There are combustibles in every state which a spark might set fire to."

== Prelude to the Constitutional Convention ==
=== Mount Vernon Conference ===
An important milestone in interstate cooperation outside the framework of the Articles of Confederation occurred in March 1785, when delegates representing Maryland and Virginia met in Virginia, to address navigational rights in the states's common waterways. (Note: Historians following Charles A. Beard emphasize this aspect of the U.S. Constitution. Although An Economic Interpretation of the Constitution of the United States is discredited among modern scholars, Beard's legacy is that the economic, financial and commercial aspects of American history are almost always included in a survey of any topic.) On March 28, 1785, the group drew up a thirteen-point proposal to govern the two states' rights on the Potomac River, Pocomoke River, and Chesapeake Bay. Known as the Mount Vernon Compact (formally titled the "Compact of 1785"), this agreement not only covered tidewater navigation but also extended to issues such as toll duties, commerce regulations, fishing rights, and debt collection. Ratified by the legislatures of both states, the compact, which is still in force, helped set a precedent for later meetings between states for discussions into areas of mutual concern. (Note: The meeting at Mount Vernon was past and prologue. All nine were leaders in the Revolution, seven served in the Continental Congress. Five attended the Constitutional Convention, one later served the new government as Attorney General, two on the Supreme Court, and two as President. In the Revolution, three served in uniform, two were judges, two merchants, one financier. Two had been immigrants. The host was George Washington, General of the Continental Army, President of the Constitutional Convention and first U.S. President. Commissioner and Virginia jurist George Mason was the "Father of the Virginia Bill of Rights" and attended the Constitutional Convention and the Virginia Ratification Convention. Edmund Randolph, was a Continental Army officer, member of Congress and the Constitutional Convention, would be Virginia governor and U.S. Attorney General. (Neither Randolph nor Madison actually attended the conference; Gov. Patrick Henry had not informed them of the date.) James Madison, signer of the Declaration, member of Congress, "Father of the Constitution" at the Convention, led the Virginia Ratification Convention, "Father of the Bill of Rights", and President. Alexander Henderson served during the Revolution as an officer in the Virginia militia. He was a Scottish-born merchant, the "Father of the American chain store". The Maryland commissioners included jurist Thomas Johnson from England. He was the first independent Governor of Maryland and member of Congress serving on a finance committee with later Convention members Benjamin Franklin, John Dickinson and future Chief Justice John Jay. Johnson himself would be a U.S. Supreme Court Justice. Wealthy Thomas Stone was a signer of the Declaration of Independence, and championed Union when Maryland was reluctantly the last to sign the Articles of Confederation. Daniel of St. Thomas Jenifer was a member of Congress who worked with Benjamin Franklin, James Madison, John Dickinson and George Washington. Jenifer was the financial administrator for Maryland who helped it recover from economic depression, and a member of the Constitutional Convention. Samuel Chase signed the Declaration of Independence and served on the U.S. Supreme Court.)

The conference's success encouraged James Madison to introduce a proposal in the Virginia General Assembly for further debate of interstate issues. With Maryland's agreement, on January 21, 1786, Virginia invited all the states to attend another interstate meeting later that year in Annapolis, Maryland, to discuss the trade barriers between the various states.

=== Reforms considered for the Articles. ===
The Congress of the Confederation received a report on August 7, 1786, from a twelve-member "Grand Committee", appointed to develop and present "such amendments to the Confederation, and such resolutions as it may be necessary to recommend to the several states, for the purpose of obtaining from them such powers as will render the federal government adequate to" its declared purposes. Seven amendments to the Articles of Confederation were proposed. Under these reforms, Congress would gain "sole and exclusive" power to regulate trade. States could not favor foreigners over citizens. Tax bills would require 70% vote, public debt 85%, not 100%. Congress could charge states a late payment penalty fee. A state withholding troops would be charged for them, plus a penalty. If a state did not pay, Congress could collect directly from its cities and counties. A state payment on another's requisition would earn annual 6%. There would have been a national court of seven. No-shows at Congress would have been banned from any U.S. or state office. These proposals were, however, sent back to committee without a vote and were not taken up again.

=== Annapolis Convention ===
The Annapolis Convention, formally titled "A Meeting of Commissioners to Remedy Defects of the Federal Government", convened at George Mann's Tavern on September 11, 1786. Delegates from five states gathered to discuss ways to facilitate commerce between the states and establish standard rules and regulations. At the time, each state was largely independent from the others and the national government had no authority in these matters.

Appointed delegates from four states either arrived too late to participate or otherwise decided not attend. Because so few states were present, delegates did not deem "it advisable to proceed on the business of their mission." However, they did adopt a report calling for another convention of the states to discuss possible improvements to the Articles of Confederation. They desired that Constitutional Convention take place in Philadelphia in the summer of 1787.

Legislatures of seven states—Virginia, New Jersey, Pennsylvania, North Carolina, New Hampshire, Delaware, and Georgia—immediately approved and appointed their delegations. New York and others hesitated thinking that only the Continental Congress could propose amendments to the Articles. Congress then called the convention at Philadelphia. The "Federal Constitution" was to be changed to meet the requirements of good government and "the preservation of the Union". Congress would then approve what measures it allowed, then the state legislatures would unanimously confirm whatever changes of those were to take effect.

== Constitutional Convention ==
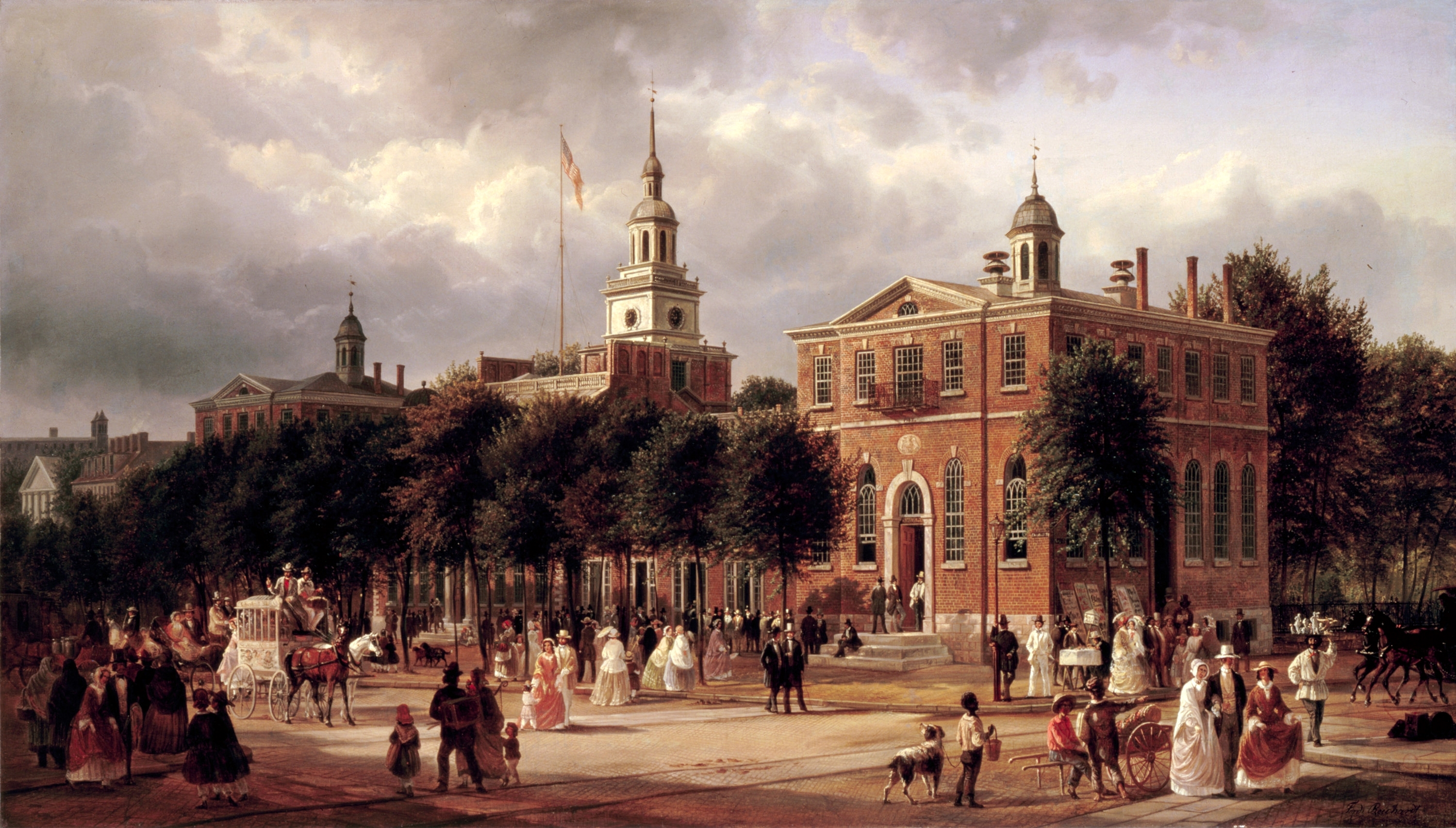
Independence Hall, south wing. Philadelphia

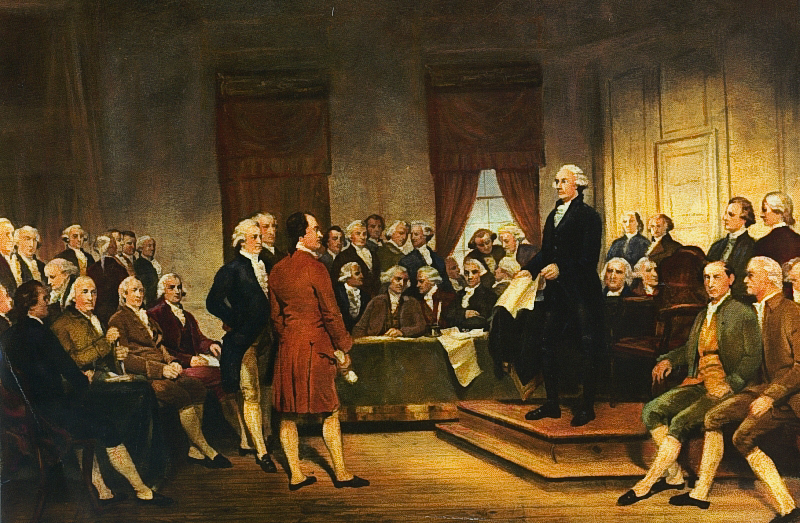
Washington as Convention President

Twelve state legislatures, Rhode Island being the only exception, sent delegates to convene at Philadelphia in May 1787. While the resolution calling the Convention specified that its purpose was to propose amendments to the Articles, through discussion and debate it became clear by mid-June that the convention would propose a Constitution with a fundamentally new design.

=== Sessions ===
The Congress of the Confederation endorsed a plan to revise the Articles of Confederation on February 21, 1787. It called on each state legislature to send delegates to a convention "'for the sole and express purpose of revising the Articles of Confederation' in ways that, when approved by Congress and the states, would 'render the federal constitution adequate to the exigencies of government and the preservation of the Union.'"

To amend the Articles into a workable government, 74 delegates from the twelve states were named by their state legislatures; 55 showed up, and 39 eventually signed. On May 3, eleven days early, James Madison arrived to Philadelphia and met with James Wilson of the Pennsylvania delegation to plan strategy. Madison outlined his plan in letters: (1) State legislatures shall each send delegates instead of using members of the Congress of the Confederation. (2) The convention will reach agreement with signatures from every state. (3) The Congress of the Confederation will approve it and forward it to the state legislatures. (4) The state legislatures independently call one-time conventions to ratify it, using delegates selected via each state's various rules of suffrage. The convention was to be "merely advisory" to the people voting in each state. (Note: In the event, the signed Constitution was merely forwarded to the state legislatures without amendment or endorsement. But the states did receive a recommendation that each call a ratification convention apart from the state legislature according to each state's suffrage and timing. All but Rhode Island did so. Rhode Island and North Carolina did not join the United States until after the Constitutional government began in 1789.)

Delegates to the Constitutional Convention
Order	Name	State represented
1	George Washington	Virginia
2	John Langdon	New Hampshire
3	Nicholas Gilman	New Hampshire
4	Nathaniel Gorham	Massachusetts
5	Rufus King	Massachusetts
6	William Samuel Johnson	Connecticut
7	Roger Sherman	Connecticut
8	Alexander Hamilton	New York
9	William Livingston	New Jersey
10	David Brearley	New Jersey
11	William Paterson	New Jersey
12	Jonathan Dayton	New Jersey
13	Benjamin Franklin	Pennsylvania
14	Thomas Mifflin	Pennsylvania
15	Robert Morris	Pennsylvania
16	George Clymer	Pennsylvania
17	Thomas FitzSimons	Pennsylvania
18	Jared Ingersoll	Pennsylvania
19	James Wilson	Pennsylvania
20	Gouverneur Morris	Pennsylvania
21	George Read	Delaware
22	Gunning Bedford Jr.	Delaware
23	John Dickinson	Delaware
24	Richard Bassett	Delaware
25	Jacob Broom	Delaware
26	James McHenry	Maryland
27	Daniel of St. Thomas Jenifer	Maryland
28	Daniel Carroll	Maryland
29	John Blair Jr.	Virginia
30	James Madison Jr.	Virginia
31	William Blount	North Carolina
32	Richard Dobbs Spaight	North Carolina
33	Hugh Williamson	North Carolina
34	John Rutledge	South Carolina
35	Charles Cotesworth Pinckney	South Carolina
36	Charles Pinckney	South Carolina
37	Pierce Butler	South Carolina
38	William Few	Georgia
39	Abraham Baldwin	Georgia
Χ	Elbridge Gerry	Massachusetts
Χ	George Mason	Virginia
Χ	Edmund Randolph	Virginia
⋈	William Davie	North Carolina
⋈	Oliver Ellsworth	Massachusetts
⋈	William Houston	New Jersey
⋈	William Houstoun	Georgia
⋈	John Lansing	New York
⋈	Alexander Martin	North Carolina
⋈	Luther Martin	Maryland
⋈	James McClurg	Virginia
⋈	John Mercer	Maryland
⋈	William Pierce	Georgia
⋈	Caleb Strong	Massachusetts
⋈	George Wythe	Virginia
⋈	Robert Yates	New York
Signed the Constitution; Refused to sign the Constitution; Dropped out of the convention

==== Convening and Rules ====
George Washington arrived on time, Sunday, the day before the scheduled opening. (Note: George Washington's participation lent prestige to the proceedings, attracting some of the best minds in America. Some 1776 notables did not attend, such as Tom Paine, Samuel Adams, Patrick Henry, of the older generation, and Thomas Jefferson, and John Adams, of the younger.) For the entire duration of the convention, Washington was a guest at the home of Robert Morris, Congress' financier for the American Revolution and a Pennsylvania delegate. Morris entertained the delegates lavishly. William Jackson, in two years to be the president of the Society of the Cincinnati, had been Morris' agent in England for a time; and he won election as a non-delegate to be the convention secretary.

The nationalists organize

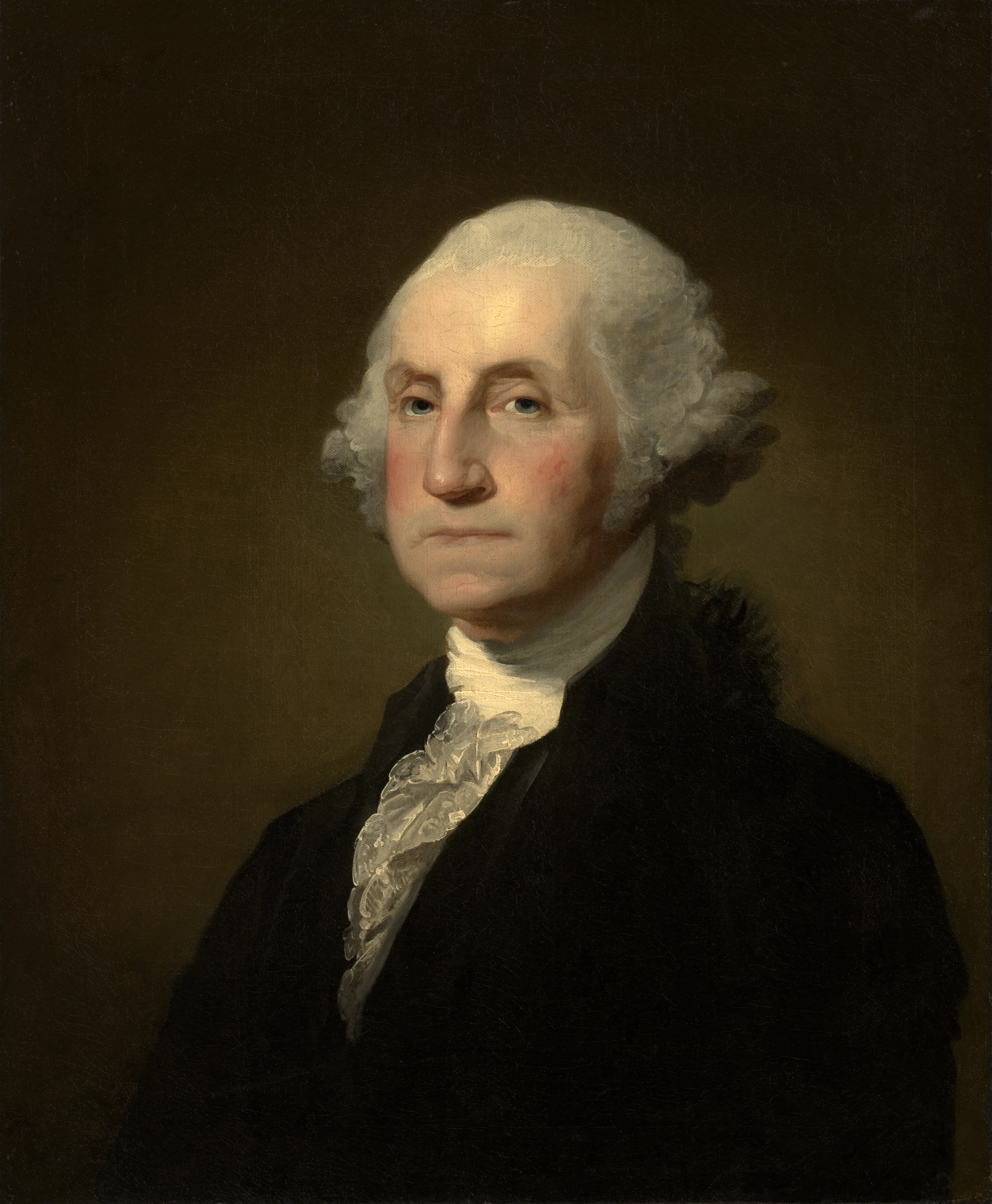
George Washington
Convention President

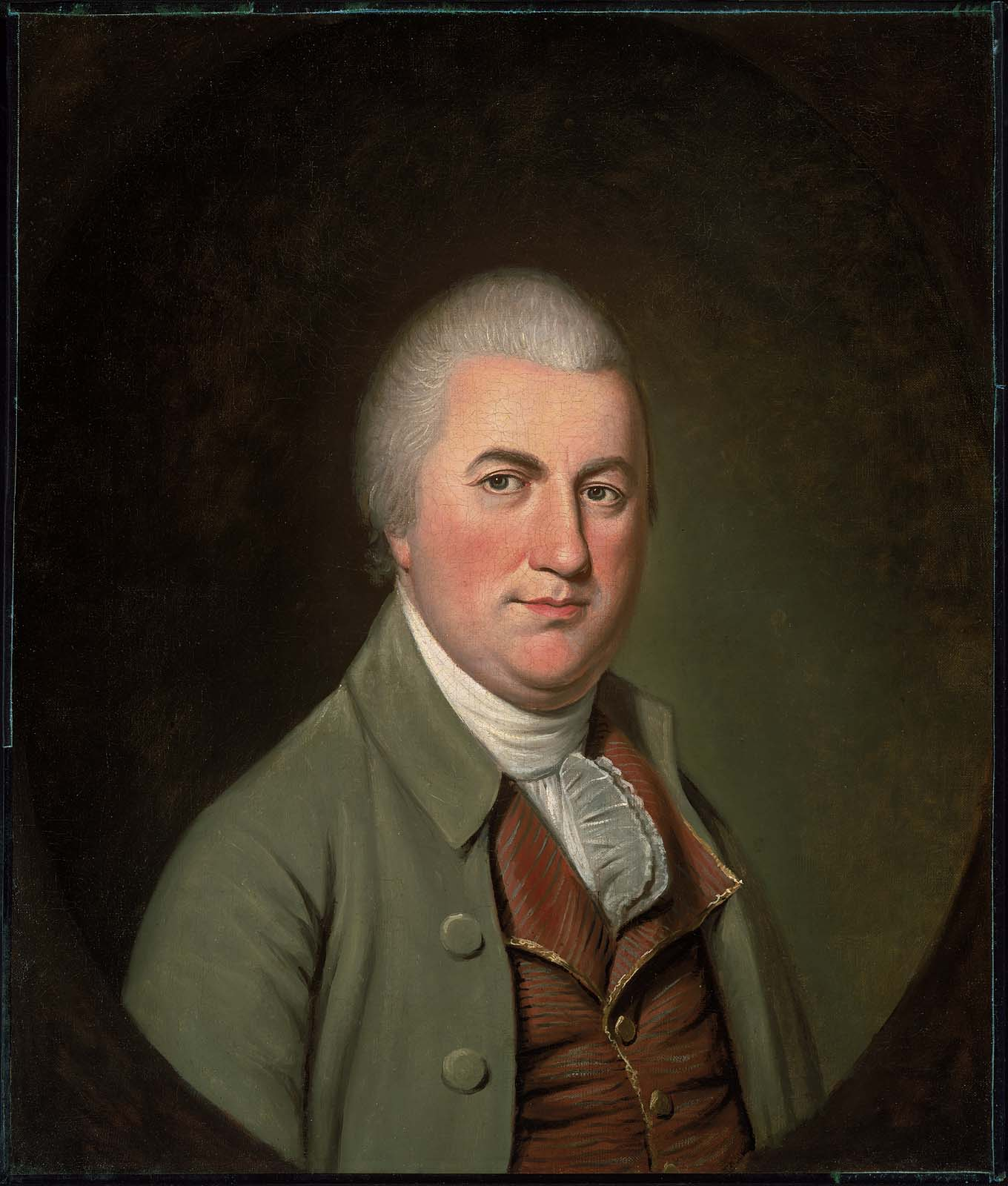
Nathaniel Gorham, MA
Chair, Cmte. of the Whole

The convention was scheduled to open May 14, but only Pennsylvania and Virginia delegations were present. The convention was postponed until a quorum of seven states gathered on Friday the 25th. (Note: In the Congress of the Confederation, a state could not be represented on the floor until two delegates were present. The Convention quorum of seven states was met the first day with New York with two of its five delegates present that first day, New Jersey with three, Pennsylvania with four of its eight, Delaware with three of its five, Virginia with all seven, North Carolina with four of its five, and South Carolina with all four. Massachusetts and Georgia had each one delegate of their respective four present on the 25th. See Constitutional Convention for a complete listing of state delegations arrived in Philadelphia.) George Washington was elected the Convention president, and Chancellor (judge) George Wythe (Va) was chosen Chair of the Rules Committee. The rules of the convention were published the following Monday. (Note: The rules of a formal body can determine outcomes. The nationalist "Federalists" will make a point of setting the rules to win the later ratification conventions. Their ratification strategy was to take up each article and section, with no votes on measures until completing the document. This delay suited different objectives. The intent was to persuade in Massachusetts, to accommodate in Virginia, and to await news in New York)

Nathaniel Gorham (MA) was elected Chair of the "Committee of the Whole". These were the same delegates in the same room, but they could use informal rules for the interconnected provisions in the draft articles to be made, remade and reconnected as the order of business proceeded. The Convention officials and adopted procedures were in place before the arrival of nationalist opponents such as John Lansing (NY) and Luther Martin (MD). (Note: In view of the Martin-Lansing "small state" positions and their importance in U.S. intellectual history, relative sizes of the states in 1787 can be ranked from the Constitution's enumeration for the first House of Representatives. States free or with gradual emancipation had 35 Representatives: Pennsylvania eight. Massachusetts eight, New York six, Connecticut five, New Jersey four, New Hampshire three, Rhode Island one. States with a sizable 3/5 bonus for non-citizen slaves had 30 representatives at first: Virginia ten, Maryland six, North Carolina five, South Carolina five, Georgia three and Delaware one. (See U.S. Constitution, Article I, Section 2.)) By the end of May, the stage was set.

The Constitutional Convention voted to keep the debates secret so that the delegates could speak freely, negotiate, bargain, compromise and change. Yet the proposed Constitution as reported from the convention was an "innovation", the most dismissive epithet a politician could use to condemn any new proposal. It promised a fundamental change from the old confederation into a new, consolidated yet federal government. The accepted secrecy of usual affairs conducted in regular order did not apply. It became a major issue in the very public debates leading up to the crowd-filled ratification conventions. (Note: Both the British House of Commons and their North American colonial assemblies were secret. Debates of the Congress of the Confederation were not reported.)

Despite the public outcry against secrecy among its critics, the delegates continued in positions of public trust. State legislatures chose ten Convention delegates of their 33 total for the Constitutional Convention that September.

==== Quorum ====
Nationalist floor leaders from biggest states

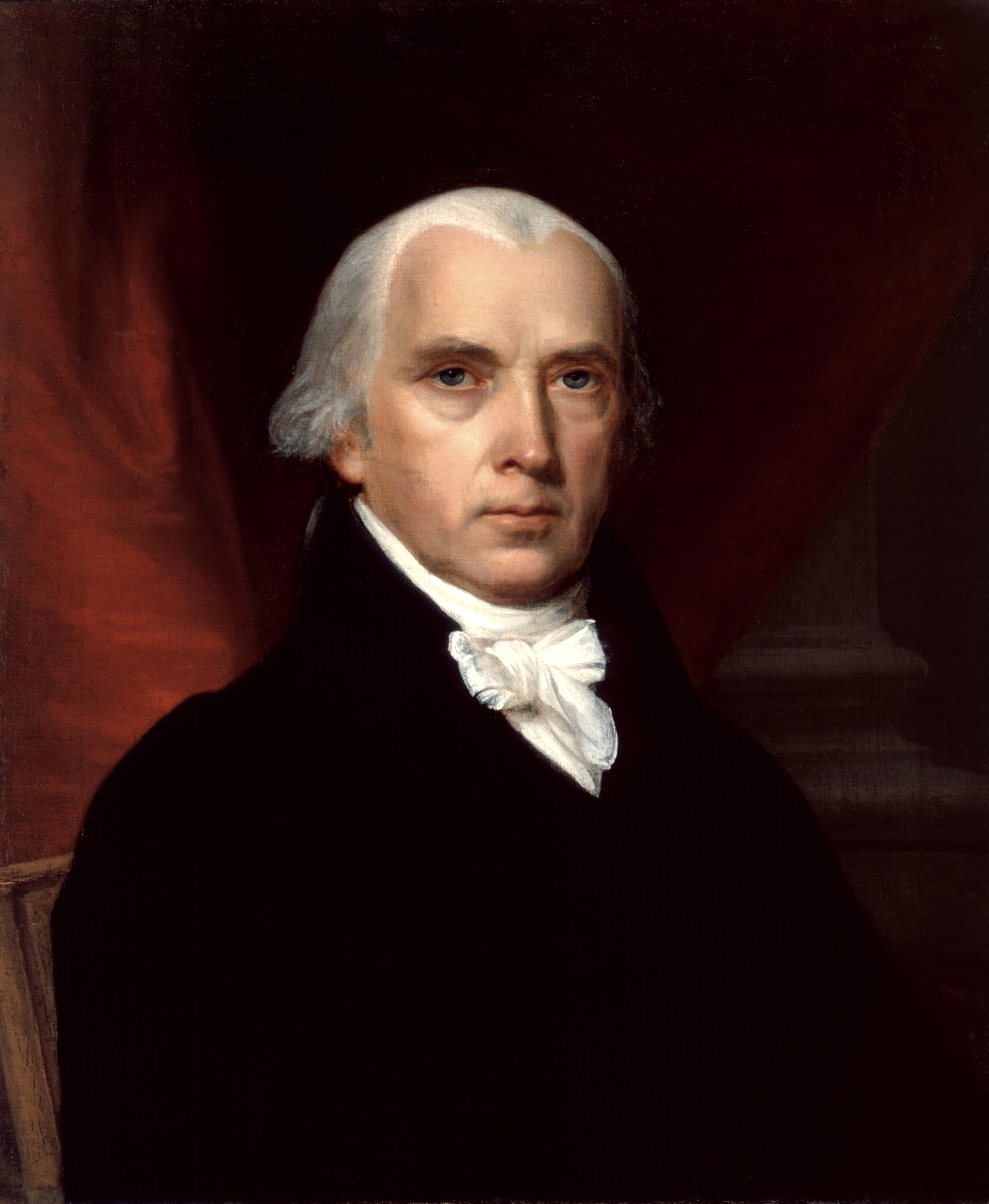
James Madison, VA
"Father of the Constitution"

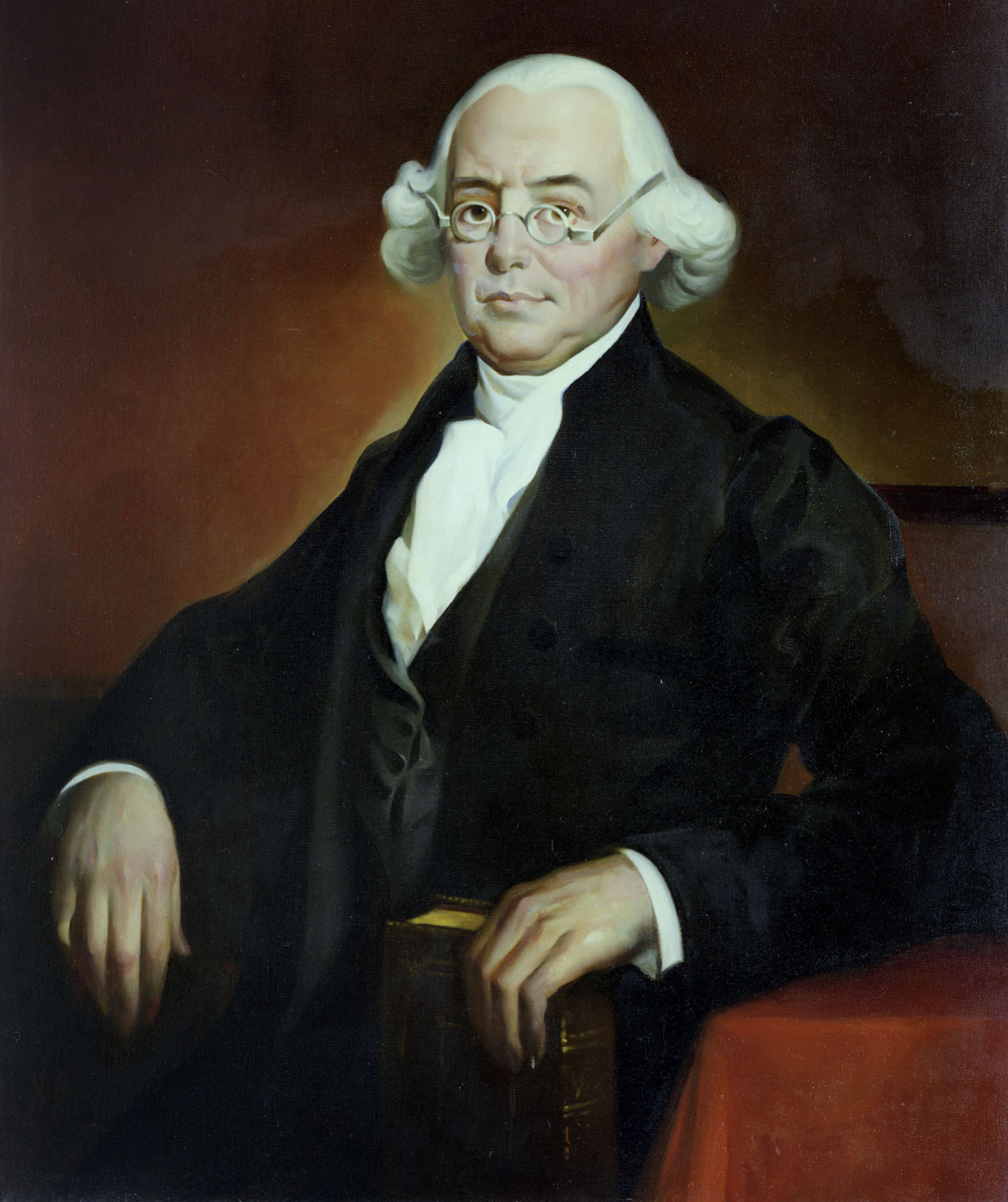
James Wilson, PA
"unsung hero of Convention"

Every few days, new delegates arrived, happily noted in Madison's Journal. But as the Convention went on, individual delegates coming and going meant that a state's vote could change with the change of delegation composition. The volatility added to the inherent difficulties, making for an "ever-present danger that the Convention might dissolve and the entire project be abandoned."

Although twelve states sent delegations, there were never more than eleven represented in the floor debates, often fewer. State delegations absented themselves at votes different times of day. There was no minimum for a state delegation; one would do. Daily sessions would have thirty members present. Members came and went on public and personal business. The Congress of the Confederation was meeting at the same time, so members would absent themselves to New York City on Congressional business for days and weeks at a time.

But the work before them was continuous, even if attendance was not. The Convention resolved itself into a "Committee of the Whole", and could remain so for days. It was informal, votes could be taken and retaken easily, positions could change without prejudice, and importantly, no formal quorum call was required. The nationalists were resolute. As Madison put it, the situation was too serious for despair. They used the same State House, later named Independence Hall, as the Declaration signers. The building setback from the street was still dignified, but the "shaky" steeple was gone. When they adjourned each day, they lived in nearby lodgings, as guests, roomers or renters. They ate supper with one another in town and taverns, "often enough in preparation for tomorrow's meeting."

Delegates reporting to the Convention presented their credentials to the Secretary, Major William Jackson of South Carolina. The state legislatures of the day used these occasions to say why they were sending representatives abroad. New York thus publicly enjoined its members to pursue all possible "alterations and provisions" for good government and "preservation of the Union". New Hampshire called for "timely measures to enlarge the powers of Congress". Virginia stressed the "necessity of extending the revision of the federal system to all its defects". Conversely, Delaware categorically forbade any alteration of the Articles one-vote-per-state provision in the Articles of Confederation. The convention would have a great deal of work to do to reconcile the many expectations in the chamber. At the same time, delegates wanted to finish their work by fall harvest and its commerce.

==== Agenda ====
Consolidated national v. pure &quot;federal&quot;

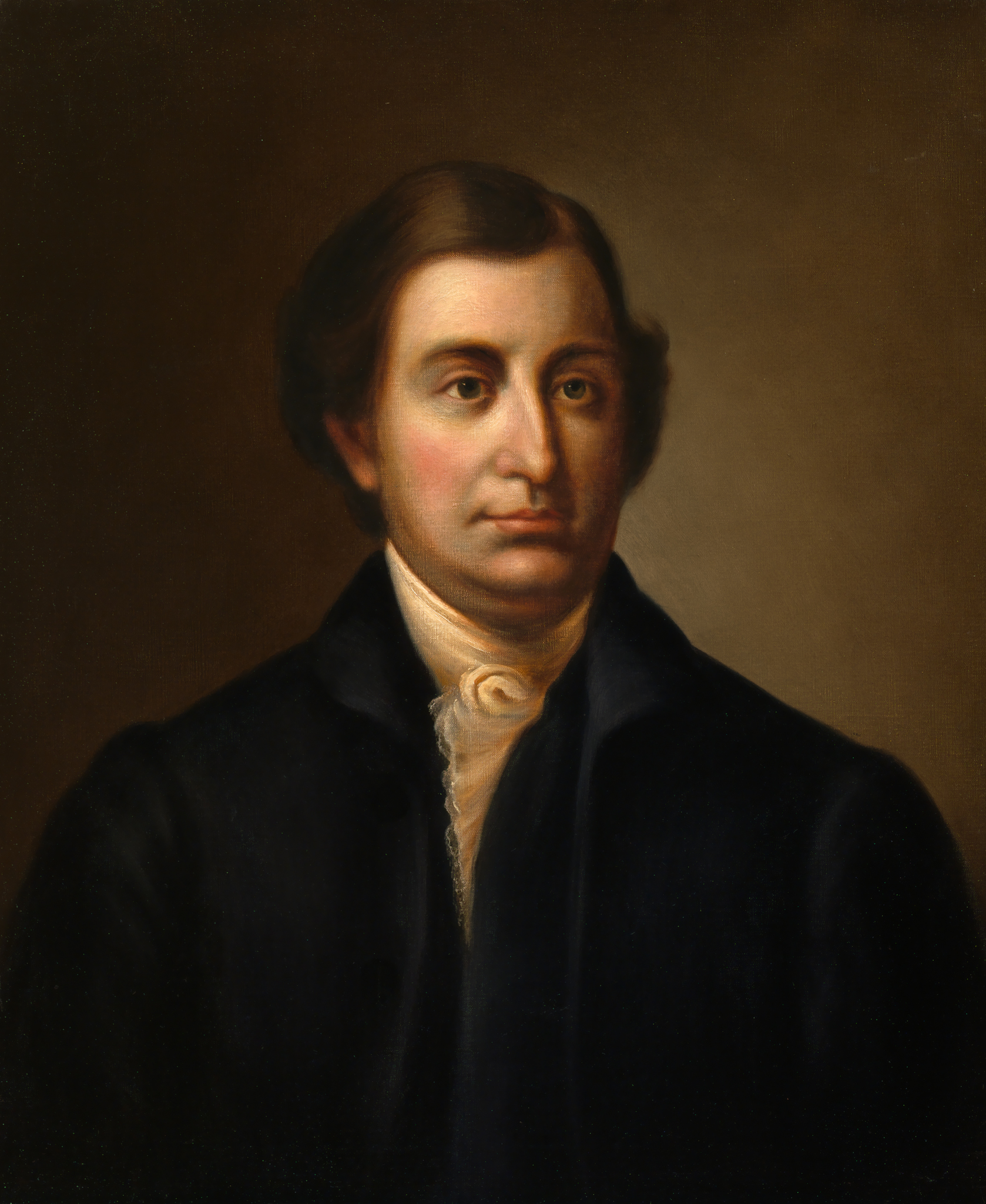
Edmund Randolph, VA
consolidated government

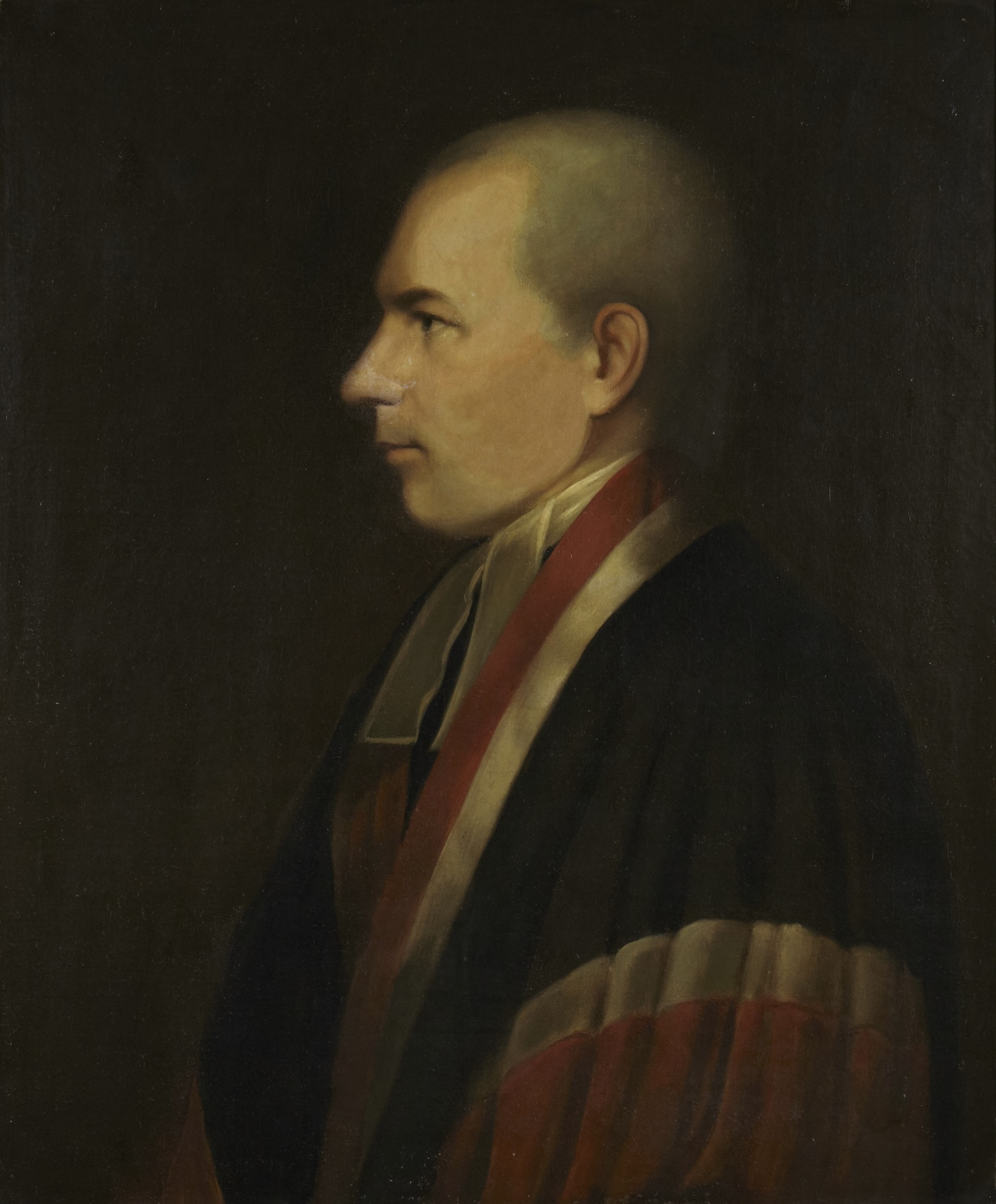
William Paterson, NJ
states and congress equal

On May 29, Edmund Randolph (VA) proposed the Virginia Plan, which unofficially set the agenda for the convention. It was weighted toward the interests of the larger, more populous states. The intent was to meet the purposes set out in the Articles of Confederation, "common defense, security of liberty and general welfare". The Virginia Plan was national, authority flowed from the people. If the people will ratify them, changes for better republican government and national union should be proposed.

Much of the Virginia Plan was adopted. (Note: Elements of Randolph's "Virginia Plan" proposal as submitted were not adopted. Members of Congress did not have one term, then barred from any U.S. or state office for a number of years after. A 'senate' was not apportioned by state taxes paid. The 'senate' is not elected by the 'house' from state legislature nominees. Congress does not veto state laws, and coerce noncompliant states. The 'president' might be elected by Congress for two terms. A "council of revision" made up of the 'president' and some of the 'supreme court' could veto any act of Congress or veto of state legislature. None of these provisions were incorporated into the draft "Constitution" as forwarded by Congress to the states for their ratification conventions of representatives of the people voting, as each state legislature allowed.) All the powers in the Articles transfer to the new government. Congress has two houses, the 'house' apportioned by population. It can enact laws affecting more than one state and Congress can override a veto. The President can enforce the law. The Supreme Court and inferior courts rule on international, U.S. and state law. The Constitution is the supreme law and all state officers swear to uphold the Constitution. Every state is a republic, and new states can be admitted. The Congress of the Confederation continued until the new system started. Amendments are possible without Congress. The Convention recommendations went to Congress, from them to the states. State legislatures set the election rules for ratification conventions, and the people "expressly" chose representatives to consider and decide about the Constitution.

June 15, William Paterson (NJ) proposed the Convention minority's New Jersey Plan. It was weighted toward the interests of the smaller, less populous states. The intent was to preserve the states from a plan to "destroy or annihilate" them. The New Jersey Plan was purely federal, authority flowed from the states. Gradual change should come from the states. If the Articles could not be amended, then advocates argued that should be the report from the convention to the states.

Although the New Jersey Plan only survived three days as a proposal, it served as an important alternative to the Virginia Plan. Substantial elements of the New Jersey Plan were eventually adopted. (Note: Elements of Paterson's "New Jersey Plan" proposal as submitted were not adopted. State courts did not interpret federal legislation, with appeals to the Supreme Court only. States in the Union cannot be "diminished". Presidents are one person, not three persons. Presidents can serve more than one term. A majority of state Governors cannot remove a President. The rule of naturalization was not the same for every state in the 19th Century. Immigrants could become citizens and vote in northern states years before they were eligible for U.S. citizenship. Powers not expressly enumerated belong to the states was out-voted in Convention, but in the first ten amendments, the Tenth Amendment specifies powers not expressly given to the Congress reside with the states or with the people.) The articles were "revised, corrected and enlarged" for good government and preservation of the Union. The Senate is elected by the states, at first by the state legislatures. Congress passes acts for revenue collected directly in the states, and the rulings of state courts are reviewed by the Supreme Court. State apportionment for taxes failed, but the 'house' is apportioned by the population count of free inhabitants and three-fifths of others originally. States can be added to the Union. Presidents appoint federal judges. Treaties entered into by Congress are the supreme law of the land. All state judiciaries are bound to enforce treaties, state laws notwithstanding. The President can raise an army to enforce treaties in any state. States treat a violation of law in another state as though it happened there.

Current knowledge of drafting the Constitution comes primarily from the Journal left by James Madison, found chronologically incorporated in Max Farrand's "The Records of the Federal Convention of 1787", which included the Convention Journal and sources from other Federalists and Anti-Federalists.

Scholars observe that it is unusual in world history for the minority in a revolution to have the influence that the "old patriot" Anti-Federalists had over the "nationalist" Federalists who had the support of the revolutionary army in the Society of the Cincinnati. Both factions were intent on forging a nation in which both could be full participants in the changes which were sure to come, since that was most likely to allow for their national union, guarantee liberty for their posterity, and promote their mutual long-term material prosperity.

==== Debate Over Slavery ====
The contentious issue of slavery was too controversial to be resolved during the convention. But it was at center stage in the Convention three times: June 7 regarding who would vote for Congress, June 11 in debate over how to proportion relative seating in the 'house', and August 22 relating to commerce and the future wealth of the nation.

Once the Convention looked at how to proportion the House representation, tempers among several delegates exploded over slavery. When the Convention progressed beyond the personal attacks, it adopted the existing "federal ratio" for taxing states by three-fifths of slaves held.

On August 6, the Committee of Detail reported its proposed revisions to the Randolph Plan. Again the question of slavery came up, and again the question was met with attacks of outrage. Over the next two weeks, delegates wove a web of mutual compromises relating to commerce and trade, east and west, slave-holding and free. The transfer of power to regulate slave trade from states to central government could happen in 20 years, but only then. (Note: The Constitution sets up a bicameral legislature which enacts law only if there are national majorities both among (a) the states in the 'senate' and (b) the people in the 'house'. At the time the Constitution was ratified, it balanced states equally relative to slavery in the Senate. There were six states north of Pennsylvania, and six states south of it. Pennsylvania, the "keystone" state, split Senators one-one at first. After Pennsylvania abolished slavery, the next state to enter the Union in 1792 was Kentucky, which was admitted with slavery. That action maintained a "sectional equality" between free-soil states and slave-holding states, 7–7. Then in 1850, California was admitted as a free state, then Minnesota, Oregon and Kansas followed as free states before outbreak of the Civil War. The Constitution's House of Representatives began nearly equal, but the decennial census reallocated power away from declining slave-economies and towards the places which supported more people. Over time, ten years at a time, under the Constitution, the state antecedents, wealth, commerce and militias matter less than the numbers of people it can sustain in its domestic economy.) Later generations could try out their own answers. The delegates were trying to make a government that might last that long.

Migration of the free or "importation" of indentures and slaves could continue by states, defining slaves as persons, not property. Long-term power would change by population as counted every ten years. Apportionment in the House would not be by wealth, it would be by people, the free citizens and three-fifths the number of other persons meaning propertyless slaves and taxed Indian farming families. (Note: Section 2 of Article I provides in part: "Representatives and direct taxes shall be apportioned among the several states ... by adding to the whole number of free persons, including those bound to service for a term of years, and excluding Indians not taxed, three-fifths of all other persons." State population for U.S. representation or taxes was to exclude all numbers of untaxed Native-Americans.—"Representatives and direct taxes shall be apportioned among the several states ... by adding to the whole number of free persons, including those bound to service for a term of years, and excluding Indians not taxed, three-fifths of all other persons.)

In 1806, President Thomas Jefferson sent a message to the 9th Congress on their constitutional opportunity to remove U.S. citizens from the transatlantic slave trade "[violating] human rights". The 1807 "Act Prohibiting Importation of Slaves" took effect the first instant the Constitution allowed, January 1, 1808. The United States joined the British that year in the first "international humanitarian campaign".

In the 1840–1860 era abolitionists denounced the Fugitive Slave Clause and other protections of slavery. William Lloyd Garrison famously declared the Constitution "a covenant with death and an agreement with Hell."

In ratification conventions, the anti-slavery delegates sometimes began as anti-ratification votes. Still, the Constitution "as written" was an improvement over the Articles from an abolitionist point of view. The Constitution provided for abolition of the slave trade but the Articles did not. The outcome could be determined gradually over time. Sometimes contradictions among opponents were used to try to gain abolitionist converts. In Virginia, Federalist George Nicholas dismissed fears on both sides. Objections to the Constitution were inconsistent, "At the same moment it is opposed for being promotive and destructive of slavery!" But the contradiction was never resolved peaceably, and the failure to do so contributed to the Civil War.

=== "Great" Connecticut Compromise ===
Leaders of Compromise

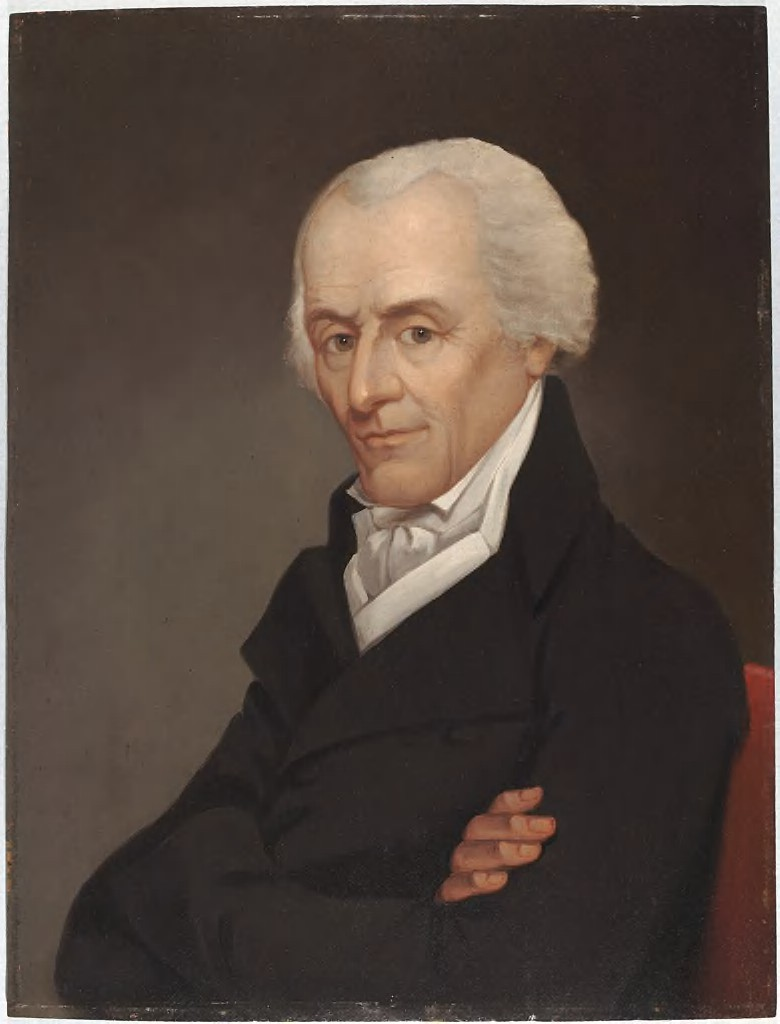
Elbridge Gerry, MA
Chair of the First Committee on Representation

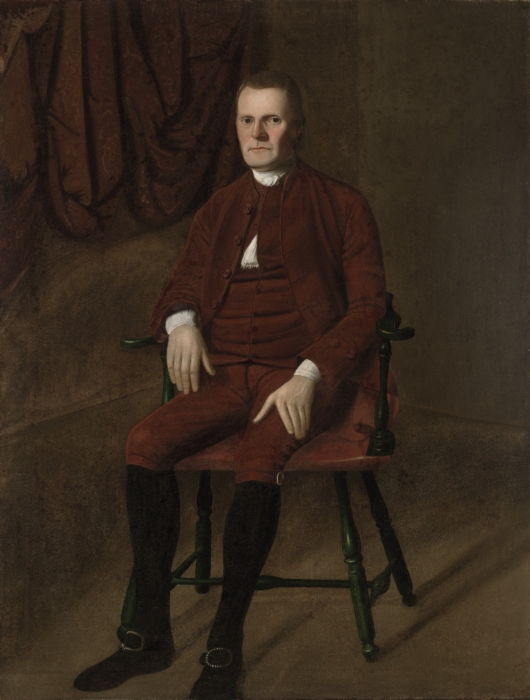
Roger Sherman, CT
Architect of the Connecticut Compromise

Roger Sherman (CT) proved to be a pivotal, though unlikely, leader at the convention. (Note: He was the son of a shoemaker, now a farmer and lawyer. Although awkward, vulgar and laughable to more polished colleagues, he was an honest political broker. The most frequent speakers on the Convention floor were Madison, Wilson, G. Morris — all nationalists. Roger Sherman of Connecticut, a small-state 'federal' delegate, was fourth. His legislative philosophy was, "When you are a minority, talk. When you are a majority, vote." Among the small-state advocates, he would make the most speeches throughout the Convention. Arriving right behind the nationalist leaders on May 30, Sherman was reported to prefer a "patch up" of the existing Confederacy. Another small state delegate, George Read (DE) agreed with the nationalists that state legislatures were a national problem. But rather than see larger states overshadow the small, he'd prefer to see all state boundaries erased. Big-state versus small-state antagonisms hardened early.) On June 11, he proposed the first version of the convention's "Great Compromise". Similar to a proposal he made in the 1776 Continental Congress, Sherman's plan suggested that representation in Congress should be both by states and by population. The small states voted down this proposition, insisting that all states should be equal in at least one chamber of the legislature, with each state having one vote only.

At the 1787 Convention, he wanted to balance all the big-state victories for population apportionment. He proposed that in the second branch of the legislature, which he referred to as the senate, each state should be equal, one vote and no more. (Note: The nationalists had proposed a senate smaller than the house, but still proportioned by population a state's population: one senator for small, two senators for medium, and three senators for large populations. Sherman argued that the bicameral British Parliament had a House of Lords equal with the House of Commons to protect their propertied interests apart from the people. He was voted down, this time by the big states.) The motion for equal state representation in a senate failed: 6 against, 5 for.

After these defeats, the delegates who called themselves the "old patriots" of 1776 and the "men of original principles" organized a caucus in the convention. William Paterson (NJ) spoke for them introducing his "New Jersey Plan". (Note: The most important were Lansing and Yates (NY), Bedford (DE), Paterson and Brearly (NJ) and Martin (MD). Other supporters of note were Mason (VA), Gerry (MA), Ellsworth and Sherman (CT).) Roger Sherman (CT), a signer of the Declaration of Independence, was with them. Supporters explained that it "sustained the sovereignty of the states", while the Edmund Randolph (VA) "Virginia Plan" erased it. The convention had no authority to propose anything not sent up from state legislatures, and the states were not likely to adopt anything new. The "nationalists" answered, The convention could not conclude anything, but it could recommend anything.

"Patriots" said if their legislature knew anything about proposals for consolidated government, it would not have sent anyone. "Nationalists" countered, that it would be treason to withhold any proposal for good government when the salvation of the American republic was at stake. Three sessions after its introduction, the New Jersey Plan failed : 7 against, 3 for, 1 divided. For nearly a month there was no progress; small states were seriously thinking of walking out of the convention. (Note: Yates and Lansing (NY) would walk out July 10. New York voted as a "small" state on big-state-small-state issues. It had no western frontier like Pennsylvania and Virginia, for instance. In 1787, the Erie Canal did not tie New York to the west, and Philadelphia was still the nation's largest commercial and banking center, followed by Boston.)

Then June 25, the "original principles" men finally won a vote. The 'senate' would be chosen by the state legislatures, not the people, passed: 9 for, 2 against. The basis of representation for both the 'house' and the 'senate' re-surfaced. Sherman tried a second time to get his idea for a 'house' on the basis of population and a 'senate' on an equal states basis. The "big states" got their population 'house' win, then his equal state 'senate' motion was dropped without a vote. The majority adjourned "before a determination was taken in the House." Luther Martin (MD) insisted that he would rather divide the Union into regional governments than submit to a consolidated government under the Randolph Plan.

Sherman's proposal came up again for the third time from Oliver Ellsworth (CT). In the "senate", the states should have equal representation. Advocates said that it could not be agreed to, the union would fall apart somehow. Big states would not be trusted, the small states could confederate with a foreign power showing "more good faith". If delegates could not unite behind this here, one day the states could be united by "some foreign sword". On the question of equal state representation, the Convention adjourned in the same way again, "before a determination was taken in the House.".

On July 2, the convention for the fourth time considered a "senate" with equal state votes. This time a vote was taken, but it stalled again, tied at 5 yes, 5 no, 1 divided. The Convention elected one delegate out of the delegation of each state onto a Committee to make a proposal; it reported July 5. Nothing changed over five days. July 10, Lansing and Yates (NY) quit the Convention in protest over the big state majorities repeatedly overrunning the small state delegations in vote after vote. No direct vote on the basis of 'senate' representation was pushed on the floor for another week.

With delegates unable to reconcile their differences, the Convention elected one delegate from each state to the First Committee on Representation to make a proposal. Unlike debate in the Committee of the Whole, the membership of the committee, led by Elbridge Gerry and including Sherman, was carefully selected and was more sympathetic to the views of the small states. The membership of the committee made a compromise amongst delegates more likely. After meeting, the Committee reported its proposal on July 5. The Committee proposed a bicameral legislature with proportional representation in the House and equal state representation in the Senate. As a concession to large states, all bills raising revenue had to originate in the House.

Nothing changed for five days until Lansing and Yates (NY) left the Convention in protest over the large state majorities repeatedly overrunning the small state delegations in vote after vote. No direct vote on the basis of 'senate' representation was pushed on the floor for another week. But the Convention floor leaders kept moving forward where they could. First the new 'house' seat apportionment was agreed, balancing big and small, north and south. The big states got a decennial census for 'house' apportionment to reflect their future growth. Northerners had insisted on counting only free citizens for the 'house'; southern delegations wanted to add property. Benjamin Franklin's compromise was that there would be no "property" provision to add representatives, but states with large slave populations would get a bonus added to their free persons by counting three-fifths other persons.

On July 16, Sherman's "Great Compromise" prevailed on its fifth try. Every state was to have equal numbers in the United States Senate. Washington ruled it passed on the vote 5 yes, 4 no, 1 divided. It was not that five states constituted a majority of twelve, but to keep the business moving forward, he relied on precedent established earlier in the Convention that only a majority of states voting was required. The First Committee on Representation and the Connecticut Compromise became the turning point of the convention. While some of the large-state delegates discussed leaving the convention, none did. Debate over the next ten days developed an agreed general outline for the Constitution. Small states readily yielded on many questions. Following the Compromise, most remaining delegates, large-state and small-state, felt safe enough to chance a new plan.

=== Two new branches ===
Ruler as Chief Magistrate

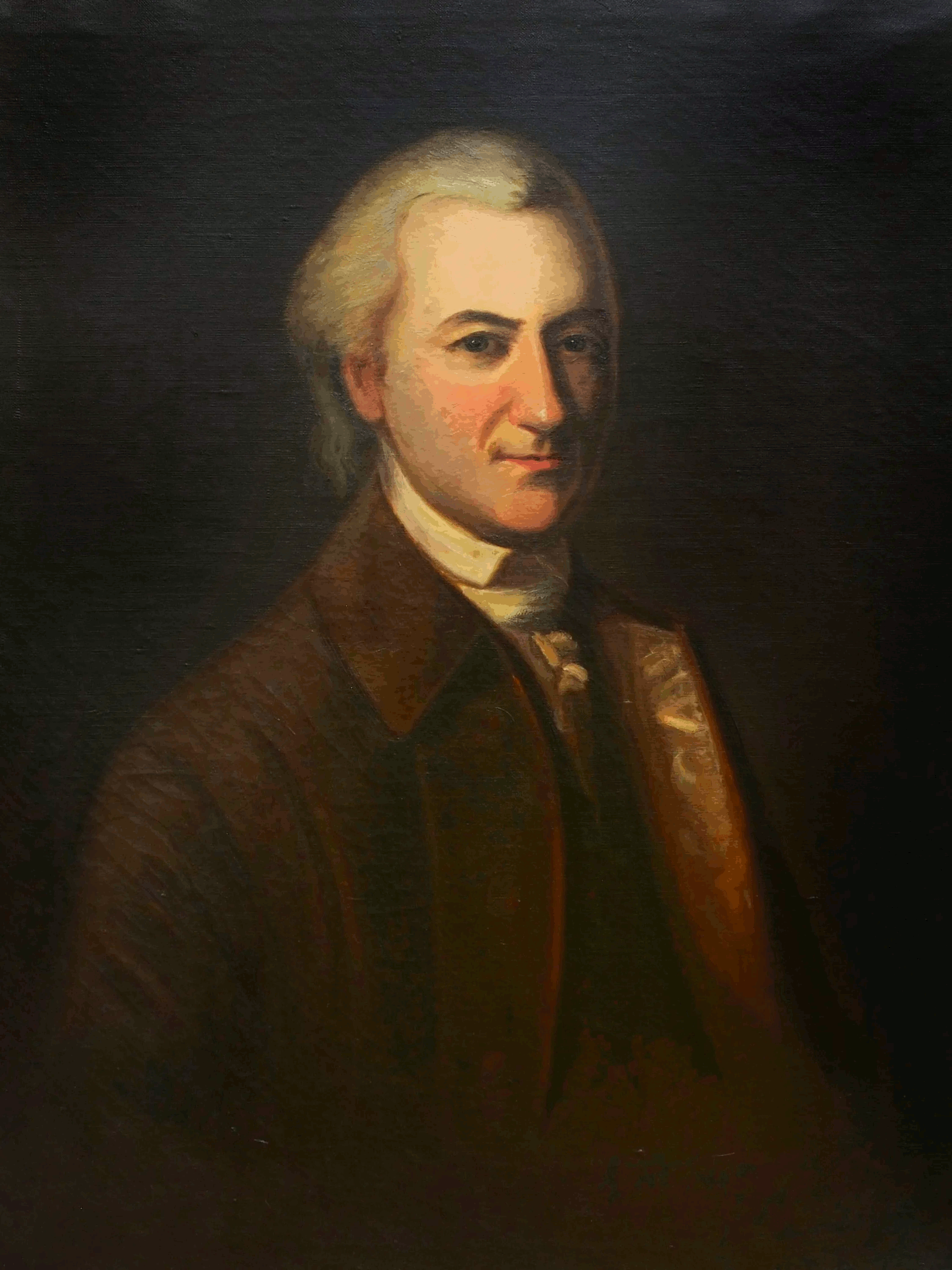
John Dickinson, DE
for one-person president

The Constitution innovated two branches of government that were not a part of the U.S. government during the Articles of Confederation. Previously, a thirteen-member committee had been left behind in Philadelphia when Congress adjourned to carry out the "executive" functions. Suits between states were referred to the Congress of the Confederation, and treated as a private bill to be determined by majority vote of members attending that day.

On June 7, the "national executive" was taken up in Convention. The "chief magistrate" (or presidency) was of serious concern for a formerly colonial people fearful of concentrated power in one person. But to secure a "vigorous executive", nationalist delegates such as James Wilson (PA), Charles Pinckney (SC), and John Dickinson (DE) favored a single officer. They had someone in mind whom everyone could trust to start off the new system, George Washington.

After introducing the item for discussion, there was a prolonged silence. Benjamin Franklin (PA) and John Rutledge (SC) had urged everyone to speak their minds freely. When addressing the issue with George Washington in the room, delegates were careful to phrase their objections to potential offenses by officers chosen in the future who would be 'president' "subsequent" to the start-up. Roger Sherman (CT), Edmund Randolph (VA) and Pierce Butler (Note: Pierce Butler of South Carolina was generally a nationalist, representing up-country interests against the state-dominating big plantations, but on this, he switched between Resolution 7 and Resolution 8, speaking with the small-states, supporting a two- or three-person 'presidency'. Cromwell had started well enough, but his Interregnum turned out badly.) (SC) all objected, preferring two or three persons in the executive, as the ancient Roman Republic had when appointing consuls.

Nathaniel Gorham was Chair of the Committee of the Whole, so Washington sat in the Virginia delegation where everyone could see how he voted. The vote for a one-man 'presidency' carried 7-for, 3-against, New York, Delaware and Maryland in the negative. Virginia, along with George Washington, had voted yes. As of that vote for a single 'presidency', George Mason (VA) gravely announced to the floor, that as of that moment, the Confederation's federal government was "in some measure dissolved by the meeting of this Convention."

First national court(s)

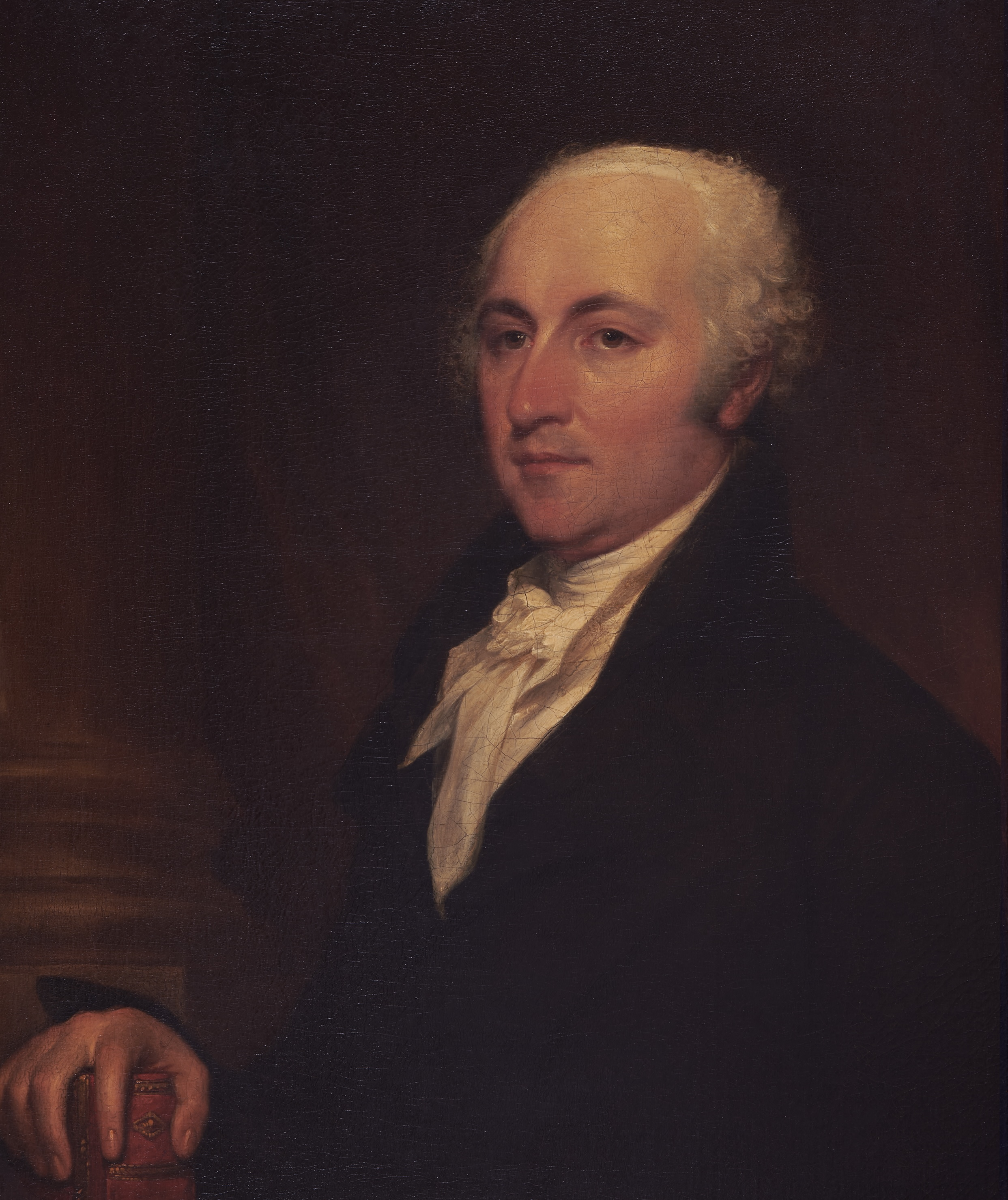
Rufus King, MA
district courts = flexibility

The convention was following the Randolph Plan for an agenda, taking each resolve in turn to move proceedings forward. They returned to items when overnight coalitions required adjustment to previous votes to secure a majority on the next item of business. June 19, and it was Randolph's Ninth Resolve next, about the national court system. On the table was the nationalist proposal for the inferior (lower) courts in the national judiciary.

Pure 1776 republicanism had not given much credit to judges, who would set themselves up apart from and sometimes contradicting the state legislature, the voice of the sovereign people. Under the precedent of English Common Law according to William Blackstone, the legislature, following proper procedure, was for all constitutional purposes, "the people." This dismissal of unelected officers sometimes took an unintended turn among the people. One of John Adams's clients believed the First Continental Congress in 1775 had assumed the sovereignty of Parliament, and so abolished all previously established courts in Massachusetts.

In the convention, looking at a national system, Judge Wilson (PA) sought appointments by a single person to avoid legislative payoffs. Judge Rutledge (SC) was against anything but one national court, a Supreme Court to receive appeals from the highest state courts, like the South Carolina court he presided over as chancellor. Rufus King (MA) thought national district courts in each state would cost less than appeals that otherwise would go to the 'supreme court' in the national capital. National inferior courts passed but making appointments by 'congress' was crossed out and left blank so the delegates could take it up later after "maturer reflection."

=== Reallocating power ===
The Constitutional Convention created a new, unprecedented form of government by reallocating powers of government. Every previous national authority had been either a centralized government, or a "confederation of sovereign constituent states." The American power-sharing was unique at the time. The sources and changes of power were up to the states. The foundations of government and extent of power came from both national and state sources. But the new government would have a national operation. To meet their goals of cementing the Union and securing citizen rights, Framers allocated power among executive, senate, house and judiciary of the central government. But each state government in their variety continued exercising powers in their own sphere.

==== Increase Congress ====
The Convention did not start with national powers from scratch, it began with the powers already vested in the Congress of the Confederation with control of the military, international relations and commerce. (Note: The Articles of Confederation gave Congress control of (1) the military: appoint and commission officers, build a navy, regulate uniform justice, and use privateers. (2) international relations: declare war and make peace, exchange ambassadors, enter treaties and alliances, establish admiralty courts, punish crimes on the high seas and regulate captures, and manage trade and affairs with non-state Indians. (3) commerce: value of coin, uniform standards of weights and measures, post offices, borrow money and establish courts to adjudicate issues between states.) The Constitution added ten more. Five were minor relative to power sharing, including business and manufacturing protections. (Note: McDonald lists his five "minor powers" as governing the federal district, punishing crimes against the law of nations, copyrights and patents, bankruptcies and counterfeiting.) One important new power authorized Congress to protect states from the "domestic violence" of riot and civil disorder, but it was conditioned by a state request.

The Constitution increased Congressional power to organize, arm and discipline the state militias, to use them to enforce the laws of Congress, suppress rebellions within the states and repel invasions. But the Second Amendment would ensure that Congressional power could not be used to disarm state militias.

Taxation substantially increased the power of Congress relative to the states. It was limited by restrictions, forbidding taxes on exports, per capita taxes, requiring import duties to be uniform and that taxes be applied to paying U.S. debt. But the states were stripped of their ability to levy taxes on imports, which was at the time, "by far the most bountiful source of tax revenues".

Congress had no further restrictions relating to political economy. It could institute protective tariffs, for instance. Congress overshadowed state power regulating interstate commerce; the United States would be the "largest area of free trade in the world." The most undefined grant of power was the power to "make laws which shall be necessary and proper for carrying into execution" the Constitution's enumerated powers.

==== Limit governments ====
As of ratification, sovereignty was no longer to be theoretically indivisible. With a wide variety of specific powers among different branches of national governments and thirteen republican state governments, now "each of the portions of powers delegated to the one or to the other ... is ... sovereign with regard to its proper objects". There were some powers that remained beyond the reach of both national powers and state powers, (Note: States would lose more powers with the addition of Constitutional Amendments, the 14th will extend national Bill of Rights freedoms to states, the 15th and 19th will enlarge state citizenship, and the 18th will strip state legislatures of U.S. Senator election.) so the logical seat of American "sovereignty" belonged directly with the people-voters of each state.

Besides expanding Congressional power, the Constitution limited states and central government. Six limits on the national government addressed property rights such as slavery and taxes. (Note: Property right provisions included prohibiting restrictions on slavery within the country until 1808; banning export duties, direct taxes, and port preference; taxing interstate commerce, and confiscating estates.) Six protected liberty such as prohibiting ex post facto laws and no religious tests for national offices in any state, even if they had them for state offices. (Note: Guarantees for liberty in the original Constitution included prohibiting suspension of the writ of habeas corpus except in times of rebellion or invasion, prohibiting ex post facto laws and bills of attainder, providing for impeachment of all civil officers, Jury trial in criminal cases, narrowing the definition of treason by direct action and two witnesses, and forbidding religious qualifications for national office.) Five were principles of a republic, as in legislative appropriation. (Note: In a republic, theory proposed that the people's agent (represented by the House of Representatives) would originate money bills. No money could be spent but by legislative appropriation. Military appropriations were limited to two-years duration. There could be no dual office-holding in the national government and no titles of nobility.) These restrictions lacked systematic organization, but all constitutional prohibitions were practices that the British Parliament had "legitimately taken in the absence of a specific denial of the authority."

The regulation of state power presented a "qualitatively different" undertaking. In the state constitutions, the people did not enumerate powers. They gave their representatives every right and authority not explicitly reserved to themselves. The Constitution extended the limits that the states had previously imposed upon themselves under the Articles of Confederation, forbidding taxes on imports and disallowing treaties among themselves, for example. (Note: The Articles prohibited each state from treating with foreign governments, exchanging ambassadors, grant titles of nobility, maintaining their own armies or ships of war or privateers, they were not to engage in war unless invaded, lay taxes on imports. The states under the Articles of Confederation were not to make treaties among themselves.)

In light of the repeated abuses by ex post facto laws passed by the state legislatures, 1783–1787, the Constitution prohibited ex post facto laws and bills of attainder to protect United States citizen property rights and right to a fair trial. Congressional power of the purse was protected by forbidding taxes or restraint on interstate commerce and foreign trade. States could make no law "impairing the obligation of contracts." (Note: This was necessary since Blackstone held the British Parliament was restrained from ex post facto laws only in criminal matters.) To check future state abuses the framers searched for a way to review and veto state laws harming the national welfare or citizen rights. They rejected proposals for Congressional veto of state laws and gave the Supreme Court appellate case jurisdiction over state law because the Constitution is the supreme law of the land. The United States had such a geographical extent that it could only be safely governed using a combination of republics. Federal judicial districts would follow those state lines.

==== Population power ====
The British had relied upon a concept of "virtual representation" to give legitimacy to their House of Commons. According to many in Parliament, it was not necessary to elect anyone from a large port city, or the American colonies, because the representatives of "rotten boroughs", mostly abandoned medieval fair towns with twenty voters, "virtually represented" them. Philadelphia in the colonies was second in population only to London.

"They were all Englishmen, supposed to be a single people, with one definable interest. Legitimacy came from membership in Parliament of the sovereign realm, not elections from people. As Blackstone explained, the Member is "not bound ... to consult with, or take the advice, of his constituents." As Constitutional historian Gordon Wood elaborated, "The Commons of England contained all of the people's power and were considered to be the very persons of the people they represented."

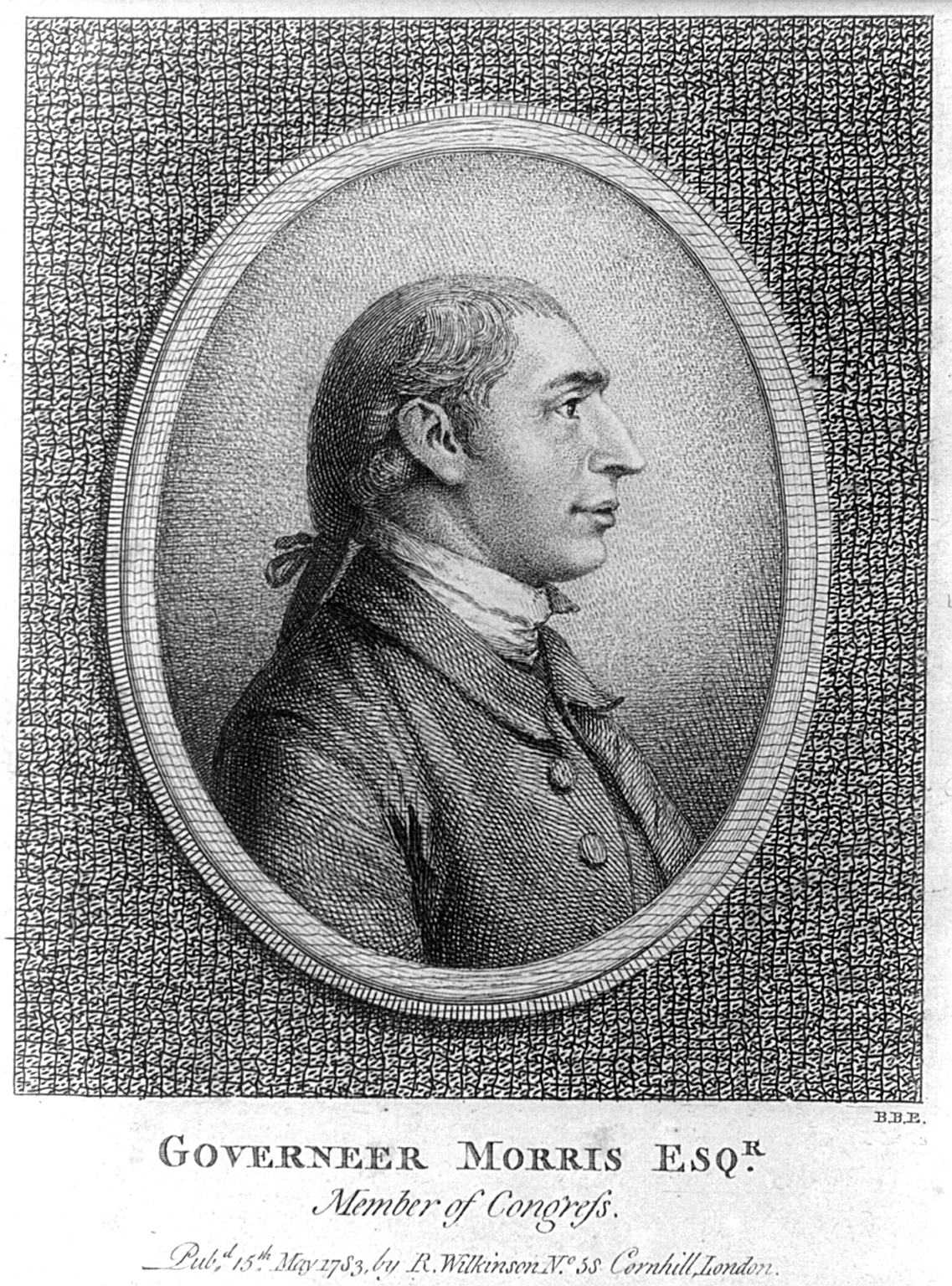
G. Morris, PA
provinces forever

While the English "virtual representation" was hardening into a theory of parliamentary sovereignty, the American theory of representation was moving towards a theory of sovereignty of the people. In their new constitutions written since 1776, Americans required community residency of voters and representatives, expanded suffrage, and equalized populations in voting districts. There was a sense that representation "had to be proportioned to the population." The convention would apply the new principle of "sovereignty of the people" both to the House of Representatives, and to the United States Senate.

===== House changes =====
Once the Great Compromise was reached, delegates in Convention then agreed to a decennial census to count the population. The Americans themselves did not allow for universal suffrage for all adults. (Note: But because the 18th Century Founders did not choose universal suffrage for representatives or for direct proposition referendums does not mean that they did not have to argue the point down and outvote their opponents. In a letter to James Sullivan, May 26, 1776, John Adams asked rhetorically, "Shall we say, that every member of the community, old and young, male and female, as well as rich and poor, must consent, expressly, to every act of legislation?" His answer was, for 1776, No.) Their sort of "virtual representation" said that those voting in a community could understand and themselves represent non-voters when they had like interests that were unlike other political communities. There were enough differences among people in different American communities for those differences to have a meaningful social and economic reality. Thus New England colonial legislatures would not tax communities which had not yet elected representatives. When the royal governor of Georgia refused to allow representation to be seated from four new counties, the legislature refused to tax them.

The 1776 Americans had begun to demand expansion of the franchise, and in each step, they found themselves pressing towards a philosophical "actuality of consent." The Convention determined that the power of the people, should be felt in the House of Representatives. For the U.S. Congress, persons alone were counted. Property was not counted.

===== Senate changes =====
The Convention found it more difficult to give expression to the will of the people in new states. What state might be "lawfully arising" outside the boundaries of the existing thirteen states? The new government was like the old, to be made up of pre-existing states. Now there was to be admission of new states. Regular order would provide new states by state legislatures for Kentucky, Tennessee and Maine. But the Congress of the Confederation had by its Northwest Ordinance presented the convention with a new issue. Settlers in the Northwest Territory might one day constitute themselves into "no more than five" states. More difficult still, most delegates anticipated adding alien peoples of Canada, Louisiana and Florida to United States territory. Generally in American history, European citizens of empire were given U.S. citizenship on territorial acquisition. Should they become states?

Some delegates were reluctant to expand into any so "remote wilderness". It would retard the commercial development of the east. They would be easily influenced, "foreign gold" would corrupt them. Western peoples were the least desirable Americans, only good for perpetual provinces. There were so many foreigners moving out west, there was no telling how things would turn out. These were poor people, they could not pay their fair share of taxes. It would be "suicide" for the original states. New states could become a majority in the Senate, they would abuse their power, "enslaving" the original thirteen. If they also loved liberty, and could not tolerate eastern state dominance, they would be justified in civil war. Western trade interests could drag the country into an inevitable war with Spain for the Mississippi River. As time wore on, any war for the Mississippi River was obviated by the 1803 Louisiana Purchase and the 1812 American victory at New Orleans.

Even if there were to be western states, a House representation of 40,000 might be too small, too easy for the westerners. "States" had been declared out west already. They called themselves republics, and set up their own courts directly from the people without colonial charters. In Transylvania, Westsylvania, Franklin, and Vandalia, "legislatures" met with emissaries from British and Spanish empires in violation of the Articles of Confederation, just as the sovereign states had done. (Note: This point was the principal reason for Maryland's reluctance to ratify the Articles in the first place, delaying its unanimous adoption from 1777 to 1783. Luther Martin (MD) stopped any spontaneously arising western claim of independent statehood by ensuring that the United States owned all the backlands ceded by the states.) In the Constitution as written, no majorities in Congress could break up the larger states without their consent.

"New state" advocates had no fear of western states achieving a majority one day. For example, the British sought to curb American expansion, which caused the angered colonists to agitate for independence. Follow the same rule, get the same results. Congress has never been able to discover a better rule than majority rule. If they grow, let them rule. As they grow, they must get all their supplies from eastern businesses. Character is not determined by points of a compass. States admitted are equals, they will be made up of our brethren. Commit to right principles, even if the right way, one day, benefits other states. They will be free like ourselves, their pride will not allow anything but equality.

It was at this time in the Convention that Reverend Manasseh Cutler arrived to lobby for western land sales. He brought acres of land grants to parcel out. Their sales would fund most of the U.S. government expenditures for its first few decades. There were allocations for the Ohio Company stockholders at the convention, and for others delegates too. Good to his word, in December 1787, Cutler led a small band of pioneers into the Ohio Valley.

The provision for admitting new states became relevant at the purchase of the Louisiana Territory from France. It was constitutionally justifiable under the "treaty making" power of the federal government. The agrarian advocates sought to make the purchase of land that had never been administered, conquered, or formally ceded to any of the original thirteen states. Jefferson's Democratic-Republicans would divide the Louisiana Purchase into states, speeding land sales to finance the federal government with no new taxes. The new populations of new states would swamp the commercial states in the Senate. They would populate the House with egalitarian Democrat-Republicans to overthrow the Federalist Party. (Note: Federalists ruled the first twelve years of government with a President by Washington and Adams. The Democratic-Republicans ruled for the next twenty-four, and arguably after one-term John Quincy Adams, for another thirty years under the Jacksonian Democrats.) Jefferson dropped the proposal of Constitutional amendment to permit the purchase, and with it, his notion of a confederation of sovereign states.

=== Final document ===
After nearly four months of debate, on September 8, 1787, the final text of the Constitution was set down and revised. Then, an official copy of the document was engrossed by Jacob Shallus. The effort consisted of copying the text (prelude, articles and endorsement) on four sheets of vellum parchment, made from treated animal skin and measuring approximately 28 inches (71 cm) by 23 inches (58 cm), probably with a goose quill. Shallus engrossed the entire document except for the list of states at the end of the document, which are in Alexander Hamilton's handwriting. On September 17, 1787, following a speech given by Benjamin Franklin, 39 delegates endorsed and submitted the Constitution to the Congress of the Confederation.

== Ratification of the Constitution ==
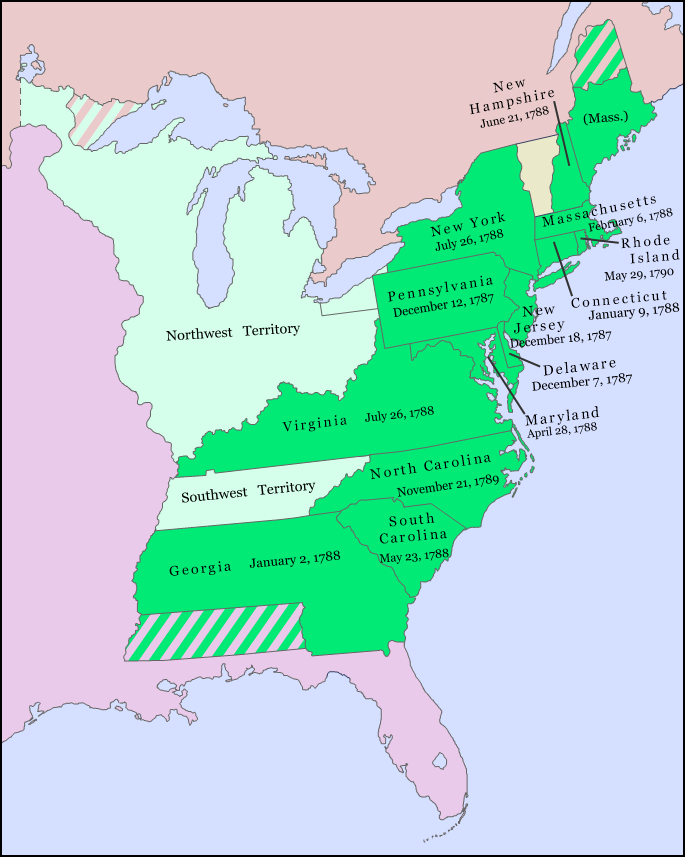
Dates of ratification of the Constitution by the 13 states

Massachusetts' Rufus King assessed the convention as a creature of the states, independent of the Congress of the Confederation, submitting its proposal to that Congress only to satisfy forms. Though amendments were debated, they were all defeated. On September 28, 1787, the Congress of the Confederation resolved "unanimously" to transmit the Constitution to state legislatures for submitting to a ratification convention according to the Constitutional procedure. Several states enlarged the numbers qualified just for electing ratification delegates. In doing so, they went beyond the Constitution's provision for the most voters for the state legislature. (Note: Connecticut expanded electorate to add all town meeting voters; New Hampshire dropped certain property requirements, and added town delegates; Rhode Island put the question to a referendum which rejected the ratification convention, the Federalist minority centered in Newport and Providence boycotted the election; Virginia dropped "legal and Constitutional requirements" to expand the freehold electorate; New York dropped property requirements, timed assembly elections at the same time, and allowed up to five sequential days of voting until the voting rolls were "complete".)

Delaware, on December 7, 1787, became the first State to ratify the new Constitution, with its vote being unanimous. Pennsylvania ratified on December 12, 1787, by a vote of 46 to 23 (66.67%). New Jersey ratified on December 19, 1787, and Georgia on January 2, 1788, both unanimously. Connecticut ratified on January 8, 1788. Massachusetts on February 6, 1788. Maryland on April 28, 1788. South Carolina on May 23, 1788. The requirement of ratification by nine states, set by Article Seven of the Constitution, was met when New Hampshire voted to ratify, on June 21, 1788.

In New York, fully two thirds of the convention delegates were at first opposed to the Constitution. Hamilton led the Federalist campaign, which included the fast-paced appearance of The Federalist Papers in New York newspapers. An attempt to attach conditions to ratification almost succeeded, but on July 26, 1788, New York ratified, with a recommendation that a bill of rights be appended. The vote was close – yeas 30 (52.6%), nays 27 – due largely to Hamilton's forensic abilities and his reaching a few key compromises with moderate anti-Federalists led by Melancton Smith. (Note: Opposition to ratification was led by Governor George Clinton; the opposition also suggested that New York reserve the right to withdraw if the Constitution were not amended. Madison led the first session of the first Congress to propose amendments, and ten of the twelve were made Constitutional.)

Following Massachusetts's lead, the Federalist minorities in both Virginia and New York were able to obtain ratification in convention by linking ratification to recommended amendments. A minority of the Constitution's critics continued to oppose the Constitution. Maryland's Luther Martin argued that the federal convention had exceeded its authority; he still called for amending the Articles. Article 13 of the Articles of Confederation stated that the union created under the Articles was "perpetual" and that any alteration must be "agreed to in a Congress of the United States, and be afterwards confirmed by the legislatures of every State".

However, the unanimity required under the Articles made all attempts at reform impossible. Martin's allies such as New York's John Lansing Jr., dropped moves to obstruct the convention's process. They began to take exception to the Constitution "as it was", seeking amendments. Several conventions saw supporters for "amendments before" shift to a position of "amendments after" for the sake of staying in the Union. New York Anti's "circular letter" was sent to each state legislature on 26 July 1788 (the same date on which that state's legislature voted to ratify the Constitution) proposing a second constitutional convention for "amendments before". It failed in the state legislatures. Ultimately only North Carolina and Rhode Island would wait for amendments from Congress before ratifying.

The Constitution was ratified by the states in the following order:
#	Date	State	Votes	
#	Date	State	Yea	Nay
1	December 7, 1787	Delaware	30	0
2	December 12, 1787	Pennsylvania	46	23
3	December 18, 1787	New Jersey	38	0
4	January 2, 1788	Georgia	26	0
5	January 9, 1788	Connecticut	128	40
6	February 6, 1788	Massachusetts	187	168
7	April 28, 1788	Maryland	63	11
8	May 23, 1788	South Carolina	149	73
9	June 21, 1788	New Hampshire	57	47
10	June 25, 1788	Virginia	89	79
11	July 26, 1788	New York	30	27
12	November 21, 1789	North Carolina	194	77
13	May 29, 1790	Rhode Island	34	32

Article VII of the proposed constitution stipulated that only nine of the thirteen states would have to ratify for the new government to go into effect for the participating states. By the end of July 1788, eleven states had ratified the Constitution, and soon thereafter, the process of organizing the new government began. On September 13, 1788, the Congress of the Confederation certified that the new Constitution had been ratified by more than enough states for it to go into effect. Congress fixed the city of New York as the temporary seat of the new government and set the dates for the election of representatives and presidential electors. It also set the date for operations to begin under the new government. This occurred on March 4, 1789, when the First Congress convened.

The membership of the new Congress was decidedly federalist. In the eleven-state (minus North Carolina and Rhode Island) Senate 20 were Federalist and two Anti-federalist (both from Virginia). The House included 48 Federalists and 11 Anti-federalists (from four states: Massachusetts, New York, South Carolina, and Virginia). On April 6 the House and Senate held a joint meeting to count the electoral vote. George Washington was unanimously elected the first president, even receiving the electoral vote of ardent anti-federalist Patrick Henry. John Adams of Massachusetts was elected vice president. Both were sworn into office on April 30, 1789.

Anti-Federalists' fears of personal oppression by Congress were allayed by twelve amendments passed under the floor leadership of James Madison during the first session of Congress. The ten of these that were ratified by the required number of state legislatures became known as the Bill of Rights. Objections to a potentially remote federal judiciary were reconciled with 13 federal courts (11 states, plus Maine and Kentucky), and three federal riding circuits out of the Supreme Court: Eastern, Middle and South. Suspicion of a powerful federal executive was answered by Washington's cabinet appointments of once-Anti-Federalists Edmund Jennings Randolph as Attorney General and Thomas Jefferson as Secretary of State. What Constitutional historian Pauline Maier termed a national "dialogue between power and liberty" had begun anew.

== Amendments to the Constitution ==
Since the beginning of federal operations under the Constitution in 1789 through the beginning of 2013, approximately 11,539 proposals to amend the Constitution have been introduced in the United States Congress. Of these, thirty-three have been approved by Congress and sent to the states for ratification. Twenty-seven of these amendments have been ratified and are now part of the Constitution. The first ten amendments were adopted and ratified simultaneously and are known collectively as the Bill of Rights. Prior to the Twenty-seventh Amendment, which languished for 202 years, 7 months, 12 days before being ratified (submitted for ratification in 1789 as part of the Bill of Rights, but not ratified until 1992), the Twenty-second Amendment held the record for longest time taken to successfully complete the ratification process – 3 years, 11 months, 6 days. The Twenty-sixth Amendment holds the record for shortest time taken – 3 months, 8 days. Six amendments adopted by Congress and sent to the states have not been ratified by the required number of states and are not part of the Constitution. Four of these are still technically open and pending, one is closed and has failed by its own terms, and one is closed and has failed by the terms of the resolution proposing it.

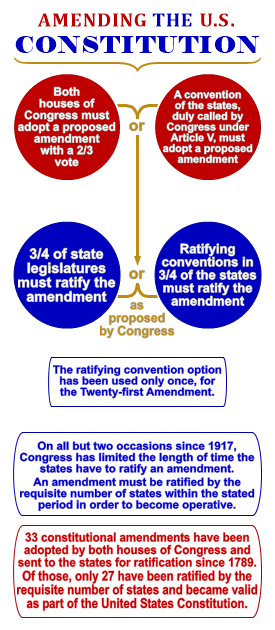
The U.S. constitutional amendment process

=== Bill of Rights ===
Much of opposition to the proposed Constitution within several states arose, not because the machinery of the new frame of government was considered unworkable or because strengthening the union between the 13 states viewed as undesirable. The debates in the state ratifying conventions centered around the absence of anything equivalent to the bill of rights found in several state constitutions. George Mason, a delegate to the 1787 Constitutional Convention, and the author of the Virginia Declaration of Rights, refused to sign the document because he felt it did not specifically spell out or protect individual rights sufficiently. He also opposed the Constitution when it was brought before the state for ratification. He acquiesced and the convention voted narrowly to give its assent only after it was decided that a list of twenty proposed amendments be sent along with the state's resolution of ratification. Delegates to Massachusetts' convention had many of the same concerns, and along with its notification of approval made a request for nine alterations, the first among them being "that it be explicitly declared that all powers not specifically delegated to Congress by the Constitution are reserved to the states to be exercised by them." New York, not to be outdone, appended a list of thirty-two requested amendments plus a lengthy statement of impressions and explanations about the new Constitution to their affirmative vote.

The sharp Anti-Federalist critique of the Constitution did not abate after it became operational, and by the time the First Congress convened in March 1789, there existed widespread sentiment in both the House and Senate in favor of making alterations. That September, Congress adopted twelve amendments and sent to the states for ratification. Ten of these were ratified by the required number of states in December 1791 and became part of the Constitution. These amendments enumerate freedoms not explicitly indicated in the main body of the Constitution, such as freedom of religion, freedom of speech, a free press, and free assembly; the right to keep and bear arms; freedom from unreasonable search and seizure, security in personal effects, and freedom from warrants issued without probable cause; indictment by a grand jury for a capital or "infamous crime"; guarantee of a speedy, public trial with an impartial jury; and prohibition of double jeopardy. In addition, the Bill of Rights reserves for the people any rights not specifically mentioned in the Constitution and reserves all powers not specifically granted to the federal government to the people or the States.

=== Subsequent amendments ===
Amendments to the Constitution subsequent to the Bill of Rights cover a wide range of subjects. Several have added significant content to the original document. One of the most far-reaching is the Fourteenth, ratified in 1868, which establishes a clear and simple definition of citizenship and guarantees equal treatment under the law. Also significant are the Fifteenth, Nineteenth, Twenty-fourth, and Twenty-sixth, which were enacted to extend the right to vote to persons previously considered ineligible and also to protect their exercise of that right. One Amendment, the Eighteenth, which criminalized the production, transport and sale of alcohol nationwide, was later repealed by another, the Twenty-first. Nine ratified amendments (11, 12, 13, 14, 16, 17, 20, 22, and 25) have explicitly superseded or modified the text of the original Constitution.

Article 1, Section 2, Clause 3a^{α}	Regarding how the apportionment of representatives and direct taxes among the states is determined.	Superseded by the Fourteenth Amendment, Section 2
Article 1, Section 3, Clause 1	Regarding the senators from each state being chosen by the legislature of that state.	Superseded by the Seventeenth Amendment, Section 1^{β}
Article 1, Section 3, Clause 2	Regarding the filling of vacancies in the senate.	Superseded by the Seventeenth Amendment, Section 2
Article 1, Section 4, Clause 2	Regarding when each year the Congress must assemble.	Modified by the Twentieth Amendment, Section 2
Article 1, Section 9, Clause 4	Regarding Congress' restricted taxation power.	Superseded by the Sixteenth Amendment
Article 2, Section 1, Clause 1b	Regarding the length of the president's and vice president's term of office.	Temporarily modified^{γ} by the Twentieth Amendment, Section 1
Article 2, Section 1, Clause 3	Regarding Electoral College voting procedures.	Superseded by the Twelfth Amendment^{δ}
Article 2, Section 1, Clause 5	Regarding eligibility for holding the office of president.	Modified by the Twenty-second Amendment, Section 1
Article 2, Section 1, Clause 6	Regarding presidential powers and duties if the presidency is vacant or if the President is unable to discharge said powers and duties.	Superseded by the Twenty-fifth Amendment
Article 3, Section 2, Clause 1	Regarding the diversity jurisdiction given to the judiciary to hear cases between a state and citizens of another state.	Modified by the Eleventh Amendment
Article 4, Section 2, Clause 3	Regarding persons held (involuntarily) to service or labor.	Superseded by the Thirteenth Amendment, Section 1
α – In 1865, the Thirteenth Amendment rendered the formula prescribed in Article 1, Section 2, Clause 3, whereby only three-fifths of all other Persons (slaves) were counted when determining a state's total population for apportionment purposes, moot de jure. Three years later, the entire first sentence of the clause was superseded by the Fourteenth Amendment, Section 2. This later amendment however, left Congress' taxation power unchanged, as the replacement clause in it made no mention of apportionment of direct taxes. Even so, Congress' ability to levy taxes was still governed by Article 1 Section 9 Clause 4 of the Constitution.
β – Section 1 of the Seventeenth Amendment, regarding the six-year term of office for senators, was shortened for those persons whose term as senator ended on March 4, 1935, 1937, and 1939, by the interval between January 3 and March 4, of that year (61 days) by the Twentieth Amendment, which became part of the Constitution on January 23, 1933, and the changes made by Section 1 took effect on October 15, 1933. This amendment also had a de facto effect on Article 1, Section 2, Clause 1a, for although the election was held as prescribed, the term of office for the persons elected to Congress in November 1932, was in effect shortened by the same interval of days.
γ – The term of office for the persons elected president and Vice President (Franklin D. Roosevelt and John Nance Garner respectively) in November 1932, was shortened by the interval between January 20 and March 4, 1937 (44 days), by the Twentieth Amendment.
δ – The fourth sentence of the Twelfth Amendment, regarding the vice president acting as president if the House, when the choice is theirs to make, has not elected a president by March 4, has been superseded by the Twentieth Amendment, Section 3.

== Criticism of the Constitution ==
=== Expand democracy ===
In the early twentieth century Lochner era, the Supreme Court ruled unconstitutional various state laws that limited labor contracts. The Constitution was criticized as putting the government at the beck and call of big business.

More recent criticism has often been academic and limited to particular features. University of Texas law professor Sanford Levinson wonders whether it makes sense for the Connecticut Compromise to give "Wyoming the same number of votes as California, which has roughly seventy times the population". Levinson thinks this imbalance causes a "steady redistribution of resources from large states to small states." Levinson is critical of the Electoral College as it allows the possibility of electing presidents who do not win the majority, or even plurality, of votes. Five times in American history, presidents have been elected despite failing to win a plurality of the popular vote: 1824 (John Quincy Adams), 1876 (Rutherford B. Hayes), 1888 (Benjamin Harrison), 2000 (George W. Bush) and 2016 (Donald Trump). The current impeachment powers do not give the people a quick way to remove incompetent or ill presidents, in his view. Others have criticized gerrymandering.

Yale professor Robert A. Dahl saw a problem with an American tendency towards worship of the Constitution itself. He sees aspects of American governance which are "unusual and potentially undemocratic: the federal system, the bicameral legislature, judicial review, presidentialism, and the electoral college system." Levinson and Labunski and others have called for a Second Constitutional Convention, although professors like Dahl believe there is no real hope this would ever happen. French journalist Jean-Philippe Immarigeon wrote in Harper's that the "nearly 230-year-old constitution stretched past the limits of its usefulness", and suggested key problem points were the inability to call an election when government became gridlocked, a several month period between the election and when the president takes office, and inability of the lower house of Congress to influence serious foreign policy decisions such as ending a war when faced with a veto.

University of Virginia professor Larry Sabato advocates an amendment to organize presidential primaries. Sabato details more objections in his book A More Perfect Constitution. He opposes life tenure for Federal Court judges, including Supreme Court justices. He also writes that "If the 26 least populated states voted as a bloc, they would control the U.S. Senate with a total of just under 17% of the country's population." Sabato further contends that the Constitution is in need of an overhaul, and argues that only a national constitutional convention can bring the document up to date and settle many of the issues that have arisen over the past two centuries.

=== States' rights ===
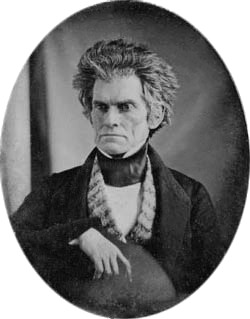
John C. Calhoun

In United States history, four periods of widespread Constitutional criticism have been characterized by the idea that specific political powers belong to state governments and not to the federal government—a doctrine commonly known as states' rights. At each stage, states' rights advocates failed to develop a preponderance in public opinion or to sustain the democratic political will required to alter the generally held constitutional understanding and political practice in the United States. At its adoption among the people in the state ratification conventions, the "men of original principles" opposed the new national government as violating the Whig philosophy generally accepted among the original thirteen colonies in 1776. According to this view, Congress as a legislature should be only equal to any state legislature, and only the people in each state might be sovereign. They are now referred to as the Anti-Federalists in American historiography. The proponents of "state sovereignty" and "states rights" were outvoted in eleven of thirteen state ratification conventions, then thirteen of thirteen, to "ordain and establish" the Constitution.

During Andrew Jackson's administration, South Carolina objected to U.S. government's "tariff of abominations" collected as federal duties in Charleston Harbor. The Nullification Crisis ensued. Justification for the nullifiers was found in the U.S. Senate speeches and writings of John C. Calhoun. He defended slavery against the Constitutional provisions allowing its statutory regulation or its eventual abolition by Constitutional amendment, most notably in his Disquisition on Government. The crisis was averted when President Jackson, a former Major General, declared he would march a U.S. army into South Carolina and hang the first nullifier he saw from the first tree, and a new negotiated tariff, the Compromise Tariff of 1833, satisfactory to South Carolina was enacted. Despite this, a states-rights-based defense of slavery persisted amongst Southerners until the American Civil War; conversely, Northerners explored nullification of the Fugitive Slave Act of 1850. Abraham Lincoln kept a portrait of Andrew Jackson above his desk at the U.S. War Department for the duration of the American Civil War as a clear symbol of Lincoln's intent and resolve as well as to draw attention to an executive precedent for Lincoln's actions.

In the mid-19th Century during the administrations of Abraham Lincoln, Andrew Johnson and Ulysses S. Grant, the United States suffered a tragic passage through the Civil War and Reconstruction. An important survey of the philosophical and legal underpinnings of "States Rights" as held by secessionists and Lost Cause advocates afterwards is found in the speeches of Confederate President Jefferson Davis and his Rise and Fall of the Confederate Government. Davis defended secession by appealing to the "original principles" of the Founders' 1776 Revolutionary generation, and by expanding on William Blackstone's doctrine of legislative supremacy. By the elections of 1872, all states which had been admitted to the United States in accordance with the Constitution were fully represented in the U.S. Congress.

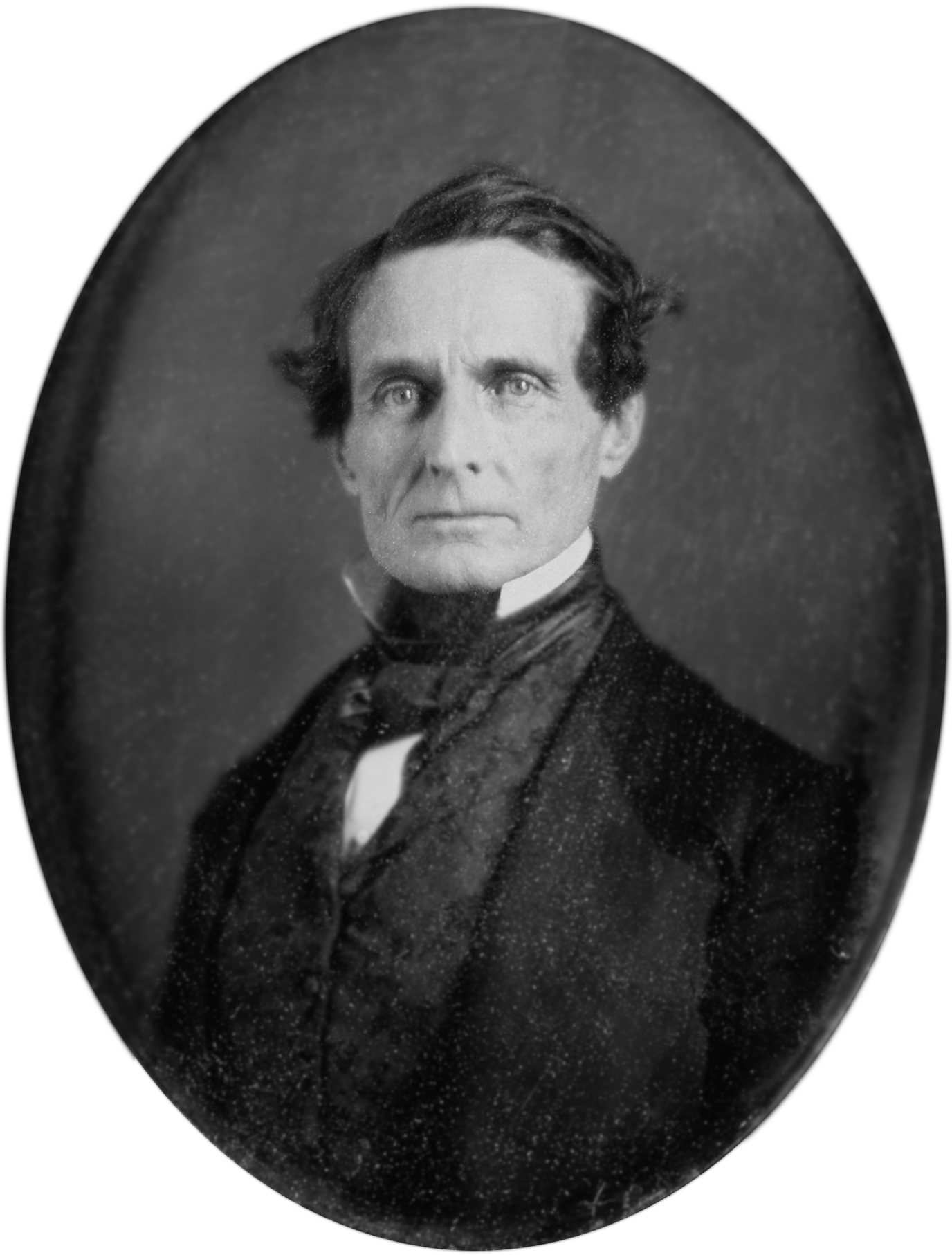
Jefferson Davis

Following the Supreme Court 1954 holding in Brown v. Board of Education, President Dwight D. Eisenhower used National Guard and U.S. paratroopers to enforce the rulings of the Federal Courts as they pertained to the Constitution. The "States Rights" doctrine was again appealed to during the mid-20th Century resistance to racial integration in the schools, notably in Arkansas' Little Rock Nine, Alabama's Stand in the Schoolhouse Door, and Virginia's Massive Resistance. Public schools in every state are now racially integrated by law under the authority of the U.S. Constitution.

The tradition is seen in many shorter episodes of limited minority protest against the United States. During the War of 1812, Federalists conducted a Hartford Convention proposing New England secession during wartime to reopen trade with the declared enemy of the United States. It led to accusations of treason and the demise of the Federalist Party as a force in American politics. In 1921, the Maryland Attorney General sued to block woman suffrage. He argued in Leser v. Garnett that state legislatures were Constitutionally the sole determiners of who should vote in what federal or state elections, and that the 19th Amendment was improper. The Supreme Court's judicial review of the state court findings held that the 19th Amendment was Constitutional, and that it applied to the women's right to vote in every state. Women now vote in every state under the authority of the U.S. Constitution.

One exceptional example of "states rights" persuading overwhelming majorities in a democratic and sustained way, and so transforming the nation came in the John Adams administration. Fear had spread that radical democratic sentiment might turn subversive as it had in the French Reign of Terror. But the Federalist-sponsored Alien and Sedition Acts meant to preempt the danger led to suppression of opposition press. The political reaction in the Virginia and Kentucky Resolutions sparked public opposition against the Federalist policy and led to twenty-four years of Constitutionally elected Democratic-Republican Party rule through six administrations of Thomas Jefferson, James Madison and James Monroe.

In the late 20th and early 21st centuries, opponents of federal laws prohibiting the sale and possession of marijuana have based their objections partially on states' rights grounds, as have opponents of federal laws and regulations pertaining to firearms. States' rights under the constitution has also been recently raised as an issue on a number of other occasions, most notably regarding Common Core, the Affordable Care Act, and same-sex marriage.

== History of the physical document ==
At first, little interest was shown in the parchment object itself. Madison had custody of it as Secretary of State (1801–1809) but having left Washington, he had lost track of it in the years leading to his death. A publisher had access to it in 1846 for a book on the Constitution. In 1883 historian J. Franklin Jameson found the parchment folded in a small tin box on the floor of a closet at the State, War and Navy Building. In 1894 the State Department sealed the Declaration and Constitution between two glass plates and kept them in a safe.

The two parchment documents were turned over to the Library of Congress by executive order, and in 1924 President Calvin Coolidge dedicated the bronze-and-marble shrine for public display of the Constitution in the main building. The parchments were laid over moisture absorbing cellulose paper, vacuum-sealed between double panes of insulated plate glass, and protected from light by a gelatin film. Although building construction of the Archives Building was completed in 1935, in December 1941 they were moved from the Library of Congress until September 1944, and stored at the U.S. Bullion Depository, Fort Knox, Kentucky, along with the Declaration of Independence and the Gettysburg Address. In 1951 following a study by the National Bureau of Standards to protect from atmosphere, insects, mold and light, the parchments were re-encased with special light filters, inert helium gas and proper humidity. They were transferred to the National Archives and Records Administration in 1952.

Since 1952, the "Charters of Freedom" have been displayed in the Rotunda of the National Archives Building. Visual inspections have been enhanced by electronic imaging. Changes in the cases led to removal from their cases July 2001, preservation treatment by conservators, and installment in new encasements for public display in September 2003.

== See also ==
- Constitution Day and Citizenship Day
- Founding Fathers of the United States
- History of democracy
- History of the Supreme Court of the United States
- Republicanism in the United States
- Second Constitutional Convention of the United States
- United States Constitution and worldwide influence
- Reform of the Senate

== Bibliography ==
=== Primary sources ===
- Bailyn, Bernard, ed. The Debate on the Constitution: Federalist and Antifederalist Speeches, Articles, and Letters During the Struggle for Ratification. Part One: September 1787 to February 1788 (The Library of America, 1993) ISBN 0-940450-42-9
- Bailyn, Bernard, ed. The Debate on the Constitution: Federalist and Antifederalist Speeches, Articles, and Letters During the Struggle for Ratification. Part Two: January to August 1788 (The Library of America, 1993) ISBN 0-940450-64-X
- Max Farrand, ed., The Records of the Federal Convention of 1787 (4 vols., 1911–1937; rev. ed. 1966).
  - Max Farrand (1911). "The Records of the Federal Convention of 1787, 3 vols". Online Library of Liberty.
  - Farrand, Max (January 1, 1911). "The records of the Federal convention of 1787". Yale university press; [etc., etc.] – via HathiTrust.
  - "Internet Archive Search: ((subject:"Farrand, Max" OR subject:"Max Farrand" OR creator:"Farrand, Max" OR creator:"Max Farrand" OR creator:"Farrand, M." OR title:"Max Farrand" OR description:"Farrand, Max" OR description:"Max Farrand") OR ("1869–1945" AND Farrand)) AND (-mediatype:software)". archive.org.
  - "Internet Archive Search: Records Federal Convention 1787". archive.org.
- Madison, James. Jonathan Elliot's Debates in the Several State Conventions on the Adoption of the Federal Constitution. Vol. 3: Debates in the Federal Convention of 1787 as Reported by James Madison. 1989.
- Scott, James Brown, ed. James Madison's notes of debates in the Federal convention of 1787 and their relation to a more perfect society of nations 1918.
  - Scott, James Brown (January 1, 1918). "James Madison's notes of debates in the Federal convention of 1787 and their relation to a more perfect society of nations". New York, Oxford University Press, American branch – via Internet Archive.
  - Scott, James Brown. "1787: Madison's Notes of Debates in the Federal Convention". Online Library of Liberty.
- Martin, Luther. Secret proceedings and debates of the convention assembled at Philadelphia, in the year 1787. 1838.
  - Martin, Luther; Lansing, John; Yates, Robert (January 1, 1838). "Secret proceedings and debates of the convention assembled at Philadelphia, in the year 1787 (from old catalog)". Cincinnati, A. Mygatt – via Internet Archive.
  - Martin, Luther; Lansing, John; Yates, Robert (January 1, 1821). "Secret Proceedings and Debates of the Convention Assembled at Philadelphia..." Printed by Websters and Skinners – via Internet Archive.
  - Martin, Luther; Lansing, John; Yates, Robert (January 1, 1909). "Secret proceedings and debates of the convention assembled at Philadelphia, in the year 1787 : for the purpose of forming the United States of America". Washington : Govt. Print. Off – via Internet Archive.
  - Martin, Luther; Lansing, John; Yates, Robert (January 1, 1844). "Secret proceedings and debates of the convention assembled at Philadelphia, in the year 1787 : for the purpose of forming the Constitution of the United States of America". Louisville, Ky. : A. Mygatt – via Internet Archive.
  - Martin, Luther; Lansing, John; Yates, Robert (January 1, 1838). "Secret proceedings and debates of the convention assembled at Philadelphia, in the 1787,: for the purpose of forming the Constitution of the United States of America". A. Mygatt – via HathiTrust.
  - Martin, Luther; Lansing, John; Yates, Robert (January 1, 1909). "Secret proceedings and debates of the convention assembled at Philadelphia, in the year 1787: for the purpose of forming the United States of America". Govt. Print. Off – via HathiTrust.
  - "United States Constitutional Convention (1787) (United States. Constitutional Convention (1787)) – The Online Books Page". upenn.edu.
- Pole, J. R., ed. The Federalist Indianapolis: Hackett, 2005.

=== Scholarly studies ===
- Adair, Douglass [author]; Colbourn, Trevor [editor]. Fame and the Founding Fathers: Writings of Douglass Adair. W. W. Norton for Institute of Early American History and Culture, 1974; reprint ed., Liberty Fund, 1998. Collection of essays by one of the most influential scholars on the intellectual origins of the Constitution.
- Adams, Willi Paul (1980). The First American Constitutions: Republican Ideology and the Making of the State Constitutions in the Revolutionary Era. Chapel Hill, NC: University of North Carolina Press. ISBN 0-8078-1388-5. Focusing on the state constitutions framed in the era of Revolutionary constitutionalism and their relationship to the Constitution of 1787.
- Berkin, Carol (2002). A Brilliant Solution: Inventing the American Constitution. Orlando, FL: Harcourt. ISBN 0-15-100948-1. Broad and accessible overview.
- Bernstein, Richard B.; with Rice, Kym S. (1987). Are We to Be a Nation? The Making of the Constitution. Cambridge, MA: Harvard University Press. ISBN 978-0674044753. Broad-focus overview, written for scholars and general readers alike, of the "age of experiments in government" spanning the period from the early 1750s through the early 1790s, and giving careful attention to the intellectual context and origins of the Constitution and the Bill of Rights.
- Bernstein, Richard B. (1993). Amending America: If We Love the Constitution So Much, Why Do We Keep Trying to Change It?. Lawrence, KS: University Press of Kansas. ISBN 0-7006-0715-3. History of the Constitution's amending process, focusing on the links between the Constitution and American national identity and values.
- Bowen, Catherine (2010) [First published 1966]. Miracle at Philadelphia: The Story of the Constitutional Convention, May to September 1787. New York: Little, Brown. ISBN 978-0-316-10261-2.
- Collier, Christopher. All Politics Is Local: Family, Friends, and Provincial Interests in the Creation of the Constitution. U. Press of New England, 2003. 224 pp.
- Collier, Christopher and Collier, James Lincoln. Decision in Philadelphia: The Constitutional Convention of 1787. 1986. 331 pp.
- Currie, David P. The Constitution in Congress: Democrats and Whigs, 1829–1861. U. of Chicago Press, 2005. 346 pp.
- Edling, Max. A Revolution in Favor of Government: Origins of the United States Constitution and the Making of the American State, Oxford: Oxford University Press, 2003.
- Jensen, Merrill. The New Nation a History of the United States During the Confederation 1781–1789, 1950.
- Johnson, Allen. Union and Democracy. Houghton Mifflin Company, 1915.
- Kernell, Samuel, ed. James Madison: The Theory and Practice of Republican Government. 2003. 381 pp.
- Klarman, Michael J. (2016). The Framers' Coup: The Making of the United States Constitution. Oxford University Press. ISBN 978-0190865962.
- Kyvig, David. Explicit & Authentic Acts: Amending the U.S. Constitution, 1776–1995. University Press of Kansas, 1996. Bancroft-Prize-winning history of the Constitution's amending process.
- Levinson, Sanford (2006). Our Undemocratic Constitution: Where the Constitution Goes Wrong (and How We the People Can Correct It). Oxford; New York: Oxford University Press. ISBN 0-19-530751-8.
- Levy, Leonard W.; Karst, Kenneth; and Mahoney, Dennis, eds. Encyclopedia of the American Constitution 4 volumes (1986).
- Maier, Pauline (2010). Ratification: The People Debate the Constitution, 1787-1788. New York: Simon & Schuster. ISBN 9780684868547.
- McDonald, Forrest (1979) [1965]. E Pluribus Unum: The Formation of the American Republic, 1776-1790. Indianapolis, IN: Liberty Fund. ISBN 0-9139-6658-4.
- McDonald, Forrest (1985). Novus Ordo Seclorum: The Intellectual Origins of the Constitution. Lawrence, KS: University Press of Kansas. ISBN 978-0-7006-0311-4.
- McDonald, Forrest (1958). We the People: The Economic Origins of the Constitution. Chicago: University of Chicago Press.
- McGuire, Robert A. To Form a More Perfect Union: A New Economic Interpretation of the United States Constitution. 2003. 395 pp.
- Morris, Richard B. (1987). The Forging of the Union. New York: Harper & Row. ISBN 978-0-0609-1424-0. Political and economic survey of 1780s and writing of Constitution.
- Nevins, Allan. The American States During and After the Revolution, 1775–1789. 1924 (ISBN 0-678-00510-9)
- Phillips, Stephen C.; Smith, Alex P.; Licari, Peter R. (2022). "Philadelphia reconsidered: participant curation, the Gerry Committee, and US constitutional design". Public Choice. 190 (3): 407–426. doi:10.1007/s11127-021-00943-5. S2CID 244431495.
- Robertson, David Brian (2005). "Madison's Opponents and Constitutional Design". American Political Science Review. 99 (2): 225–43. doi:10.1017/S0003055405051622. JSTOR 30038934. S2CID 145374045.
- Stewart, David O. (2007). The Summer of 1787: The Men Who Invented the Constitution. New York: Simon and Schuster. ISBN 978-0-7432-8692-3.
- Tasi, Robert L., America's Forgotten Constitutions: Defiant Visions of Power and Community (Cambridge, MA: Harvard University Press, 2014).
- Wood, Gordon S. (1979). The Confederation and the Constitution: The Critical Issues. Washington, DC: University Press of America. ISBN 978-0819-10821-0.
- Wood, Gordon S. (1969). The Creation of the American Republic, 1776-1787. University of North Carolina Press. ISBN 978-0-8078-4723-7.
- Wood, Gordon S. (2011). The Idea of America: Reflections on the Birth of the United States. The Penguin Press. ISBN 978-1-59420-290-2.
- Wood, Gordon S. (1987). The Making of the Constitution. Baylor University Press. ISBN 978-0-9189-54497.
