= Worldwide influence of the Constitution of the United States =

The United States Constitution has had influence internationally on later constitutions and legal thinking. Its influence appears in similarities of phrasing and borrowed passages in other constitutions, as well as in the principles of the rule of law, separation of powers and recognition of individual rights. The American experience of constitutional amendment and judicial review motivated constitutionalists at times when they were considering the possibilities for their nation's future. Examples include Abraham Lincoln during the American Civil War, his contemporary and ally Benito Juárez of Mexico, the second generation of 19th-century constitutional nationalists José Rizal of the Philippines, and Sun Yat-sen of China, and the framers of the Australian constitution. However, democratizing countries often chose more centralized British or French models of government, particularly the British Westminster system. Since the 1980s, the influence of the United States Constitution has been waning as other countries have created new constitutions or updated older constitutions, a process which Sanford Levinson believes to be more difficult in the United States than in any other country.

== National constitutions ==
The historian William H. McNeill argued that the United States saw itself as "one of a family of peoples and nations" making a history apart from the European civilization of their colonization. The United States Constitution is an expression of Americans diverging from colonial rule, according to this viewpoint. Its effect is reflected in the ideals of limiting the rulers of a state apart and above sitting law-givers in a parliament. The concepts of governance influencing others internationally are not only found among similarities in phrasing and entire passages from the U.S. Constitution. They are in the principles of the rule of law and recognition of individual rights.

The American experience of fundamental law with amendments and judicial review has motivated foreign constitutionalists to reconsider possibilities for their own future. This view informed Abraham Lincoln during the American Civil War, (Note: "Secession was indeed unconstitutional...military resistance to secession was not only constitutional but also morally justified. "the primary purpose of the Constitution was … to create a more perfect union’... the Constitution was an exercise in nation-building.) his contemporary and ally Benito Juarez of Mexico, (Note: Juarez regarded the United States as a model of republican democracy and consistently supported Abraham Lincoln.) and the second generation of 19th century constitutional nationalists, José Rizal of the Philippines (Note: The institutions of the two countries which have most influenced constitutional development are Spain and the United States." One of the reforms, "sine quibus non", to use the words of Rizal and Mabini, always insisted upon by the Filipinos, was Philippine representation in the Spanish Cortez, the promulgation in the Islands of the Spanish Constitution, and the complete assimilation equal to that of any in the Spanish provinces on the continent.) and Sun Yat-sen of China. (Note: In the modern history of China, there were many revolutionaries who tried to seek the truth from the West in order to overthrow the feudal system of the Qing dynasty. Sun Yat-sen for example was much influenced by American democracy, especially the U.S. Constitution.)

Generally the influence of the Constitution appears in trans-national history of ideas, foreign translations, and exchanges between Americans and their counterparts from the beginning with smuggled translations into Hispanic America until today with conferences among national legislators. Innovations include constitutional conventions, written constitutions, ratification and amendment procedures. There are common provisions for presidential executives, federalism and judicial review.

American historian George Athan Billias wrote "the influence of American constitutionalism abroad was profound in the past and remains a remarkable contribution to humankind's search for freedom under a system of laws." Billias describes six waves of influence:

1. From 1776 to 1811, after the American Revolution began, it influenced northwestern Europe and its colonial connections.
2. 1811–1848, after the decline of Napoleon's reputation, it was referenced by Latin American, Caribbean, and European nationalists.
3. 1898–1918, after the Spanish–American War, nationalist movements borrowed from the U.S. Constitution in Asia and Latin America.
4. 1918–1945, after World War I, its influence spread with movements for decolonization of Africa, Mid-east and Asia.
5. 1945–1974, after World War II, independence movements consulted it.
6. 1974–1989, after United Nations expansion, once nondemocratic regimes, including European ones, transitioned towards constitutional democracies incorporating elements of the U.S. Constitution.

Over its history, the influence of American constitutionalism has waxed and waned. Internationally it appears that those of Confucian and Islamic cultures do not readily adopt some of its premises.

Democratizing countries often chose the more centralized, consolidated British or French models. Many countries that were once part of the British Empire adopted the British Westminster system (see, for example, Representation of the People Act).

Australian constitutional law was influenced by the US Constitution as well as the Canadian and Swiss constitutions, while at the same time preserving Westminster parliamentary traditions and the British monarchy (see Westminster system § "Washminster system"). It adopted a federal system similar to the US, with a senate that represented the states (direct election to both Houses was a new concept). It also adopted the concepts of a formal separation of power and judicial review but did not adopt guarantees of personal rights into the constitution.

According to a 2012 study by David Law of Washington University in St. Louis published in the New York University Law Review, the influence of the U.S. Constitution may be waning. The study examined more than 700 federal constitutions from nearly 200 countries. "Rather than leading the way for global constitutionalism, the U.S. Constitution appears instead to be losing its appeal as a model for constitutional drafters elsewhere," the researchers write. "The idea of adopting a constitution may still trace its inspiration to the United States, but the manner in which constitutions are written increasingly does not." In particular, the study found that the U.S. Constitution guarantees relatively few rights compared to the constitutions of other countries and contains less than half (26 of 60) of the provisions listed in the average bill of rights. It is also one of the few in the world today that still features the right to keep and bear arms; the only others are the constitutions of Guatemala and Mexico. Overall, the research suggests that the Constitution of Canada, revised in 1982, is now a leading international model rather than that of the United States.

Supreme Court Justice Ruth Bader Ginsburg viewed the United States Constitution as more of a relic of the 18th century rather than as a model for new constitutions. She suggested in 2012 that a nation seeking a new constitution might find a better model by examining the Constitution of South Africa (1997), the Canadian Charter of Rights and Freedoms (1982) and the European Convention on Human Rights (1950):

I would not look to the United States Constitution if I were drafting a constitution in the year 2012.

— Ruth Bader Ginsburg, 2012

== Translations ==
The Federal Judicial Center links to translations of the U.S. Constitution in nine languages. The site offers other materials in eighteen languages besides English, such as Dari, Indonesian, Malay, Serb, and Turkish. The center's statutory mission includes working with judges and court officials of the U.S. and other nations to improve the administration of justice.

The Constitution Finder of the University of Richmond has links to translations into ten different languages. The Historical Society of Pennsylvania lists a translation into Armenian.

Professor James Chen has annotated the Spanish translation prepared by the U.S. State Department. His notes focus on the problems and nuances of this translation. Elizabeth Claire has rewritten the Constitution into simplified English. Some of the many translations of the Constitution are listed below.

- Arabic
- Chinese
- Dutch
- Finnish
- French
- Georgian
- German
- Hebrew
- Hungarian
- Italian
- Japanese
- Korean
- Latin
- Portuguese
- Russian
- Slovak
- Spanish
- Swedish
- Thai
- Ukrainian
- Vietnamese

=== The Bill of Rights ===
The U.S. State Department lists translations of the Bill of Rights into fifty-one languages:

Amharic, Arabic, Armenian, Azeri, Bengali, Bosnian, Bulgarian, Burmese, Chinese, Croatian, Czech, Dutch, French, Georgian, German, Greek, Haitian Creole, Hausa, Hindi, Hungarian, Indonesian, Italian, Japanese, Kazakh, Khmer, Korean, Kurdish, Malay, Nepali, Pashto, Persian, Polish, Portuguese-Brazilian, Portuguese-Continental, Punjabi, Romanian, Russian, Serbian, Somali, Spanish, Swahili, Swedish, Tagalog, Thai, Turkish, Uighur, Ukrainian, Urdu, Uzbek, Vietnamese, Yoruba

A second site links to the following translations: Arabic, Armenian, Chinese (simplified), French, German, Greek, Hebrew, Japanese, Korean, Polish, Romanian, Russian, Spanish. The Bill of Rights has been translated into Hawaiian.

== Commemorative stamps ==
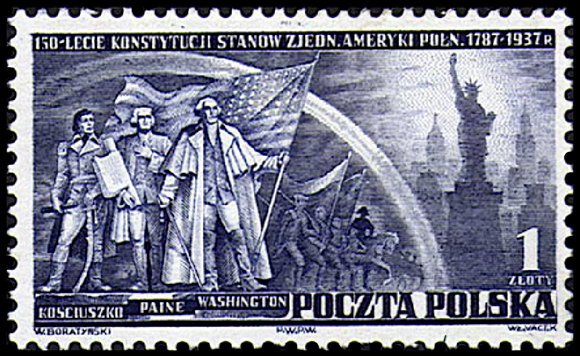
150th Anniversary
2nd Polish Republic, 1938

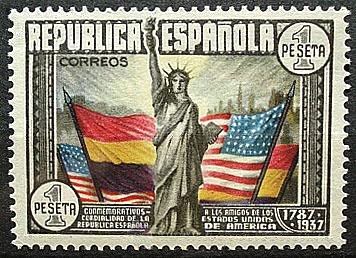
150th Anniversary
2nd Spanish Republic, 1937

In 1937 the U.S. Post Office released a commemorative stamp to celebrate the 150th anniversary of the signing of the U.S. Constitution. The engraving shown on this issue is after an 1856 painting by Junius Brutus Stearns of Washington and shows delegates signing the Constitution at the 1787 Convention. George Washington is on dais with an open document in hand; James Madison sits at the table, taking his famous notes on the convention.

One commemorative of the 19th Amendment (permitting women the right to vote) was celebrated in a commemorative in 1950 and again in 1970. The woman is voting in a curtained mechanical voting booth. She chooses levers to punch or mark her votes on a paper roll. The Model T has a male driver with a banner "Votes for women" on the car, women riders and marchers as though in a parade.

The Second Polish Republic issued a commemorative of the U.S. and Polish Constitutions in 1938 under the government of Prime Minister, Major General Składkowski The stamp features George Washington in military regalia, holding a 48-star American flag and a drawn sword. Thomas Paine holds a book on a rod, and Kosciuszko poses with a cross and saber. The next scene shows a line of infantry flying a Polish flag. The right panel shows the Statue of Liberty imposed in front of the New York 1930s skyline.

In 1937 the Second Spanish Republic commemorated the 150th anniversary of the signing of the U.S. Constitution, under the government of Prime Minister Juan Negrín of the Spanish Socialist Workers' Party (PSOE). The Statue of Liberty is the central focus, flanked by flags of Spain and the United States. The Spanish Republic Flag of red, yellow and purple, as battle flag or civil ensign, lacks the coat of arms.

== See also ==
- History of the constitution of the United Kingdom § Worldwide influence
