= Committee of Five =

Drafters of the U.S. Declaration of Independence

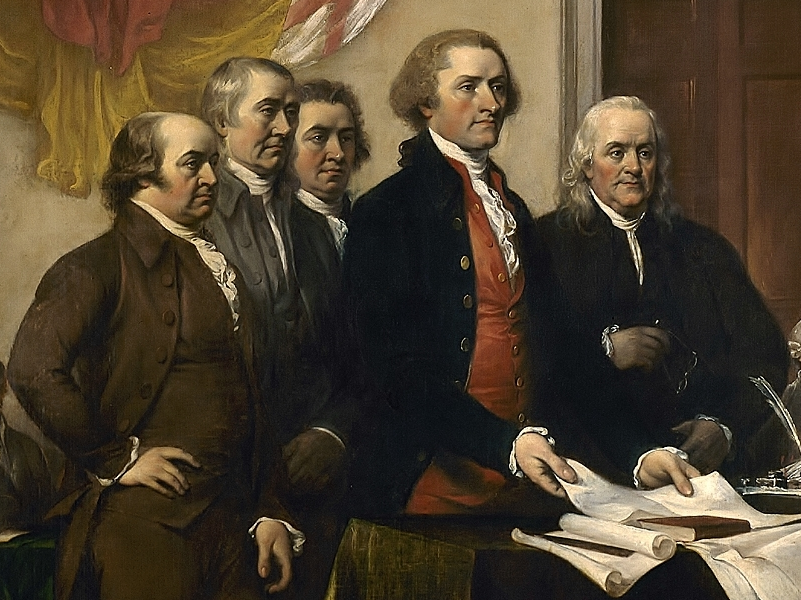
Detail from John Trumbull's 1818 painting of the Committee of Five presenting their draft of the Declaration of Independence to the Second Continental Congress in Philadelphia. From left to right: John Adams, Roger Sherman, Robert Livingston, Thomas Jefferson, Benjamin Franklin.

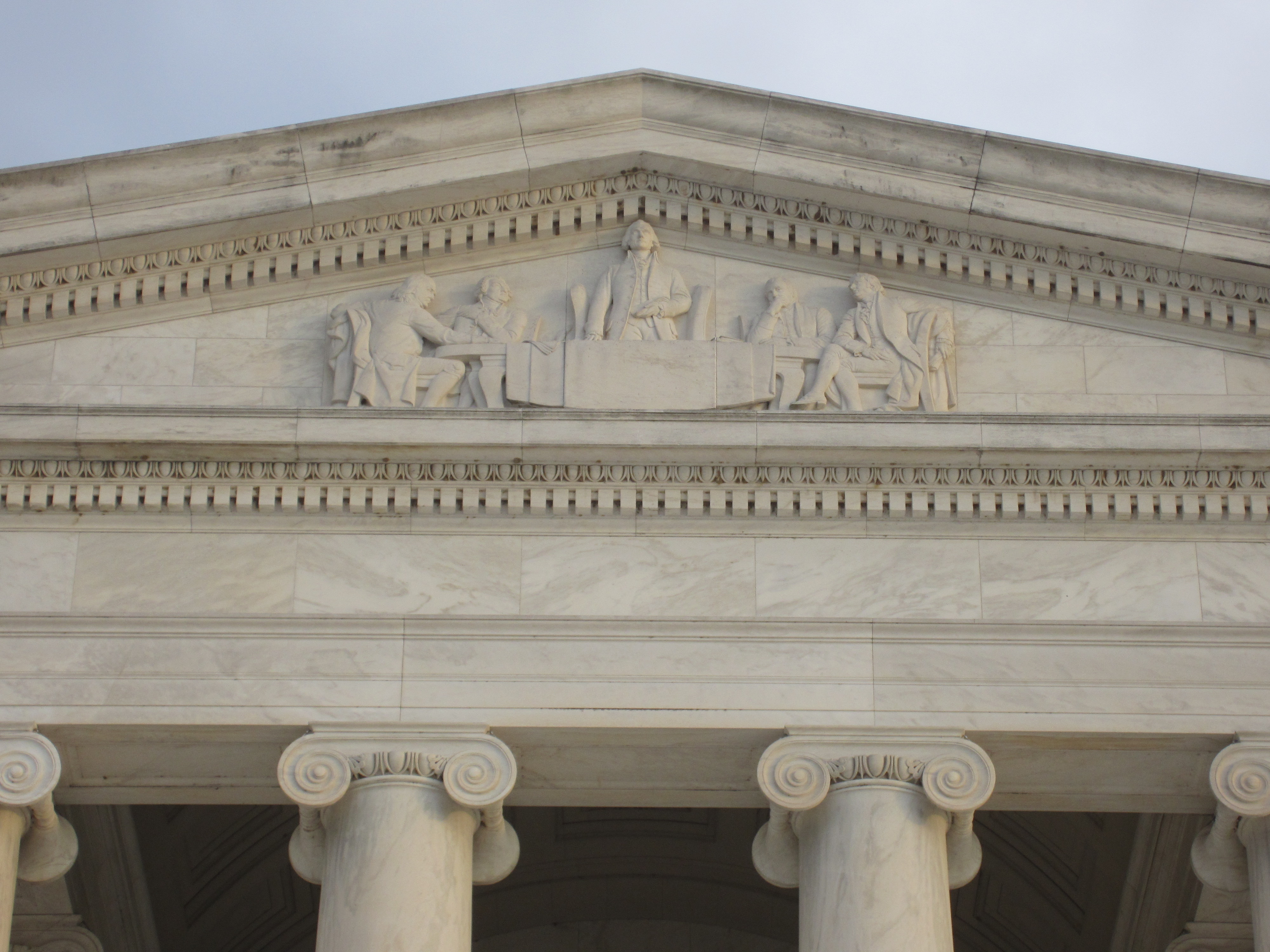
The Jefferson Memorial depicts the Committee of Five on a pediment sculpture by Adolph Alexander Weinman.

The Committee of Five of the Second Continental Congress was a group of five members who drafted and presented to the full Congress in Pennsylvania State House what would become the United States Declaration of Independence of July 4, 1776. This Declaration committee operated from June 11, 1776, until July 5, 1776, the day on which the Declaration was published.

The committee was composed of John Adams, Benjamin Franklin, Thomas Jefferson, Robert Livingston, and Roger Sherman.

== The Committee of Five ==
The members of this committee were:

- John Adams, representative of Massachusetts, who later became the second president of the United States
- Thomas Jefferson, representative of Virginia, who later became the third president of the United States
- Benjamin Franklin, representative of Pennsylvania, known as one of the most famous intellectuals among the Founding Fathers, whose academic writings and press publications had a very significant influence in the American Revolution, the only person to sign the Declaration of Independence, Treaty of Alliance with France, Treaty of Paris, and U.S. Constitution
- Roger Sherman, representative of Connecticut, the only person to sign all four of the U.S. state papers: the Continental Association, the Declaration, the Articles of Confederation, and the Constitution. Sherman proposed the Connecticut Compromise at the 1787 Constitutional Convention.
- Robert Livingston, representative of New York, who later served as the first United States Secretary of Foreign Affairs, administered the presidential oath of office at the first inauguration of George Washington and negotiated the Louisiana Purchase as the minister to France.

== Drafting of the Declaration of Independence ==
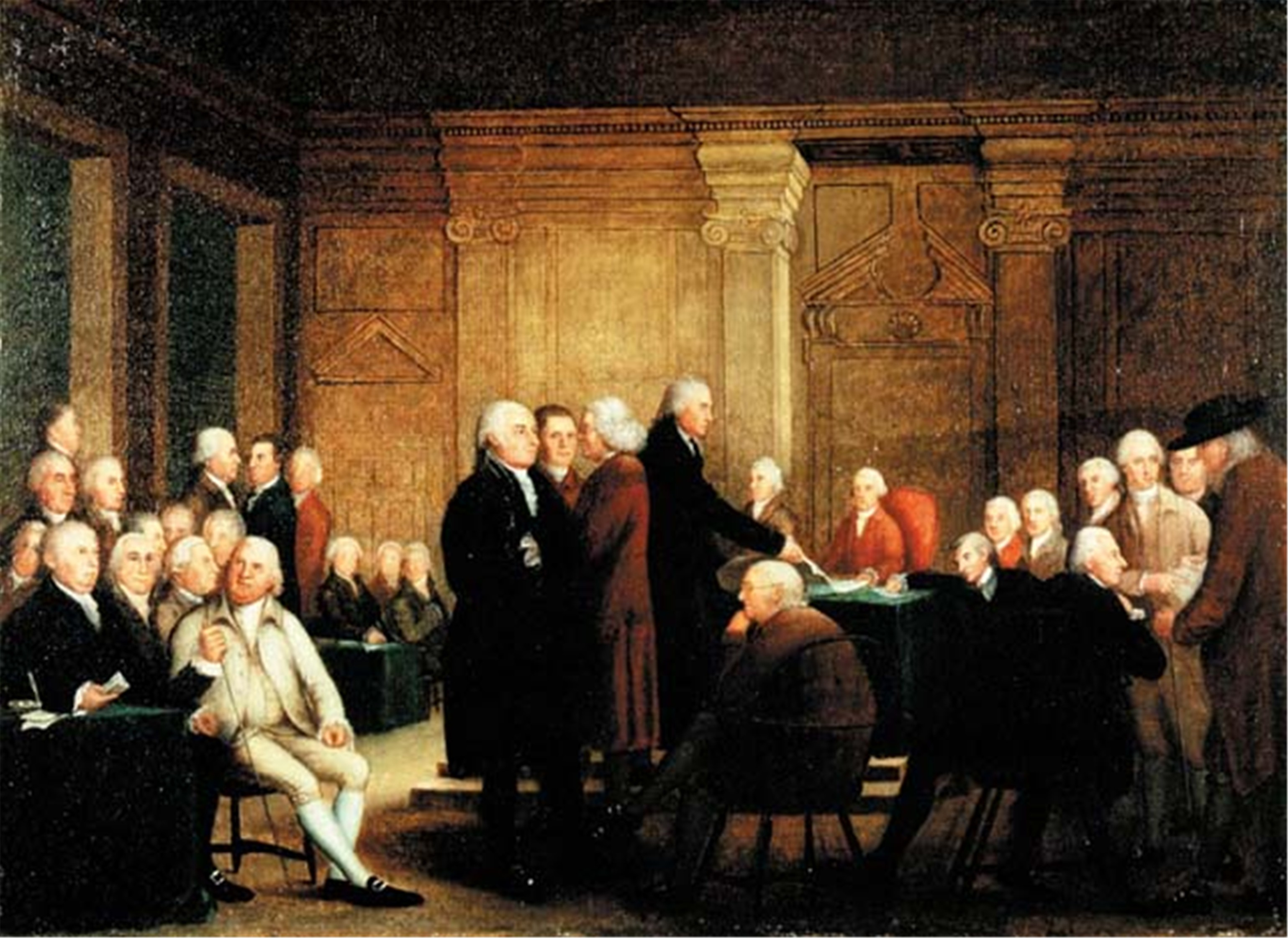
Congress Voting Independence, by Robert Edge Pine (1784–1788), depicts the Committee of Five in the center

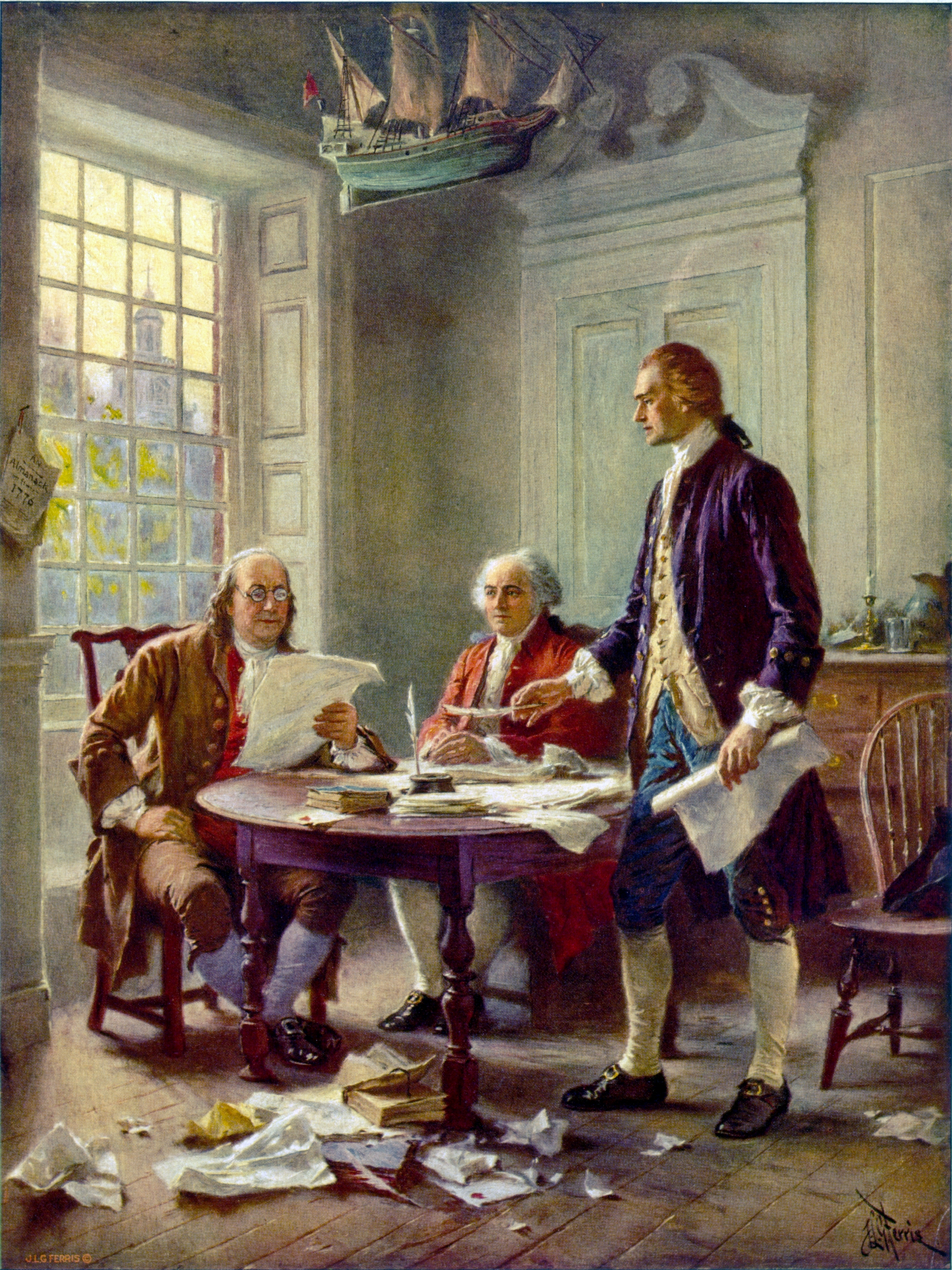
Writing the Declaration of Independence, 1776, Jean Leon Gerome Ferris' idealized 1900 depiction of (left to right) Benjamin Franklin, John Adams, and Thomas Jefferson of the Committee of Five working on the Declaration.

The delegates of the Thirteen Colonies in Congress resolved to postpone until Monday, July 1, the final consideration of whether or not to declare the several sovereign independencies of the Colonies, which had been proposed by the North Carolina resolutions of April 12 and the Virginia resolutions of May 15. The proposal, known as the Lee Resolution, was moved in Congress on June 7 by Richard Henry Lee of Virginia. During these allotted three weeks Congress agreed to appoint a committee to draft a statement to outline the reasons for the Colonies seceding from the British Empire. The actual declaration of "American Independence" is precisely the text comprising the final paragraph of the published broadside of July 4. The broadside's final paragraph repeated the text of the Lee Resolution as adopted by the declaratory resolve voted on July 2.

On June 11, the Committee of Five was appointed: John Adams, Roger Sherman, Robert Livingston, Benjamin Franklin, and Thomas Jefferson. Because the committee left no minutes, there is some uncertainty about how the drafting process proceeded. Accounts written many years later by Jefferson and Adams, although frequently cited, vary in some respects.

=== First draft ===
After discussing the general outline of the document, the Committee decided that Jefferson would write the first draft. With Congress's busy schedule, Jefferson had limited time to write the draft over the ensuing 17 days. He then consulted with the others on the committee, who reviewed the draft and made extensive changes. Jefferson then produced another copy incorporating these alterations.

Among the changes was the simplification of what Jefferson had termed "preservation of life, & liberty, & the pursuit of happiness" to the more succinct and sonorous phrase familiar to all today, “Life, Liberty and the pursuit of Happiness”. This shares some similarities with, but is distinct from, John Locke's prior description of private property as a natural right, in the phrase "life, liberty, and estate".

== Presentation of the draft ==
On June 28, 1776, the committee presented this copy to the "Committee of the Whole" Congress, which was commemorated by Trumbull’s famed painting. The title of the document was "A Declaration by the Representatives of the United States of America, in General Congress assembled".

=== Signing ===
Although not officially noted, the estimated time was 6:26 p.m. (18:26 LMT) for the recording of this historic vote. The Congress then heard the report of the Committee of the Whole and declared the sovereign status of the United Colonies the following day, during the afternoon of July 2. The Committee of the Whole then turned to the Declaration, and it was given a second reading before adjournment.

=== Last minute arguments ===
On Wednesday, July 3, the Committee of the Whole gave the Declaration the third reading and commenced scrutiny of the precise wording of the proposed text. But for two passages in the Committee of Five's draft that were rejected by the Committee of the Whole the work was accepted without any other major changes. One was a critical reference to the English people and the other was a denunciation of the slave trade and of slavery itself.

Jefferson wrote in his autobiography, of the two deleted passages:

The pusillanimous idea that we had friends in England worth keeping terms with still haunted the minds of many. For this reason, those passages which conveyed censures on the people of England were struck out, lest they should give them offense. The clause, too, reprobating the enslaving the inhabitants of Africa was struck out in complaisance to South Carolina and Georgia, who had never attempted to restrain the importation of slaves, and who, on the contrary, still wished to continue it. Our Northern brethren also, I believe, felt a little tender under these censures, for though their people had very few slaves themselves, yet they had been pretty considerable carriers of them to others.

As John Adams recalled many years later, this work of editing the proposed text was largely completed by the time of adjournment on July 3. However, the text's formal adoption was deferred until the following morning, when the Congress voted its agreement during the late morning of July 4.

=== Fair copy ===
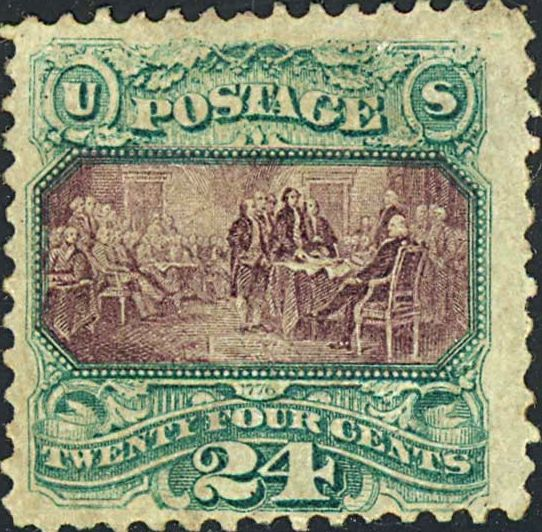
The Committee of Five, pictured on an 1869 U.S. Postal Service 24-cent stamp; the same image also appears on the present two-dollar bill.

The draft document as adopted was then referred back to the Committee of Five to prepare a "fair copy", this being the redrafted-as-corrected document prepared for delivery to the broadside printer, John Dunlap. And so the Committee of Five convened in the early evening of July 4 to complete its task.

Historians have had no documentary means by which to determine the identity of the authenticating party. It is unclear whether the Declaration was authenticated by the Committee of Five's signature, or the Committee submitted the fair copy to President Hancock for his authenticating signature, or the authentication awaited President John Hancock's signature on the printer's finished proof-copy of what became known as the Dunlap broadside. Either way, upon the July 5 release of the Dunlap Broadside of the Declaration, the Committee of Five's work was done.

=== Dunlap broadside release to the public ===
Following release of the Dunlap broadside on July 5, the public could read who had signed the Declaration. Hancock's signature, as President of the Continental Congress, appears on the broadside, as does that of Continental Congress Secretary Charles Thomson as a witness. Memories of the participants proved to be very short on this particular historic moment. Within 3 decades, the prominent members of the Committee of Five could no longer accurately recollect detail of what had taken place, or their active participation on July 4th and 5th of 1776. This led to the myth of one signing on July 4 by all the delegates to Congress.

=== First publication and public readings ===
Following its unanimous adoption by the 56 delegates of the Second Continental Congress on July 4, 1776, the Declaration was published two days later, on July 6, by The Pennsylvania Evening Post. The first public readings of the Declaration occurred simultaneously at three locations on July 8, 1776 at noon in Philadelphia, where it was read by John Nixon in the yard of present-day Independence Hall, Trenton, New Jersey, and Easton, Pennsylvania.

== See also ==
- Committee of Detail, drafted the Constitution of the United States
- Founding Fathers of the United States
