= Don Rose (disambiguation) =

Don Rose (1934–2005) was an American radio personality.

Don Rose may also refer to:

- Don Rose (baseball) (born 1947), American professional baseball player
- Don Rose, record label executive for Rykodisc
- Don McGuire (actor) (born Don Rose, 1919–1999), American actor, director, screenwriter and producer

== See also ==
- Donald Frank Rose (1890–1964), American newspaper columnist and author
