= Printing of the United States Constitution =

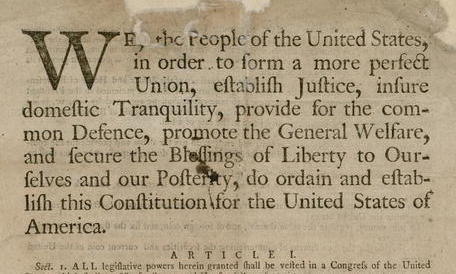
Preamble detail from a Dunlap & Claypoole original printing of the United States Constitution

The United States Constitution was first printed by Dunlap & Claypoole in 1787, during the Constitutional Convention. From the original printing, 13 original copies are known to exist.

== Dunlap & Claypoole ==
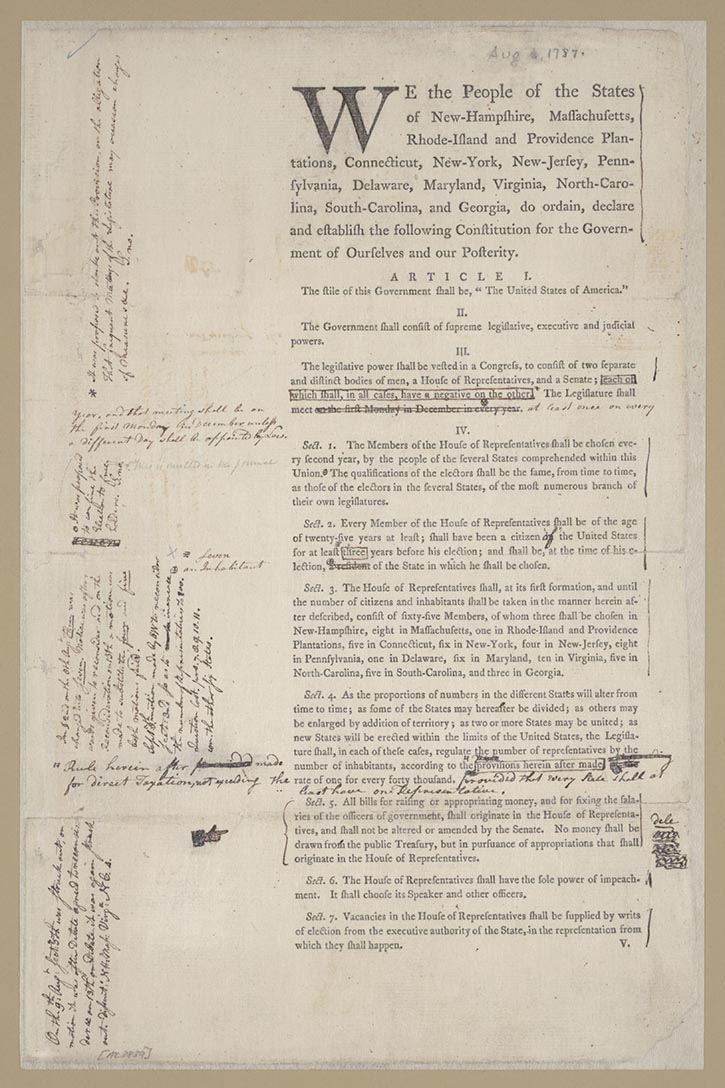
Alexander Hamilton's copy of the first printed draft

The Constitutional Convention's printers, Dunlap & Claypoole, printed the drafts and final copies of the United States Constitution. John Dunlap and David C. Claypoole had printed for Congress since 1775, including the first copies of the Declaration of Independence and Articles of Confederation, and were designated Congress's official printer in 1778. During the 1787 Constitutional Convention, Dunlap & Claypoole printed 820 draft copies and 500 final copies at a total cost of $420.

John Dunlap received the first draft of the Constitution from the Committee of Detail for printing as a seven-page broadside on August 4, 1787, and was turned around in two days for the Convention's members. Copies of this first draft exist in the separately collected papers of the Convention, James Madison, and David Brearley.

In early September, the Constitution was referred to the Committee of "Stile and arrangements" for revisions, with new copies of this second draft printed on September 12 for the convention's members. The Convention read the amended report the next day. Extant copies of this four-folio and penultimate draft of the Constitution rest in the papers of Madison and Brearley, as well as those of George Washington (Library of Congress), each with markings made over the next three days.

Three days following the second draft's printing, the Convention, with its business concluded, ordered a printing of 500 copies of the third and final draft on September 15, to be dated September 17, 1787, when the Convention's proceedings and its engrossed Constitution were to be signed. Apart from interlineations, the printed and engrossed versions are identical. The Constitutional Congress sent the Convention's report for state ratification on September 28. The Congress's records indicate orders of 200 additional copies in close proximity to their resolution.

In the final Constitution's printing, Dunlap & Claypoole produced 500 copies of a six-page broadside with Caslon small-pica type. Its sole typographical error mistakenly spelled out a number in Article Five but was corrected in subsequent reprints.

=== Extant final copies ===
Extant copies of the Dunlap & Claypoole final Constitution
| # | Location | City | Provenance | Ref |
|---|---|---|---|---|
| 1 | American Philosophical Society Library | Philadelphia | | Benjamin Franklin copy, inscribed to Rev. Lathrop |
| 2 | Crystal Bridges Museum of American Art | Bentonville, Arkansas | Sotheby's sale to S. Howard Goldman, 1988. Sotheby's sale to Kenneth C. Griffin, 2021, setting auction record for a book or manuscript. On loan for public exhibition. | |
| 3 | Delaware Hall of Records, Bureau of Archives and Records | Dover, Delaware | | |
| 4 | Historical Society of Pennsylvania | Philadelphia | | |
| 5 | Independence National Historical Park | Philadelphia | George Washington copy | |
| 6 | Library of Congress Manuscript Division | Washington, D.C. | Edmund Pendleton copy in Andrew Jackson Donelson papers | |
| 7 | Library of Congress Manuscript Division | Washington, D.C. | James Madison papers | |
| 8 | New Jersey State Library Archives and History Bureau | Trenton, New Jersey | | |
| 9 | New-York Historical Society | New York City | Gilder Lerhman Collection; Benjamin Franklin copy, inscribed to Jonathan Williams Sr., Esq., missing last two pages | |
| 10 | Public Record Office, Foreign Office | London | Phineas Bond to the Marquis of Carmarthen | |
| 11 | Huntington Library | San Marino, California | | |
| 12 | Princeton University Library's Scheide Library | Princeton, New Jersey | | |
| 13 | Alexander Van Sinderen | | Loaned to Stanford University Libraries exhibit, 1987–1988; to be auctioned by Sotheby's at a future date; its last auction had been in 1894 | |

There are 12 remaining complete final printings (and one incomplete) of the Constitution known to exist (Evans 20818). The final printings were rarely auctioned in the 200 years since their printing.

In 2024 a copy of the official edition endorsed by the Congress of the Confederation (Evans 20817) appeared at Brunk Auctions and sold for $9m. This printing, by McClean of New York on behalf of Dunlap and Claypoole, was printed on September 28, 1787 and is distinct from the final printings produced by Dunlap and Claypoole in Philadelphia on September 27, 1787 (Evans 20818).

Dunlap & Claypoole four-page folio

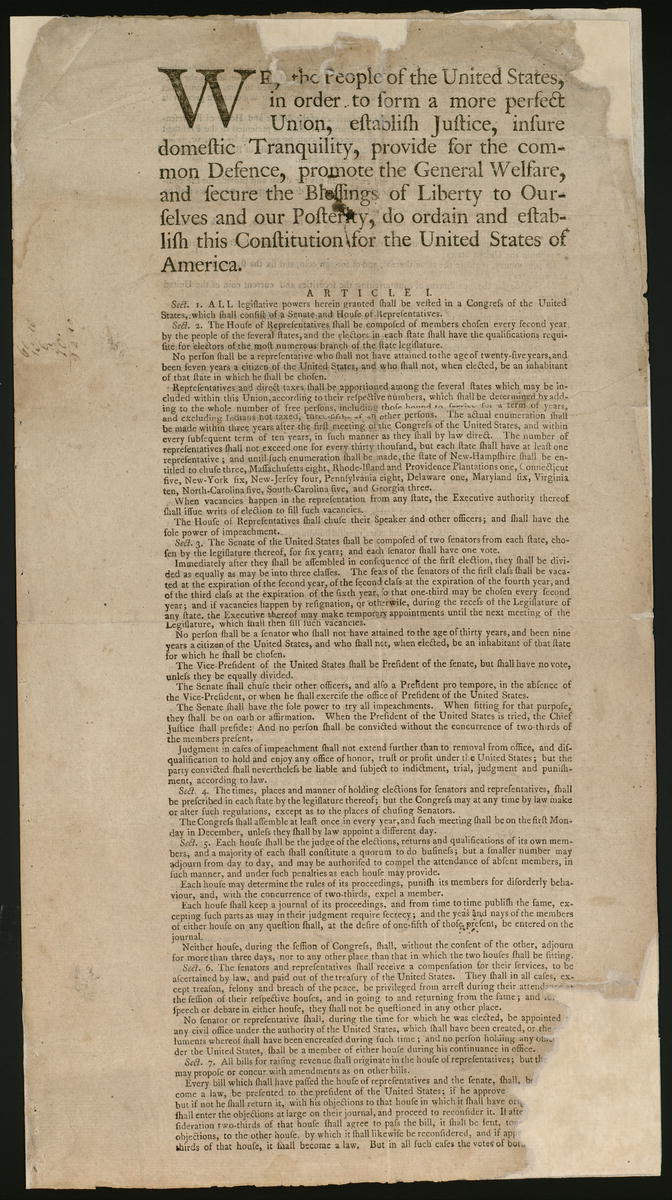

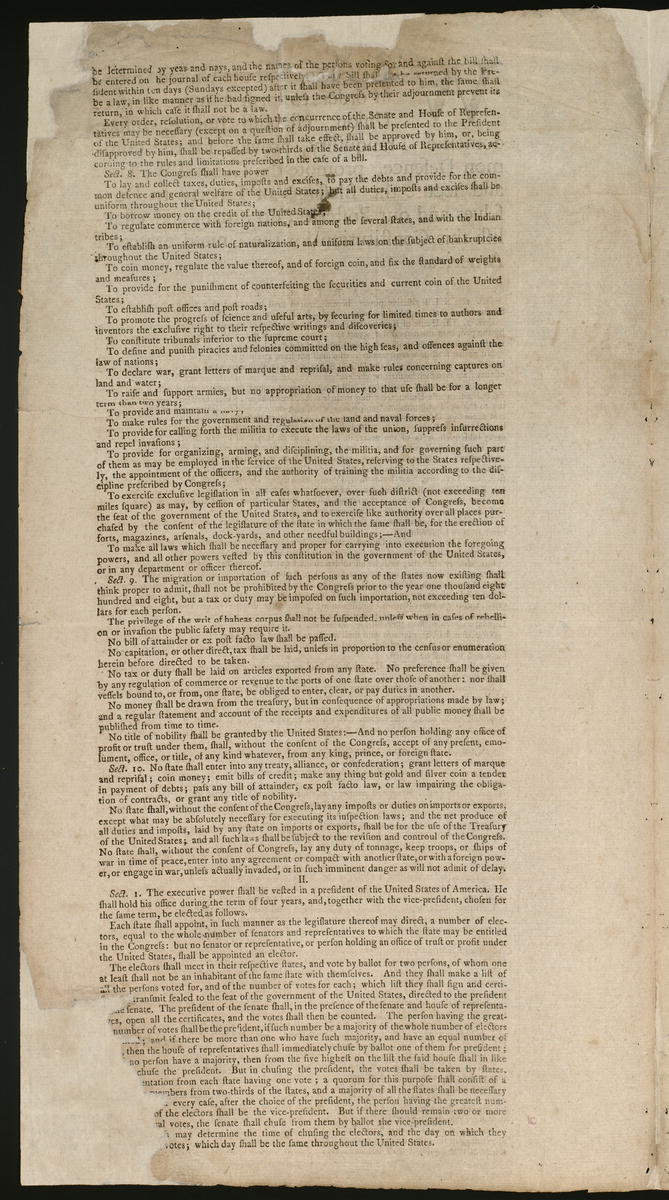

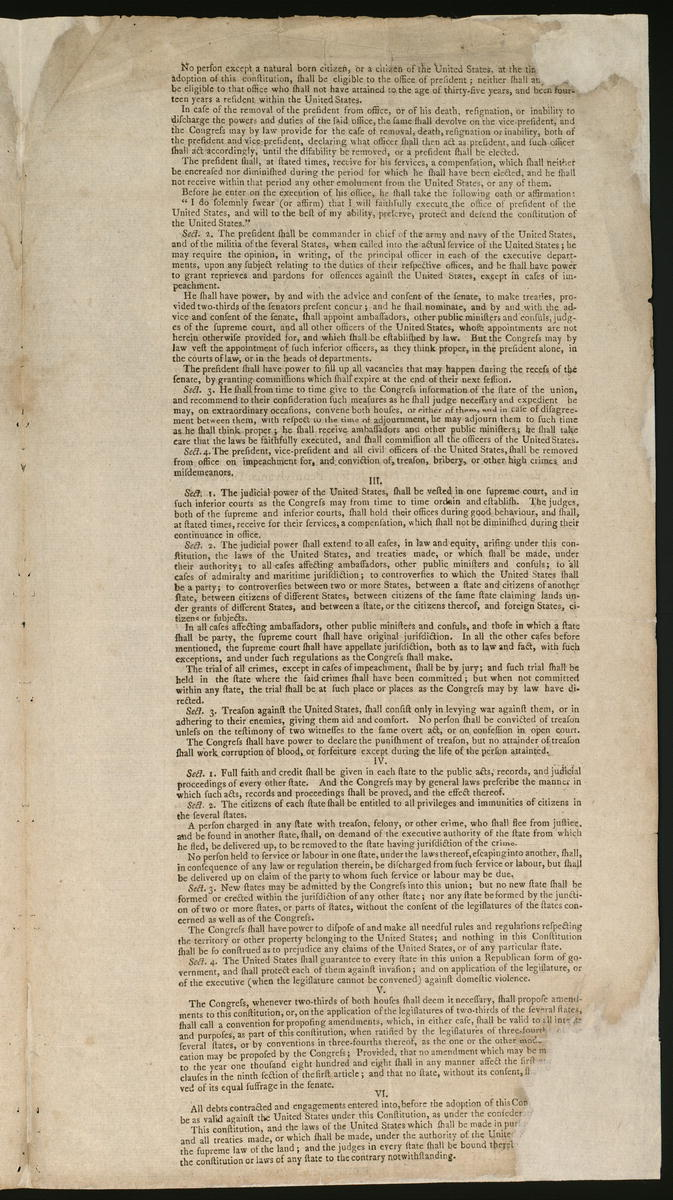

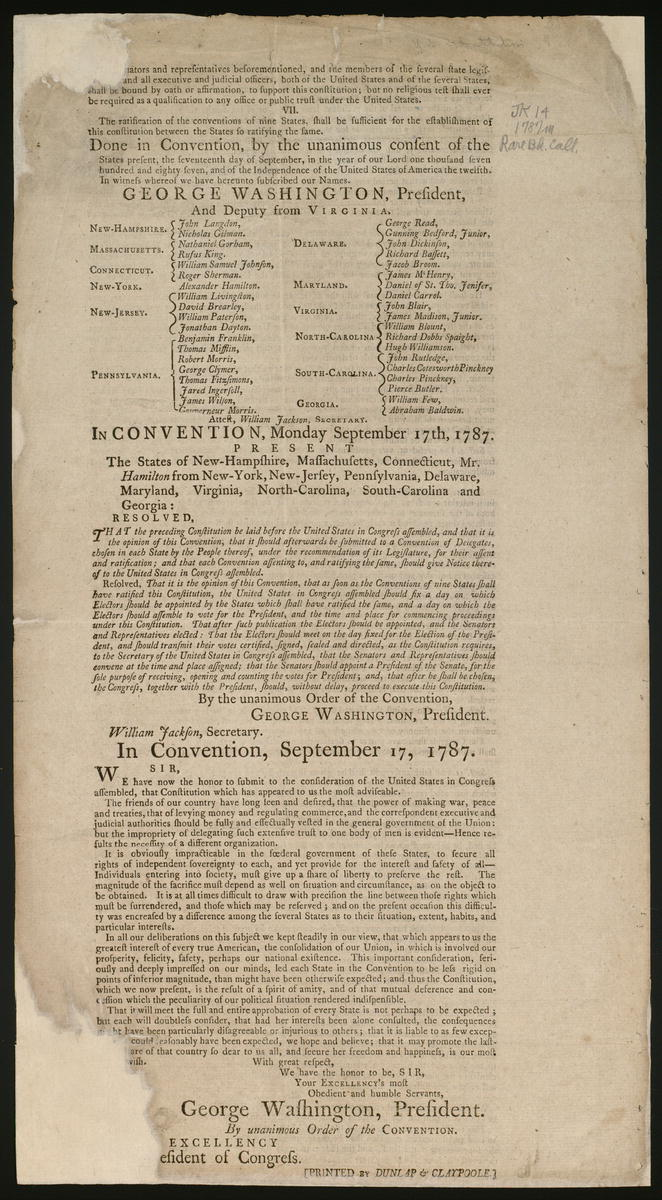

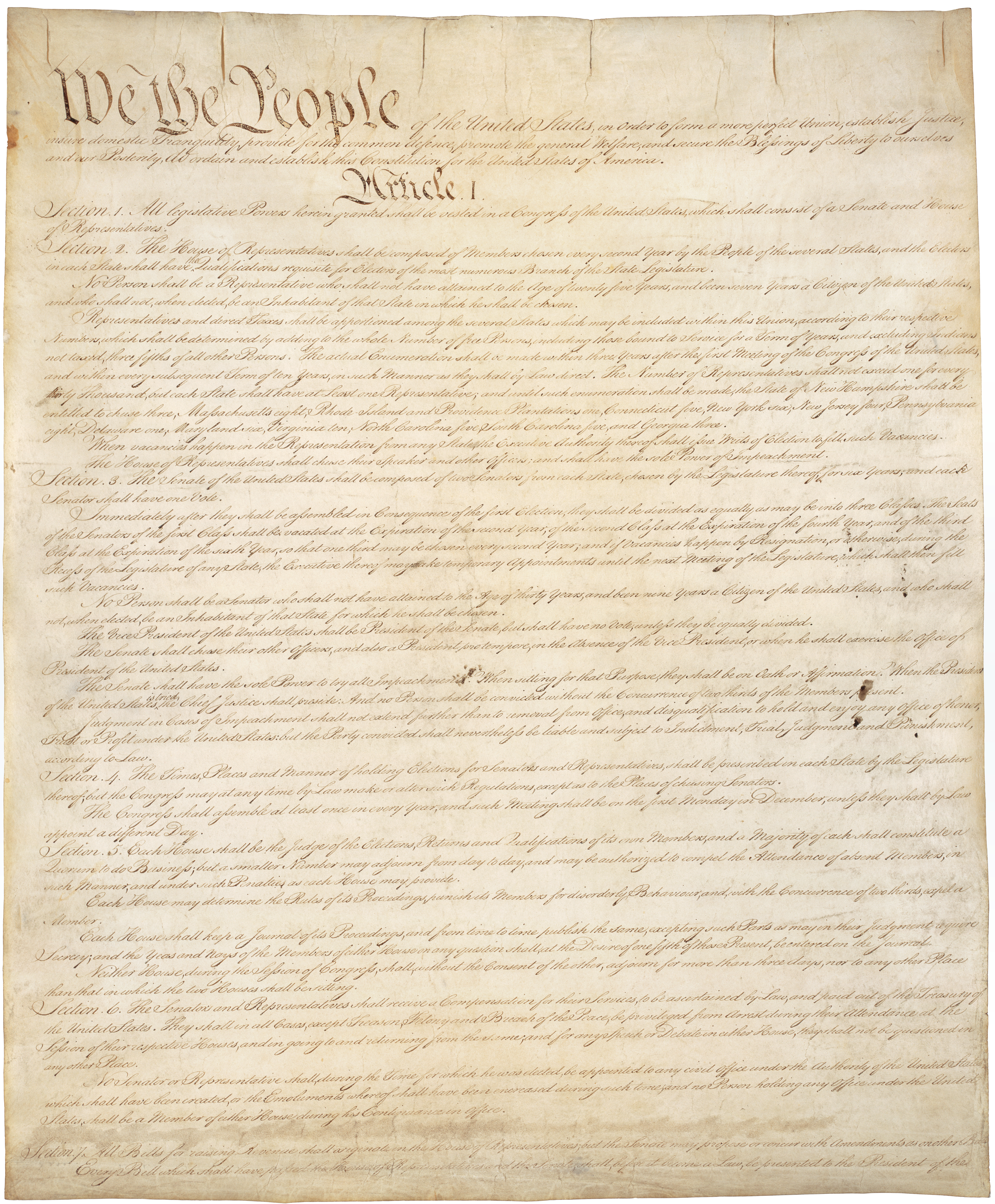
Engrossed copy by Jacob Shallus, part of the Charters of Freedom

== See also ==
- Physical history of the United States Declaration of Independence
- ConstitutionDAO
- List of most expensive books and manuscripts

== Bibliography ==
- Carter, George H., ed. (1934). The Declaration of Independence and the Constitution of the United States of America. Congressional Serial Set. No. 9747. S. Doc. No. 79, 73rd Cong., 1st Sess. United States Government Printing Office.
