= Physical history of the United States Declaration of Independence =

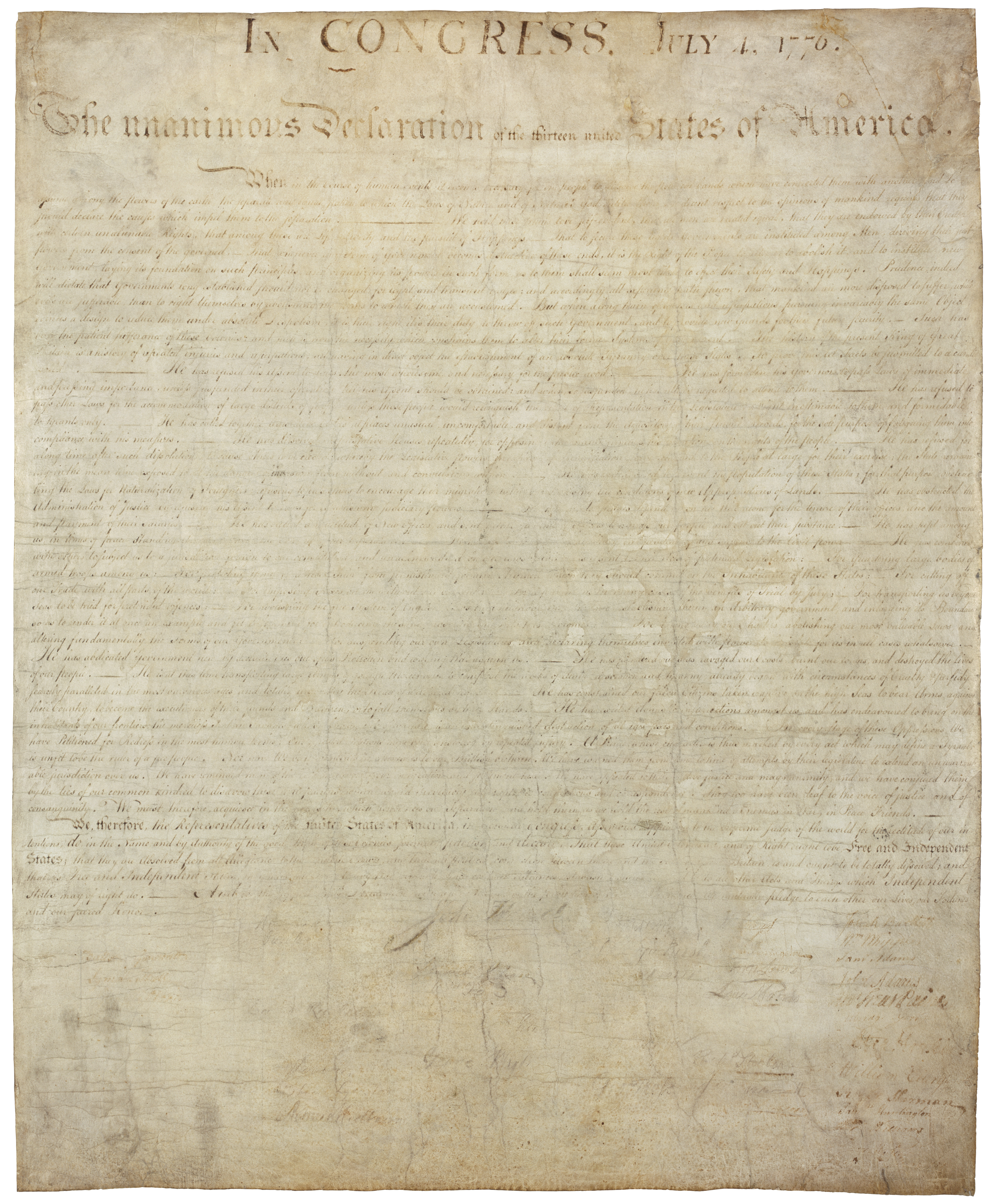
The signed copy of the Declaration, engrossed by Timothy Matlack in July 1776 and now badly faded, is displayed in the Charters of Freedom rotunda at the National Archives in Washington, D.C.

The physical history of the United States Declaration of Independence spans from its original drafting in 1776 into the discovery of historical documents in the 21st century. This includes a number of drafts, handwritten copies, and published broadsides. The Declaration of Independence states that the Thirteen Colonies were now the "United Colonies" which "are, and of Right ought to be Free and Independent States"; and were no longer a part of the British Empire.

== Drafts and pre-publication copies ==
=== Composition Draft ===
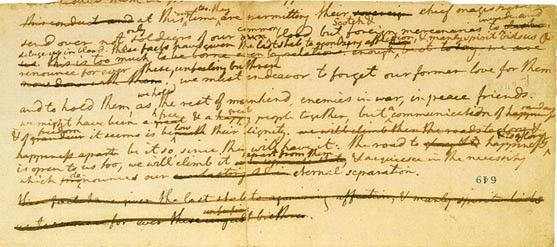
The Composition Draft, written by Thomas Jefferson in July 1776

The earliest known draft of the Declaration of Independence is a fragment known as the "Composition Draft". The draft, written in July 1776, is in the handwriting of Thomas Jefferson, principal author of the Declaration. It was discovered in 1947 by historian Julian P. Boyd in the Jefferson papers at the Library of Congress. Boyd was examining primary documents for publication in The Papers of Thomas Jefferson when he found the document, a piece of paper that contains a small part of the text of the Declaration, as well as some unrelated notes made by Jefferson. Prior to Boyd's discovery, the only known draft of the Declaration had been a document known as the Rough Draft. The discovery confirmed speculation by historians that Jefferson must have written more than one draft of the text.

Many of the words from the Composition Draft were ultimately deleted by Congress from the final text of the Declaration. George Mason was a Virginian politician and wrote the Virginia Declaration of Rights in May–June 1776. Mason wrote something very similar to Jefferson's first section of the declaration. Its opening was:

Section 1. That all men are by nature equally free and independent, and have certain inherent rights, of which, when they enter into a state of society, they cannot, by any compact, deprive or divest their posterity; namely, the enjoyment of life and liberty, with the means of acquiring and possessing property, and pursuing and obtaining happiness and safety.

Phrases from the fragment to survive the editing process include "acquiesce in the necessity, which denounces our separation" and "hold them, as we hold the rest of mankind, Enemies in War, in Peace Friends".

Forensic examination has determined that the paper of the Composition Draft and the paper of the Rough Draft were made by the same manufacturer. In 1995, conservators at the Library of Congress undid some previous restoration work on the fragment and placed it in a protective mat. The document is stored in a cold storage vault. When it is exhibited, the fragment is placed in a temperature and humidity controlled display case.

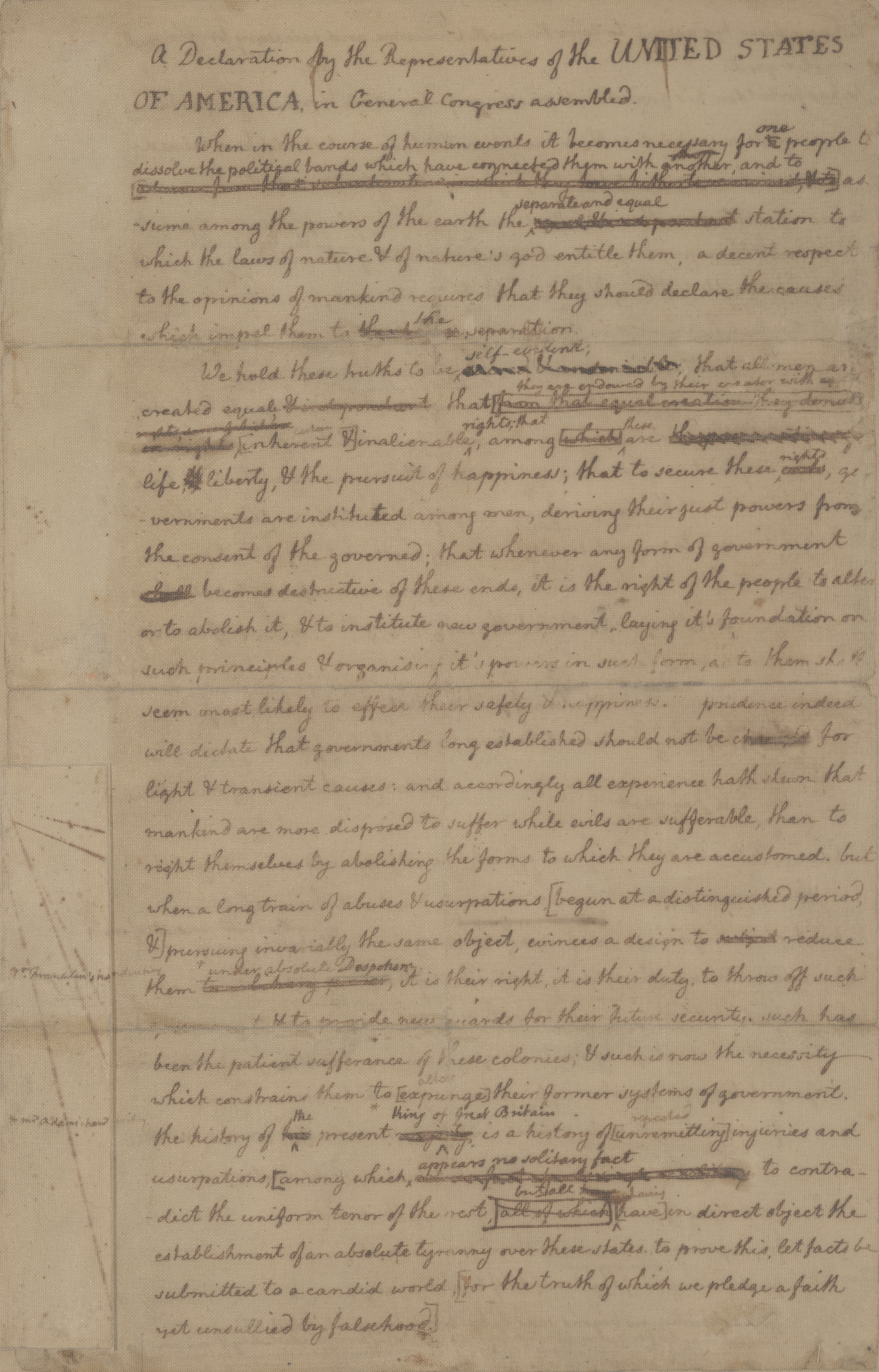
The first page of Thomas Jefferson's rough draft (pgs 2, 3, 4)

=== Rough Draft ===
Thomas Jefferson preserved a four-page draft that late in life he called the "original Rough draft". Known to historians as the Rough Draft, early students of the Declaration believed that this was a draft written alone by Jefferson and then presented to the Committee of Five drafting committee. Some scholars now believe that the Rough Draft was not actually an "original Rough draft", but was instead a revised version completed by Jefferson after consultation with the committee. How many drafts Jefferson wrote prior to this one, and how much of the text was contributed by other committee members, is unknown.

Jefferson showed the Rough Draft to John Adams and Benjamin Franklin, and perhaps other members of the drafting committee. Adams and Franklin made a few more changes. Franklin, for example, may have been responsible for changing Jefferson's original phrase "We hold these truths to be sacred and undeniable" to "We hold these truths to be self-evident." Jefferson incorporated these changes into a copy that was submitted to Congress in the name of the committee. Jefferson kept the Rough Draft and made additional notes on it as Congress revised the text. He also made several copies of the Rough Draft without the changes made by Congress, which he sent to friends, including Richard Henry Lee and George Wythe, after July 4. At some point in the process, Adams also wrote out a copy.

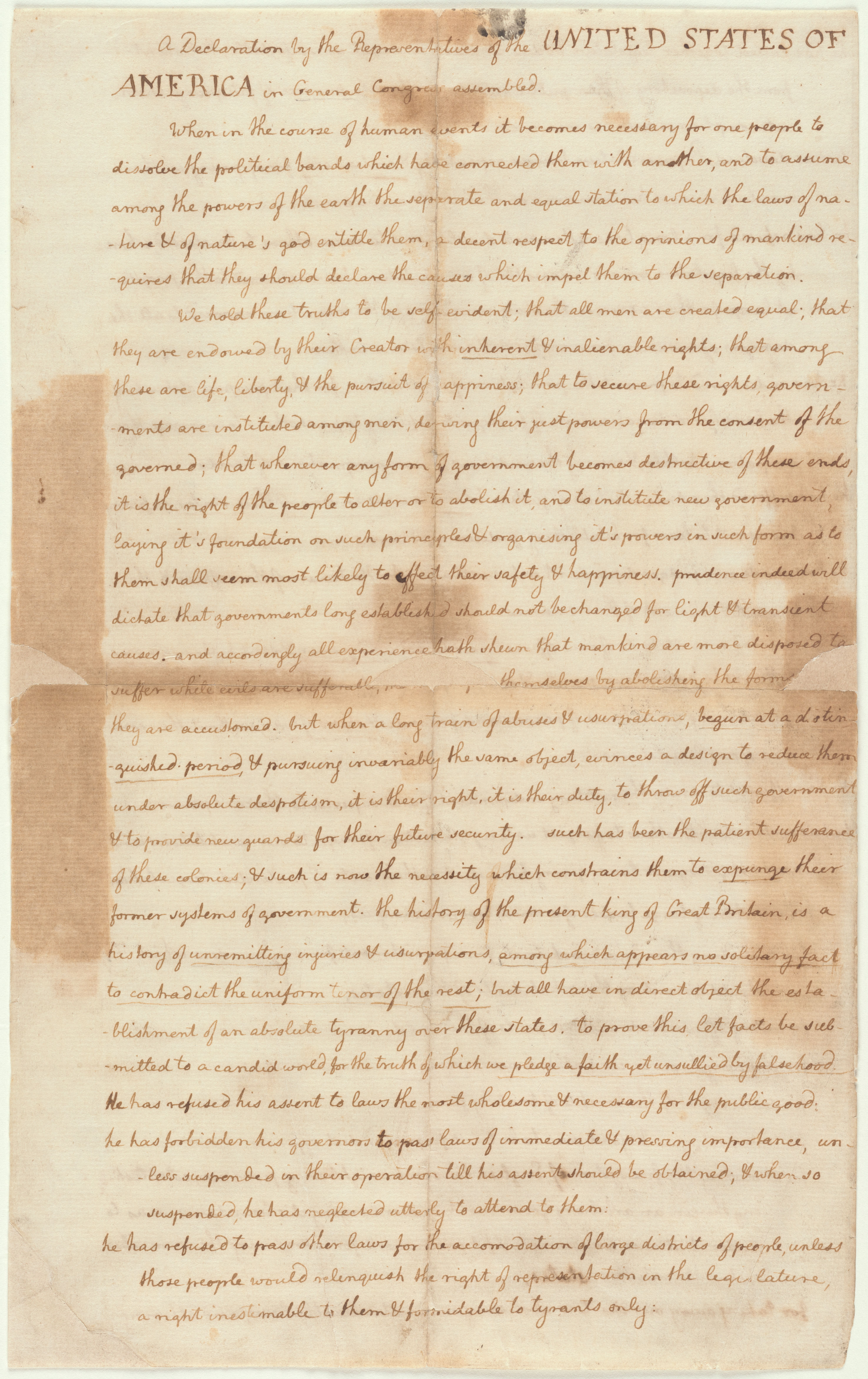
The first page of the 'Committee draught' as submitted to Congress, written by Thomas Jefferson's hand (pgs 2, 3, 4)

=== Fair Copy ===
In 1823, Jefferson wrote a letter to James Madison in which he recounted the drafting process. After making alterations to his draft as suggested by Franklin and Adams, he recalled that "I then wrote a fair copy, reported it to the Committee, and from them, unaltered, to Congress." If Jefferson's memories were correct, and he indeed wrote out a fair copy which was shown to the drafting committee and then submitted to Congress on June 28, this document has not been found. "If this manuscript still exists," wrote historian Ted Widmer, "it is the holy grail of American freedom."

The Fair Copy was presumably marked up by Charles Thomson, the secretary of the Continental Congress, while Congress debated and revised the text. This document was the one that Congress approved on July 4, making it what Boyd called the first "official" copy of the Declaration. The Fair Copy was sent to John Dunlap to be printed under the title "A Declaration by the Representatives of the united states of america, in General Congress assembled". Boyd argued that if a document was signed in Congress on July 4, it would have been the Fair Copy, and probably would have been signed only by John Hancock with his signature being attested by Thomson.

The Fair Copy may have been destroyed in the printing process, or destroyed during the debates in accordance with Congress's secrecy rule. Author Wilfred J. Ritz speculates that the Fair Copy was immediately sent to the printer so that copies could be made for each member of Congress to consult during the debate, and that all of these copies were then destroyed to preserve secrecy.

== Broadsides ==
The Declaration was first published as a broadside printed by John Dunlap of Philadelphia. One broadside was pasted into Congress's journal, making it what Boyd called the "second official version" of the Declaration. Dunlap's broadsides were distributed throughout the thirteen states. Upon receiving these broadsides, many states issued their own broadside editions.

=== Dunlap broadside ===
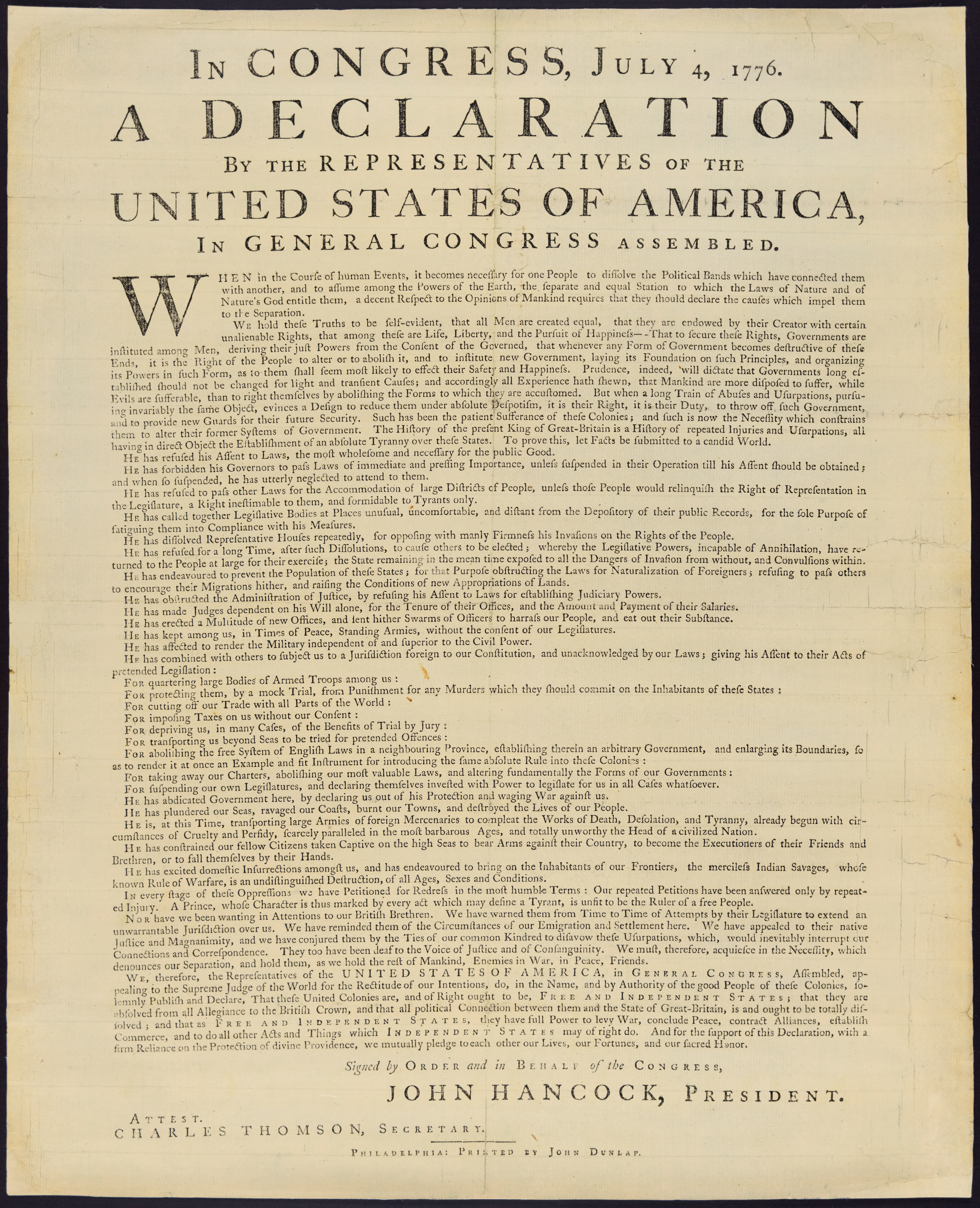
The Library of Congress's copy of the Dunlap broadside.

The Dunlap broadsides are the first published copies of the Declaration of Independence, printed on the night of July 4, 1776. It is unknown exactly how many broadsides were originally printed, but the number is estimated at 200. John Hancock's eventually famous signature is not on this document, but his name appears in large type under "Signed by Order and in Behalf of the Congress", with secretary Charles Thomson listed as a witness ("Attest").

On July 4, 1776, Congress ordered the same committee charged with writing the document to "superintend and correct the press", that is, supervise the printing. Dunlap, an Irish immigrant then 29 years old, was tasked with the job; he apparently spent much of the night of July 4 setting type, correcting it, and running off the broadside sheets.

"There is evidence it was done quickly, and in excitement—watermarks are reversed, some copies look as if they were folded before the ink could dry and bits of punctuation move around from one copy to another", according to Ted Widmer, author of Ark of the Liberties: America and the World. "It is romantic to think that Benjamin Franklin, the greatest printer of his day, was there in Dunlap's shop to supervise, and that Jefferson, the nervous author, was also close at hand." John Adams later wrote, "We were all in haste." The Dunlap broadsides were sent across the new United States over the next two days, including to Commander-in-Chief of the Continental Army, George Washington, who directed that the Declaration be read to the troops on July 9. Another copy was sent to England.

In 1949, 14 copies of the Dunlap broadside were known to exist. The number had increased to 21 by 1975. There were 24 known copies of the Dunlap broadside in 1989, when a 25th broadside was discovered behind a painting bought for four dollars at a flea market. Another copy was discovered in 2009 in The National Archives in Kew, England. An early assessment concluded that it was part of a group of papers seized from American colonists during the American Revolutionary War.

==== 2009 Dunlap Broadside Provenance ====
The 26th Broadside was discovered amongst the files of the The National Archives UK as a result of an American antiquarian bookseller's research. For years, the provenance of the broadside remained unknown until 2022, when Emily Sneff, a Philadelphia based historian, matched up accompanying documents to its original owner, Jewish-American merchant, Jonas Phillips, who attempted to ship out the broadside to his cousin, Gumpel Samson, to spread the word of the Declaration to the Netherlands.

To confuse patrolling British naval searches, a note written in Yiddish to Samson accompanied it, with Phillips only intending to share the news of a "declaration of that whole country [United States]", in addition to a promissory note addressed to Phillip's mother in Germany.

The broadside and the attachments were confiscated by the British, and stashed away in the Archives, with some stamps from cataloguing during the Victorian era, before its 2009 discovery, followed by Sneff's provenance find.

As part of the United States Semiquincentennial celebrations, the Phillips broadside is loaned to the Museum of the American Revolution from 18 October 2025 - 3 January 2027.

==== List of extant Dunlap broadsides ====
| # | Location | Owner | Provenance | Reference |
|---|---|---|---|---|
| 1 | New Haven, Connecticut | Beinecke Library, Yale University | | |
| 2 | Bloomington, Indiana | Lilly Library, Indiana University | Previous owner was Henry N. Flynt of Greenwich, Connecticut. | |
| 3 | Portland, Maine | Maine Historical Society | Given to the society in 1893 at the bequest of John S. H. Fogg. | |
| 4 | Chicago, Illinois | Chicago Historical Society | Signed by John Steward (1747–1829) of Goshen, New York; sold July 2, 1975, at auction, by Christie's, London; later sold to the Chicago Historical Society. | |
| 5 | Baltimore, Maryland | Maryland Historical Society | Fragment of upper left area of the document, including the first 36 lines. | |
| 6 | Boston, Massachusetts | Massachusetts Historical Society | | |
| 7 | Cambridge, Massachusetts | Houghton Library, Harvard University | Donated in 1947 by Carleton R. Richmond. | |
| 8 | Williamstown, Massachusetts | Williams College | Previously owned by the Wood family; sold at auction, April 22, 1983, by Christie's, New York. | |
| 9 | Princeton, New Jersey | Scheide Library, Firestone Library, Princeton University | Currently owned by William R. Scheide; bought by John H. Scheide from A. S. W. Rosenbach. | |
| 10 | New York, New York (last known location) | Private collector | Sold by the New-York Historical Society to a private collector in the United States, sometime between 1993 and 2008. | |
| 11 | New York, New York | New York Public Library | | |
| 12 | New York, New York | Morgan Library | Once owned by the Chew family; sold April 1, 1982, at auction at Christie's, New York. | |
| 13 | Exeter, New Hampshire | American Independence Museum | Copy discovered in 1985 in the Ladd-Gilman House in Exeter. | |
| 14 | Philadelphia, Pennsylvania | American Philosophical Society | Acquired from the Library of Congress in 1901 in a trade for Benjamin Franklin's Passy imprint of The Boston Independent Chronicle "Supplement." | |
| 15 | Philadelphia, Pennsylvania | Historical Society of Pennsylvania | Fragment including the first 32 lines, thought to be likely an uncorrected proof, from the Frank M. Etting collection; Etting asserted it was this document that had been read in public. However, Charles Henry Hart wrote in 1900: "The endorsement is in the handwriting of the late Frank M. Etting, who died insane, one of the most inexact and inaccurate of collectors." | |
| 16 | Philadelphia, Pennsylvania | Independence National Historical Park | Previously owned by Col. John Nixon, appointed by the sheriff of Philadelphia to read the Declaration of Independence to the public on July 8, 1776, in the State House yard; presented to the park by his heirs in 1951. | |
| 17 | Dallas, Texas | Dallas Public Library | "The Leary Copy" discovered in 1968 amid the stock of Leary's Book Store of Philadelphia, Pennsylvania, in a crate that had been unopened since 1911. Ira G. Corn Jr. and Joseph P. Driscoll of Dallas bought the manuscript on May 7, 1969. A group of 17 people later sold it to the Dallas city government. | |
| 18 | Charlottesville, Virginia | University of Virginia | 1/2. Found in 1955 in an attic in Albany, New York, where it had been used to wrap other papers. Bought by Charles E. Tuttle Company of Rutland, Vermont; later sold to David Randall, who sold it in 1956 to the university. | |
| 19 | Charlottesville, Virginia | University of Virginia | 2/2. "The H. Bradley Martin Copy"; exhibited at the Grolier Club in 1974; sold on January 31, 1990, to Albert H. Small, who gave it to the university. | |
| 20 | Washington, D.C. | Library of Congress, Rare Book and Special Collections Division | Acquired in 1867 as part of the purchase of documents assembled by Peter Force. | |
| 21 | Washington, D.C. | Library of Congress, Manuscripts Division, Washington Papers | Fragment copy with 54 lines; thought to be the copy George Washington read to the troops on July 9, 1776, in New York. | |
| 22 | Washington, D.C. | National Archives | Inserted into the Continental Congress manuscript journal, previously attached with a seal. | |
| 23 | Roving copy | Norman Lear | Found in the back of a picture frame bought at a yard sale for $4.00 at an Adamstown, Pennsylvania flea market; now owned by a consortium which included Norman Lear; sold in 2000 for $8.14 million; previously sold for $2.42 million on June 4, 1991. | |
| 24 | London, United Kingdom | The National Archives, Colonial Office Papers | General William Howe and Vice Admiral Richard Howe from the flagship Eagle, off Staten Island, sent this copy with a letter dated August 11, 1776, which states, "A printed copy of this Declaration of Independency came accidentally to our hands a few days after the dispatch of the Mercury packet, and we have the honor to enclose it." | |
| 25 | London, United Kingdom | The National Archives, Admiralty Papers | Vice Admiral Richard Howe sent this copy from the flagship Eagle, then "off Staten Island" with a letter dated July 28, 1776. | |
| 26 | London, United Kingdom | The National Archives, Colonial Office Papers | Discovered in box of documents in 2009. Provenance identified from 2022-2025, as that of Jonas Phillips, who attempted to ship it to the Netherlands before it was confiscated by British customs. | |

=== July 1776 Exeter Broadside ===
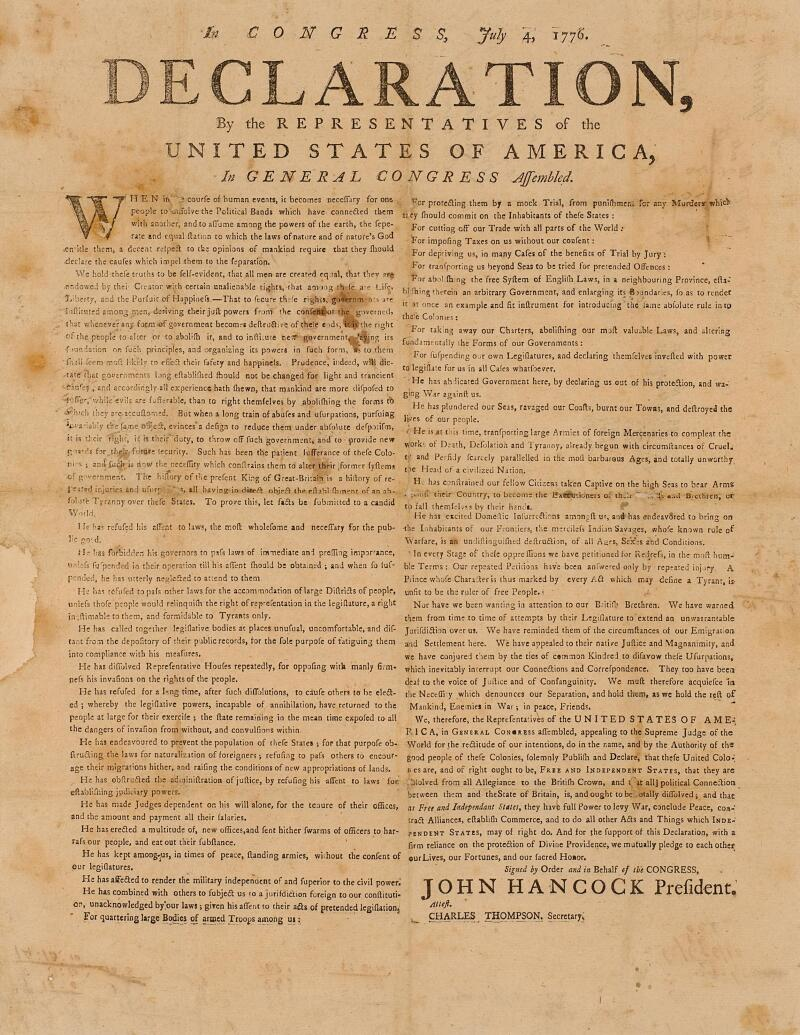
Exeter Broadside

Shortly after the Dunlap Broadsides were printed on the night of 4 July, Hancock had the broadside copies distributed to the colonies by horseback over the course of three weeks, whereupon the text of the Declaration was distributed state by state, newspaper by newspaper.

In Exeter, New Hampshire, printmaker Robert Luist Fowle, a Loyalist, and editor of the New Hampshire Gazette, printed the text both on the newspaper and as a separate broadside on 16 July 1776. Though a stark contrast to his ideology, Fowle ran forward with the print to accommodate the demand of local residents.

The Exeter print consisted of two columns, amongst the seven of thirteen broadside designs to utilize this format, though it utilized italic font rather than the Dunlap's standard.

In addition, the first printing of the printing misspelled John Hancock and Charles Thomson's names as "Hacock" and "Thompson". His second printing corrected Hancock's name but not Thomson.

Eleven specimens of the Exeter Broadside are known to have survived, that mostly reside in various institutions in the USA.

In 22 April 2021, a copy of the second edition, known as the Goodspeed-Streeter-Sang print sold for $930,000 USD at Christie's, and subsequently appeared on Sotheby's on 24 January 2025, selling for $2.4 million.

On 23 January 2026, another copy, passed down through a New Hampshire family, sold for $5.687 million at Christie's. It was discovered in an attic in 1980, and was sold at another Sotheby's New York auction on 3 December 2000.

In May 2026, volunteer Michael Scurr at the UK National Archives in Kew, London, while going through the letters of Thomas Fitzherbert, an 18th-century Royal Navy captain of the 68-gun ship HMS Raisonable, discovered a copy of the Exeter printing captured from the 18-gun Dalton, a ship under the direction of the Continental Congress, with orders signed by its president, John Hancock. This discovery makes it the 11th known copy of the Exeter edition.

=== Goddard broadside ===
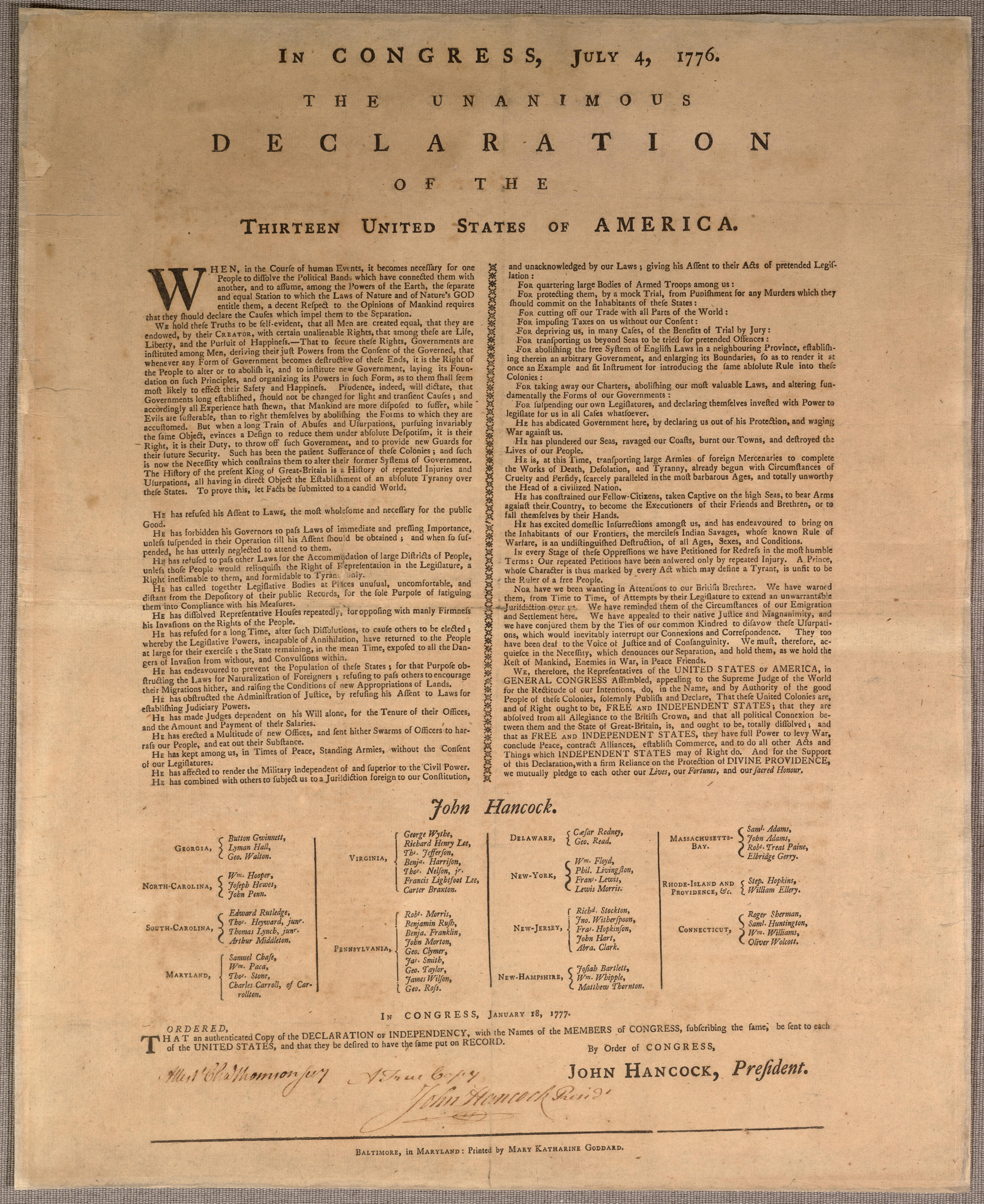
The Goddard broadside.

In January 1777, Congress commissioned Mary Katherine Goddard to print a new broadside that, unlike the Dunlap broadside, lists the signers of the Declaration. With the publication of the Goddard broadside, the public learned for the first time who had signed the Declaration. One of the eventual signers of the Declaration, Thomas McKean, is not listed on the Goddard broadside, suggesting that he had not yet added his name to the signed document at that time.

In 1949, nine Goddard broadsides were known to still exist. The reported locations of those copies at that time were these:

1. Library of Congress (Washington, D.C.)
2. Connecticut State Library (Hartford, Connecticut)
3. Library of the late John W. Garrett
4. Maryland Hall of Records (Annapolis, Maryland)
5. Maryland Historical Society (Baltimore, Maryland)
6. Massachusetts Archives (Dorchester, Massachusetts)
7. New York Public Library (New York, New York)
8. Library Company of Philadelphia (Philadelphia, Pennsylvania)
9. Rhode Island State Archives (Providence, Rhode Island)

=== Other broadsides ===
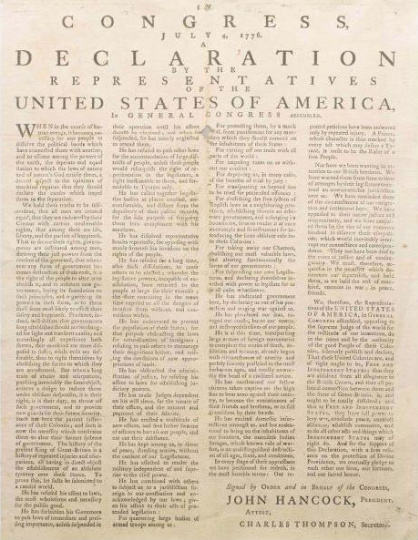
A rare four-column broadside at Lauinger Library, Georgetown University.

In addition to the broadsides authorized by Congress, many states and private printers also issued broadsides of the Declaration, using the Dunlap broadside as a source. In 1949, an article in the Harvard Library Review surveyed all the broadsides known to exist at that time and found 19 editions or variations of editions, including the Dunlap and Goddard printings. The author was able to locate 71 copies of these various editions.

A number of copies have been discovered since that time. In 1971, a copy of a rare four-column broadside probably printed in Salem, Massachusetts was discovered in Georgetown University's Lauinger Library. In 2010, there were media reports that a copy of the Declaration was located in Shimla, India, having been discovered sometime during the 1990s in a book bought from the Viceroy's library. The type of copy was not specified.

== Parchment copies ==
=== The Matlack Declaration ===
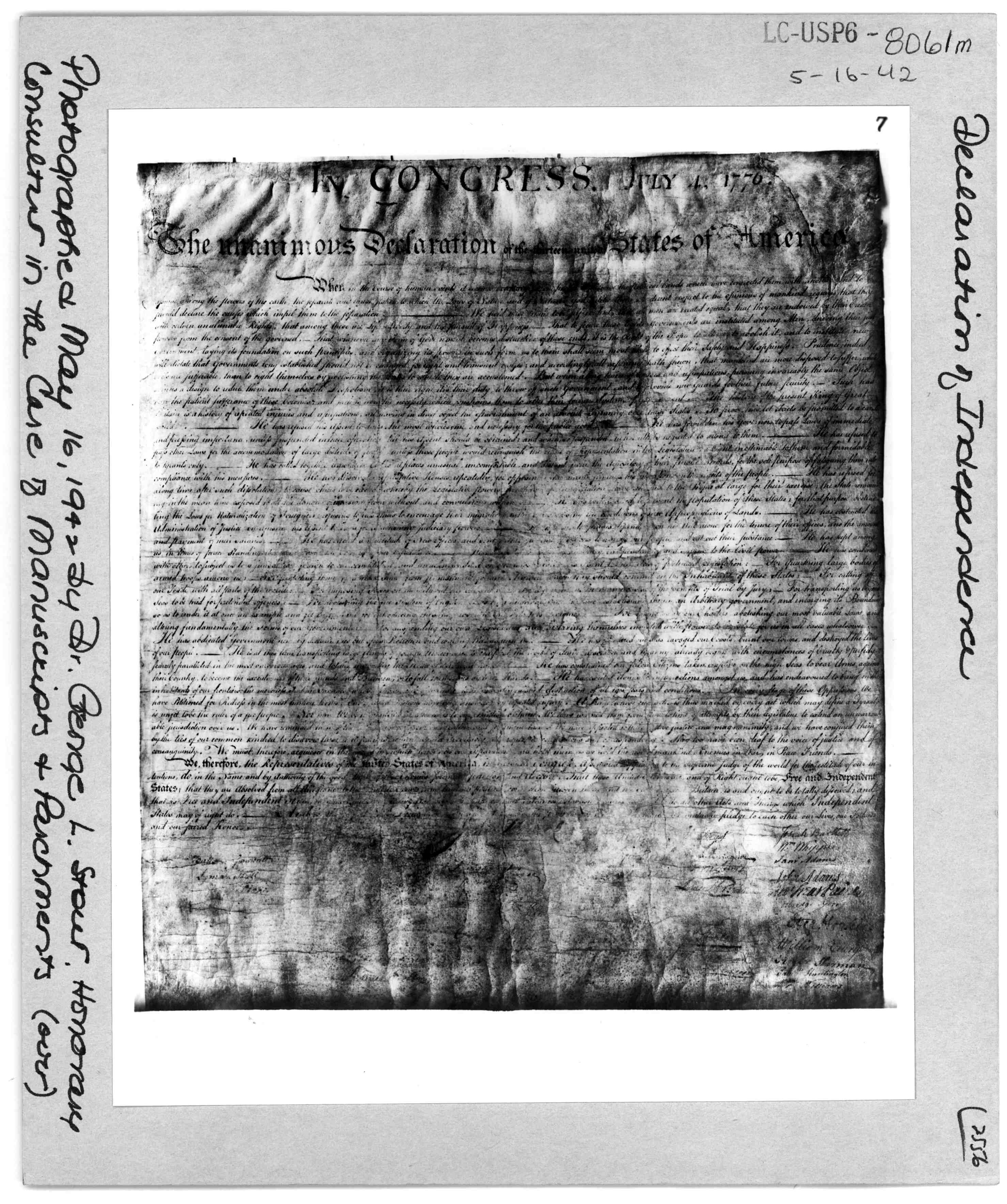
The deteriorating Declaration of Independence in May, 1942, while being protected at Fort Knox during World War II

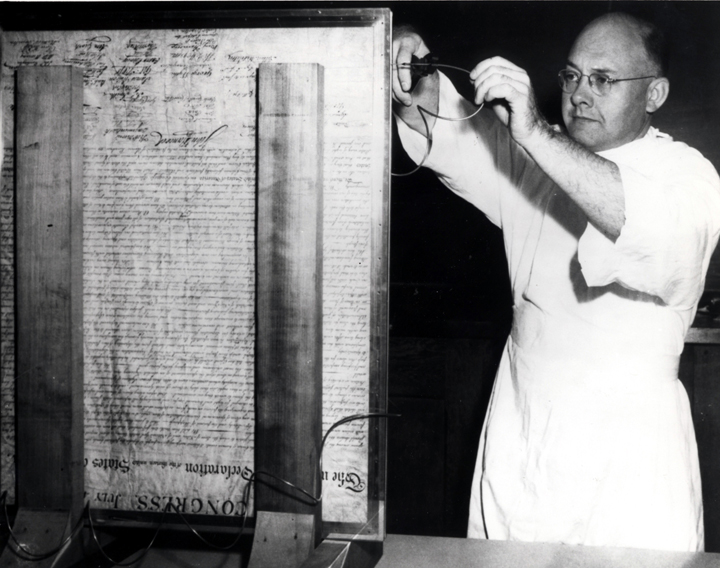
National Bureau of Standards preserving the engrossed copy of the Declaration of Independence in 1951

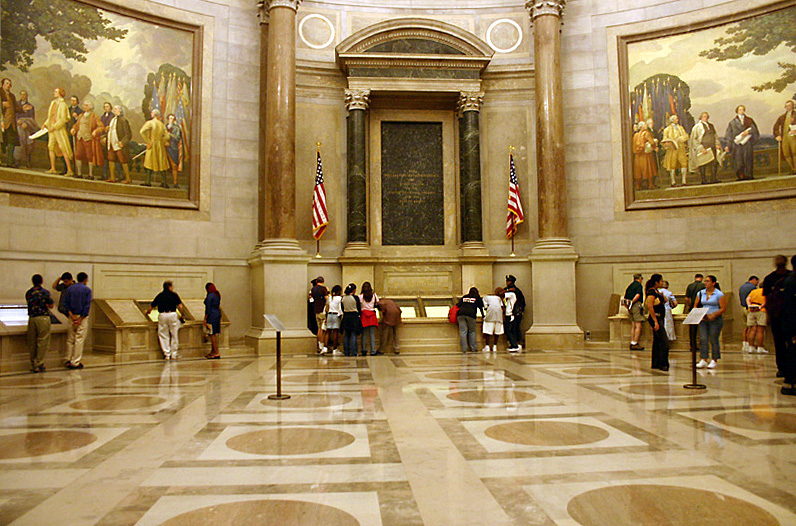
The National Archives' Rotunda for the Charters of Freedom where, between two Barry Faulkner murals, the original United States Declaration of Independence, United States Constitution, and other American founding documents are publicly exhibited

The copy of the Declaration that was signed by Congress is known as the engrossed or parchment copy. This copy was probably handwritten by clerk Timothy Matlack, and given the title of "The unanimous Declaration of the thirteen united States of America". This was specified by the Congressional resolution passed on July 19, 1776:

Resolved, That the Declaration passed on the 4th, be fairly engrossed on parchment, with the title and stile of "The unanimous declaration of the thirteen United States of America," and that the same, when engrossed, be signed by every member of Congress.

Throughout the Revolutionary War, the engrossed copy was moved with the Continental Congress, which relocated several times to avoid the British army. In 1789, after creation of a new government under the United States Constitution, the engrossed Declaration was transferred to the custody of the secretary of state. The document was evacuated to Virginia when the British attacked Washington, D.C. during the War of 1812.

After the War of 1812, the symbolic stature of the Declaration steadily increased even though the engrossed copy's ink was noticeably fading. In 1820, Secretary of State John Quincy Adams commissioned printer William J. Stone to create an engraving essentially identical to the engrossed copy. Stone's engraving was made using a wet-ink transfer process, where the surface of the document was moistened, and some of the original ink transferred to the surface of a copper plate, which was then etched so that copies could be run off the plate on a press. When Stone finished his engraving in 1823, Congress ordered 200 copies to be printed on parchment. Because of poor conservation of the engrossed copy through the 19th century, Stone's engraving, rather than the original, has become the basis of most modern reproductions. 48 of the documents produced by Stone are known to still exist as of 2021; one was sold at auction for $4,420,000 on July 1, 2021.

From 1841 to 1876, the engrossed copy was publicly displayed on a wall opposite a large window at the Patent Office building in Washington, D.C. Exposed to sunlight and variable temperature and humidity, the document faded badly. In 1876, it was sent to Independence Hall in Philadelphia for exhibit during the Centennial Exposition, which was held in honor of the Declaration's 100th anniversary, and then returned to Washington the next year. In 1892, preparations were made for the engrossed copy to be exhibited at the World's Columbian Exposition in Chicago, but the poor condition of the document led to the cancellation of those plans and the removal of the document from public exhibition. The document was sealed between two plates of glass and placed in storage. For nearly 30 years, it was exhibited only on rare occasions at the discretion of the Secretary of State.

In 1921, custody of the Declaration, along with the United States Constitution, was transferred from the State Department to the Library of Congress. Funds were appropriated to preserve the documents in a public exhibit that opened in 1924. After the Japanese attack on Pearl Harbor in 1941, the documents were moved for safekeeping to the United States Bullion Depository at Fort Knox in Kentucky, where they were kept until 1944.

For many years, officials at the National Archives believed that they, rather than the Library of Congress, should have custody of the Declaration and the Constitution. The transfer finally took place in 1952, and the documents, along with the Bill of Rights, are now on permanent display at the National Archives in the "Rotunda for the Charters of Freedom". Although encased in helium, by the early 1980s the documents were threatened by further deterioration. In 2001, using the latest in preservation technology, conservators treated the documents and transferred them to encasements made of titanium and aluminum, filled with inert argon gas. They were put on display again with the opening of the remodeled National Archives Rotunda in 2003.

=== The Sussex Declaration ===
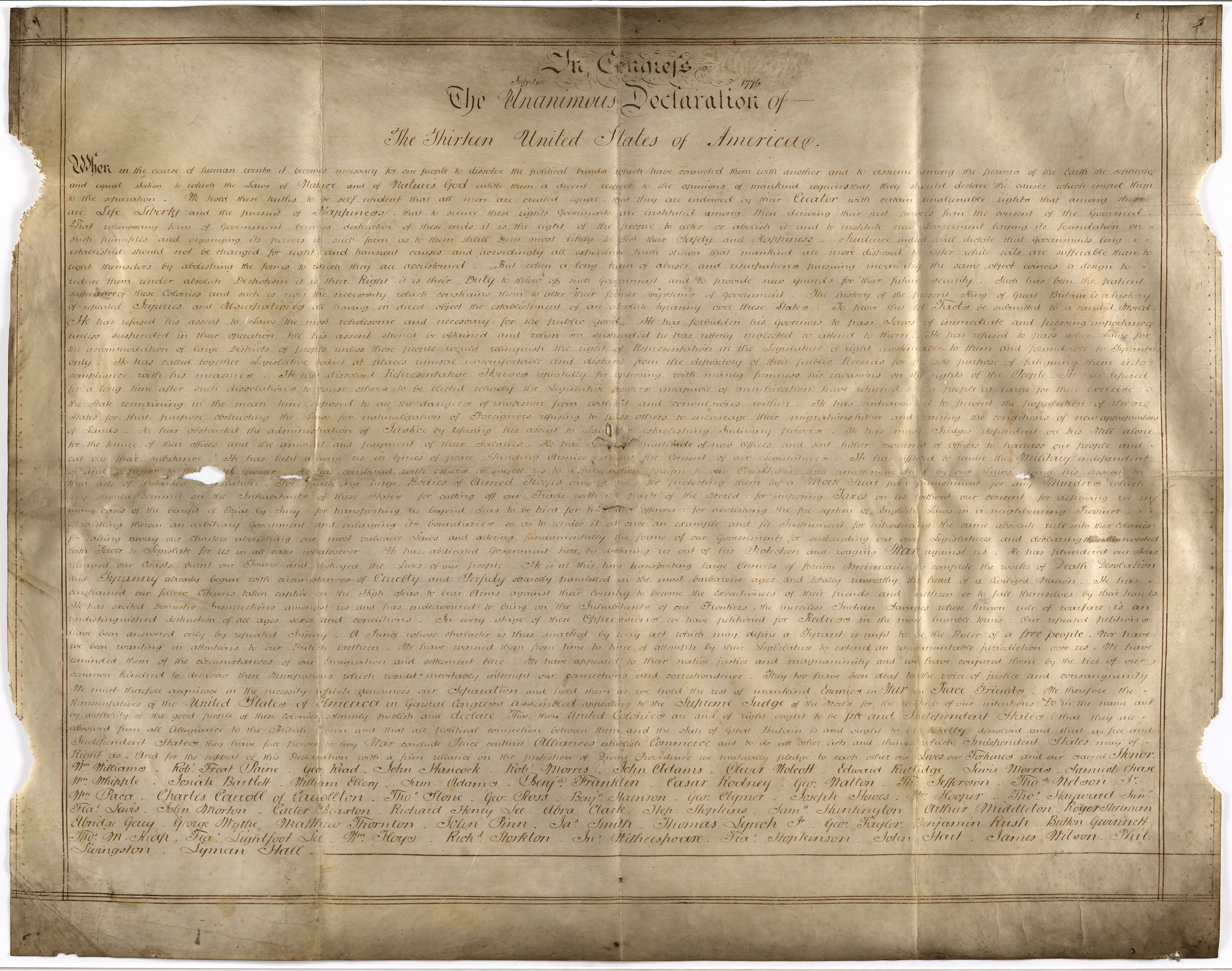
The Sussex Declaration in Chichester

On April 21, 2017, the Declaration Resources Project at Harvard University announced that a second parchment manuscript copy had been discovered at West Sussex Record Office in Chichester, England. Named the "Sussex Declaration" by its finders, Danielle Allen and Emily Sneff, it differs from the National Archives copy (which the finders refer to as the "Matlack Declaration") in that the signatures on it are not grouped by States. How it came to be in England is not yet known, but the finders believe that the randomness of the signatures points to an origin with signatory James Wilson, who had argued strongly that the Declaration was made not by the States but by the whole people. The Sussex Declaration was probably brought to Sussex, England by Charles Lennox, 3rd Duke of Richmond, known as the 'radical duke'.

The finders identify the Sussex Declaration as a transcription of the Matlack Declaration, probably made between 1783 and 1790 and likely in New York City or possibly Philadelphia. They propose that the Sussex Declaration "descended from the Matlack Declaration, and it (or a copy) served, before disappearing from view, as a source text for both the 1818 Tyler engraving and the 1836 Bridgham engraving".

=== The Jones Declaration ===
In or around 1788, Samuel Jones of New York hand-copied the full text of the Declaration of Independence. This manuscript appears within the earliest known complete manuscript of the 1777 New York State Constitution (the only state constitution to incorporate the Declaration's text in full). Jones, a delegate to the New York Ratification Convention, likely used or referenced it there while advocating for the inclusion of a bill of rights in the U.S. Constitution. The document features marginal notations in his hand and was bound into a volume of New York laws.

It was discovered in the early 21st century in a deaccessioned library book and sold at auction in 2025. It is the only eighteenth-century manuscript of the Declaration of Independence known to be held privately.

== See also ==
- The Pennsylvania Evening Post, the first newspaper to print the Declaration, on July 6, 1776
- Syng inkstand, used by the delegates to sign the Declaration
- Printing of the United States Constitution
- List of most expensive books and manuscripts
