= Leary's Book Store =

Former bookstore in Philadelphia

Coordinates: 39.9509°N 75.1551°W

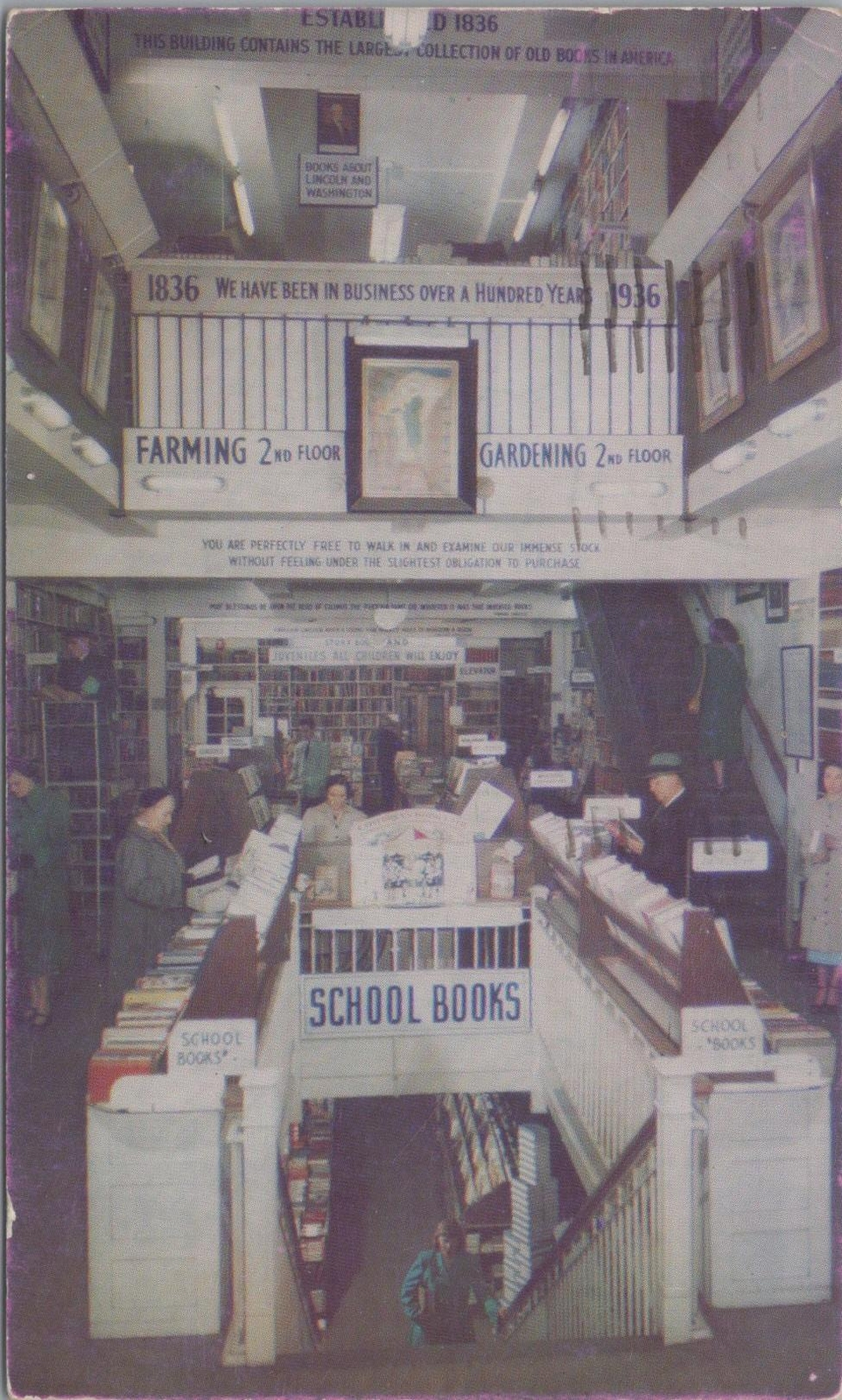
Interior of Leary's Book Store in 1952

Leary's Book Store was a landmark in downtown Philadelphia, Pennsylvania, for nearly one hundred years. In 1969, when it closed, it was known as the “oldest book store in the United States.”

== Business ==
Leary's Book Store was in the business of buying and selling used books. It purchased large collections of books from private libraries and offered them individually for sale. It claimed to have "twenty thousand square feet of books, representing nearly five hundred thousand volumes."

There is evidence Leary's Book Store also published books, such as:

- The Talmud: Selections from the Contents of that Ancient Book, Its Commentaries, Teachings, Poetry, and Legends. Also, Brief Sketches of the Men who made and commented upon it. Translated from the Original By H. Polano, Philadelphia: Leary's Book Store, 1876.
- Leary's Ready Reckoner: Form Book & Wages Calculator. Philadelphia: Leary, Stuart & Co., 1904.

== Location ==
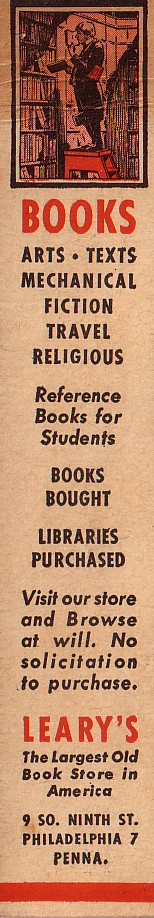
Leary's Book Store bookmark.

Leary's Book Store was located in the heart of the downtown district of Philadelphia at 9 South 9th Street, a short distance from Market Street.

The very large Gimbel's Department Store occupied the corner of 9th and Market, and the relatively tiny Leary's Book Store on 9th Street was separated from it by a small cobble stoned alleyway.

Leary's Book Store was contained in a large three-story building with basement and sloped roof. The building consisted of three floors and a basement full of books. On the third floor, an opening in the floor allowed a view of the mezzanine down below.

Additional books were placed outside on shelves on the Leary's side of the alleyway separating it from Gimbels. Some provision was made to shelter the books and the readers in the alley way, but, most of the time, the books and browsers, suffered the inclemency of the outdoor Philadelphia weather.

Throughout the building, numerous used books were everywhere: on wall shelves and piled high on tables for readers to browse through. The policy of the bookstore was not to interfere with readers and browsers, but simply to direct customers to their areas of interest if asked.

== History ==
In 1836, William A. Leary established a sidewalk book stall on North Second Street in Philadelphia, in close proximity to the Old Market, eventually acquiring a location at No. 158.

After the death of Leary, the business was acquired in 1876 by Edwin S. Stuart and Charles Mann and eventually renamed Leary, Stuart, and Co. Stuart moved the business to 9 South Ninth Street in September 1877 to benefit from the relocation of the city government.

Leary's heyday was during the Golden Age of Books, a period during the 19th century and the first half of the 20th century when books were the key source of entertainment and enlightenment.

After World War II consumers for books moved to suburbia where competing book stores and distance to Leary's resulted in a declining demand for Leary's used books.

The bookstore closed on 20 November 1968 because the shift of population to the suburbs diminished its customer base.

During the final cataloging of its remaining book stock for sale at the Freeman auction house, a number of ancient documents, reported to have languished in the stock for 100 years or more, were found among its contents, including an original broadside of the Declaration of Independence dated to 1776. This proved to be a John Dunlap first printing and it sold for over $400,000 at auction. The buyers, two wealthy Texas businessmen, donated it to the city of Dallas, Texas; it is now on permanent display at the Dallas Public Library.

Leary's Book Store and the adjoining Gimbels department store, originally acquired by Gimbels in 1894, were demolished by the late 1970s. Various redevelopment proposals for the site have failed and the ground has been used mostly as a parking lot.

== Advertising ==
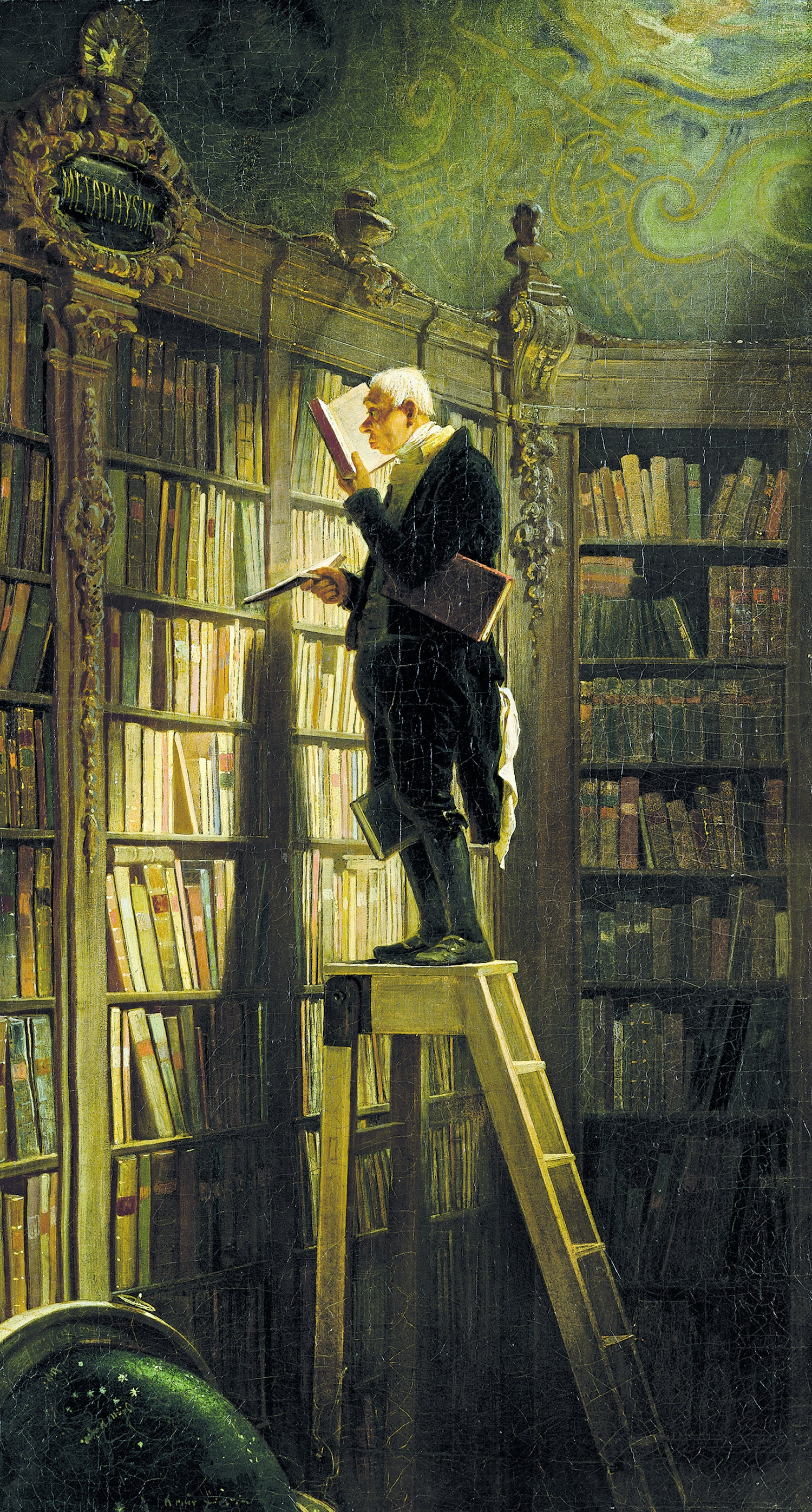
The Carl Spitzweg image strongly associated with Leary's Book Store.

Leary's Book Store tied its advertising to The Bookworm, an 1850 painting by the German painter and poet Carl Spitzweg. The owners had the picture repainted on the outside of the store for the Centennial Exhibition to attract visitors.

A cropped portion of this painting, showing the bookworm on a ladder, was used in Leary's advertising and commercial signage.

Customers and visitors were routinely given bookmarks containing this image as well as informative posters related to the bookstore and its history.

== See also ==
- Old City, Philadelphia, Pennsylvania
