= ConstitutionDAO =

Decentralized autonomous organization created to purchase a copy of the U.S. Constitution

ConstitutionDAO was a decentralized autonomous organization (DAO) formed in November 2021 to purchase an original copy of the United States Constitution. The group raised $47 million in Ether cryptocurrency, but lost to a bid of $43.2 million in the Sotheby's auction. The organization was disbanded later that month.

== Auction and refunds ==
ConstitutionDAO raised $47 million in Ether cryptocurrency, but lost to a bid of $43.2 million in the Sotheby's auction made by Kenneth C. Griffin. The organizers of ConstitutionDAO believed that they would have had insufficient funding to "insure, store, and transport the document" if they had made a higher bid.

The organizers said they would refund contributions, minus Ethereum fees. Weeks after the event, around $23 million had yet to be refunded, partly due to these fees, with one contributor reported as having to pay $70 in fees to donate $200, and another $70 to get it refunded. The median contributor had donated $217 to the project, and some fees were more than the value of the donation.

The Verge put the group's effort in the lineage of Internet movements like the GameStop short squeeze earlier that year. Bloomberg News wrote that the effort "showed the power of the DAO ... has the potential to change the way people buy things, build companies, share resources and run nonprofits."

== ConstitutionDAO2 ==
Another group of crowdfunders named ConstitutionDAO2 formed in 2022 to purchase a different copy of the original constitution, which was to be auctioned by Sotheby's. The group had only publicly raised $313,000 by the time Sotheby's postponed its December 2022 auction, though the organization had also raised private funds. The group considered an offer to buy another edition of the constitution from the same printing press.
