= Committee of Detail =

U.S. Constitutional Convention committee

The Committee of Detail was a committee established by the United States Constitutional Convention on July 24, 1787, to put down a draft text reflecting the agreements made by the convention up to that point, including the Virginia Plan's 15 resolutions. The convention adjourned from July 26 to August 6 to await their report. Much of what was contained in the final document was present in this draft.

The committee was chaired by John Rutledge, with the other members including Edmund Randolph, Oliver Ellsworth, James Wilson, and Nathaniel Gorham. Although the membership of the committee disproportionately favored the larger states, it was fairly evenly balanced in terms of geographic distribution: Gorham (Massachusetts) representing northern New England, Ellsworth (Connecticut) representing lower New England, Wilson (Pennsylvania) representing the middle states, Randolph (Virginia) representing the upper South, and Rutledge (South Carolina) representing the lower South.

Overall, the report of the committee conformed to the resolutions adopted by the convention, though on many clauses the members of the committee left the imprint of their individual and collective judgments. In a few instances, the committee avowedly exercised considerable discretion. For example, the committee added the phrase "giving them aid and comfort" to the section on treason to narrow the definition from more ambiguous phrases which had been proposed in the convention.

They also added an Electoral College.

This committee, in preparing its draft of a Constitution, referenced the state constitutions, the Articles of Confederation, plans submitted to the convention, and other available material. Although the Constitution was an innovation of national government with federal characteristics, much of it was drawn from models of Classical Antiquity and the British governmental tradition of mixed government. The Declaration of Independence also acted as an important guide for its summation of ideals of self-government and fundamental human rights. The writings of such European political philosophers as Montesquieu and John Locke were influential. What they sought to create was a balanced government of checks and balances to serve the long-term interests of the people of an independent nation.

The two preliminary drafts that survive, as well as the text of the Constitution submitted to the convention, were in the handwriting of Wilson or Randolph.

== Purpose ==
Randolph's statement in the preamble of the committee's report is often cited as evidence for the proposition that the Constitution was deliberately written to be broad and flexible to accommodate social or technological change over time:

In the draught of a fundamental constitution, two things deserve attention:

1. To insert essential principles only; lest the operations of government should be clogged by rendering those provisions permanent and unalterable, which ought to be accommodated to times and events: and
2. To use simple and precise language, and general propositions, according to the example of the constitutions of the several states.

This decision to use "simple and precise language, and general propositions," such that the Constitution could "be accommodated to times and events," is often cited as the "genius" of the Constitutional framers, and is one of the main arguments for the Living Constitution framework.

== Proceedings ==
Though the committee did not record its minutes, it is known that the committee used the original Virginia Plan, the decisions of the convention on modifications to that plan, and other sources, to produce the first full draft. Much of what was included in this draft consisted of details, such as powers given to Congress, that hadn't been debated nor been included in any other plan before the convention. Most of these were uncontroversial and unchallenged, and as such much of what Rutledge's committee included in this first draft made it into the final version of the constitution without debate. They decided mostly on issues that hadn't been deliberated but weren't likely to be contested.

Historian David Stewart calls the committee's work "the most important single undertaking of the summer" and that it required "precision where agreement was clear, equivocation where it had been elusive." He also notes that "missing parts would have to be drafted, ambiguities dispelled, the whole thing knitted into a coherent document," and that "from one perspective, their draft was a remarkable cut-and-paste job" because it copied provisions from the Articles of Confederation, the convention resolutions, and even Charles Pinckney's plan. However, Stewart argues that "they did much more, they added provisions that the convention never discussed, they changed critical agreements that the delegates had already approved. Spurred by Rutledge, they reconvened the powers of the national government, redefined the powers of the states, and adopted fresh concessions on that most explosive issue, slavery. It is not too much to say that Rutledge and his committee hijacked the constitution. Then they remade it."

Other than Gorham, the committee members had all been lawyers of distinction, and would be leading legal figures in the new government. They had all known each other as delegates to the Confederation Congress, and had seen its weaknesses first hand. Other than Randolph, they had all been in the congress when its fiscal problems became acute. They had already played important roles in the convention: Randolph presented the Virginia Plan, Rutledge and Wilson had been key to crafting the compromise on representation, Ellsworth had led the small states during the battle over per-state voting in the senate, and Gorham had chaired the Committee of the Whole where he called for compromise during the bitter debate over representation. Stewart states, "they had been more than merely active, they had been constructive." Stewart argues, "Rutledge knew what he wanted: a weaker central government," and that the draft produced by the committee reflected his goals.

Since the committee didn't leave a record of its proceedings, its story has to be pieced together from three documents: an outline by Randolph with edits by Rutledge, extensive notes and a second draft by Wilson with edits by Rutledge, and the final report presented to the convention. Stewart argues "this evidence places the drafting pen in the hands of those three men". The outline began with two rules for drafting: that the constitution should only include essential principles, avoiding minor provisions that would change over time, and that it should be stated in simple and precise language. Wilson's draft included the first attempt at what would become the preamble in the final document.

Beginning with Randolph's outline, the committee added numerous provisions that the convention had never discussed, but which were not likely to be controversial. Examples include the speech and debate clause and provisions organizing the house and senate. Three of the committee's changes fundamentally reconstituted the national government. The first change replaced the open-ended grant of powers to Congress with a list of enumerated powers. This was due to Rutledge, who wanted a strong national government but not one with indefinite powers. Many of these eighteen enumerated powers came from the Articles of Confederation. By this, the committee made the new national government one of limited powers, despite opposition among most delegates.

Rutledge was not able to completely convince Wilson, who was hostile to states rights and wanted a stronger national government. Wilson thus modified the list of enumerated powers, notably by adding the Necessary and Proper Clause. He also strengthened the Supremacy Clause. These changes set the final balance between the national and state governments that would be a part of the final document, as the convention never challenged this dual-sovereignty between nation and state established by Rutledge and Wilson. The final report of this committee, which became the first draft of the constitution, was the first workable constitutional plan, as Madison's Virginia Plan had simply been an outline of goals and a broad structure. Even after it issued this report, the committee continued to meet off and on until early September. Further changes were made by the convention and other committees.

On September 8, 1787, a Committee of Style with different members was impaneled to set down and revise the actual text of the Constitution. This committee included William Samuel Johnson (Connecticut), Alexander Hamilton (New York), Gouverneur Morris (Pennsylvania), James Madison (Virginia), and Rufus King (Massachusetts).

== See also ==
- Founding Fathers of the United States
- Signers of the United States Constitution
- Printing of the United States Constitution
- Committee of Five, drafted the US Declaration of Independence
