= Donald Frank Rose =

American writer (1890–1964)

- Born: June 29, 1890; Somerset, England
- Died: February 7, 1964 (aged 73); Meadowbrook, Pennsylvania, United States
- Occupation: Columnist
- Spouse: Marjorie Wells
- Parent(s): Frank Hodson Rose; Mary Anne Harriette Searle
- Relatives: Neil Genzlinger (grandson)

Donald Frank Rose (June 29, 1890 – February 7, 1964) was an American newspaper columnist, lecturer, and author.

== Early life and education ==
Rose was born on June 29, 1890 to Frank Hodson Rose and Mary Anne Harriette Searle Rose, in Street, Somerset, England. At age 14, he went to work as a clerk at a brewery in Surrey, until the time of his emigration to the United States in 1908. At the age of seventeen, he entered an essay contest run by the English magazine The Reader. For his speculations on what the world would be like in the year 2000, he won a prize of two dollars and fifty cents.

His plan in emigrating to the United States was to study to become a minister in the New Church, as his great-grandfather James Shirley Hodson had been. He crossed the Atlantic Ocean in the autumn of 1908 on the USS Saint Paul. His path to the ministry entailed finishing his secondary education the Academy of the New Church Secondary Schools, receiving an undergraduate degree at the affiliated college, and then continuing into the seminary. After two years of study for the ministry, he gave up that ambition. At that point he turned instead to teaching and writing to support his growing family; on June 13, 1914, he had married Marjorie Wells, and over the next 17 years they had twelve children. One of his 86 grandchildren is New York Times culture critic Neil Genzlinger.

== Career ==
Rose began his career teaching high school English and Latin while he was a still a student in theological school. By 1916, he was giving instruction in Hebrew as well. During his years of teaching, he pursued additional education at Columbia University and Oxford University. He continued teaching until 1924, at which point he launched out on his own as a freelance writer.

He began publishing his own magazine, Stuff and Nonsense, in 1925, of lighthearted and humorous reflections on the challenges of day-to-day life. He also wrote articles for The American Magazine, Cosmopolitan, The Saturday Evening Post, and a number of other magazines.

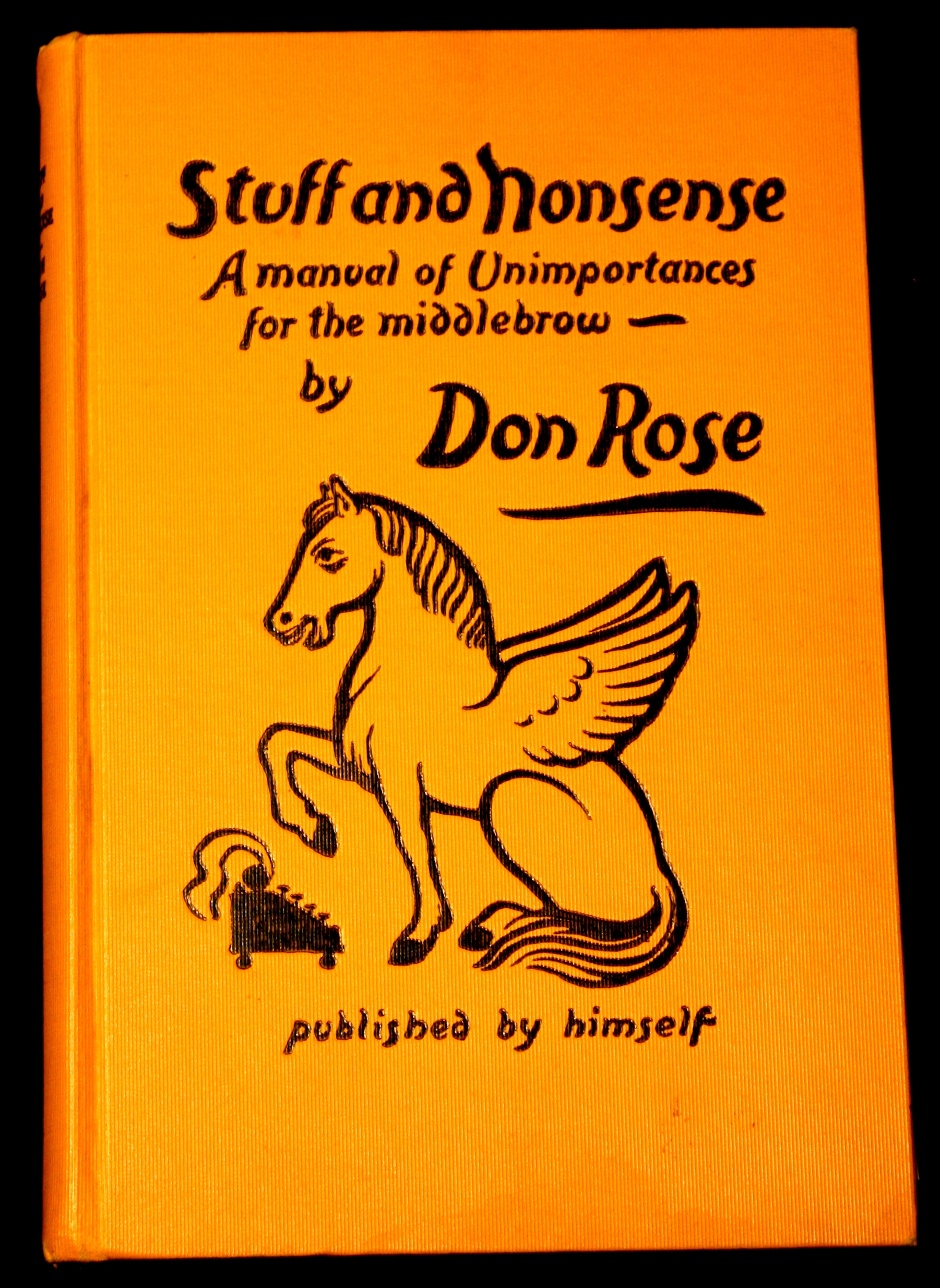
The cover of Don Rose's 1927 book, Stuff and Nonsense.

In 1927, Stuff and Nonsense became a weekly column for the Sunday Public Ledger in Philadelphia. At about the time that its morning and Sunday editions merged with The Philadelphia Inquirer, the column went to daily in the Evening Public Ledger. When the latter ceased publication in 1942, Rose's column moved to the Philadelphia Bulletin, which was at the time the largest afternoon daily in the country. Stuff and Nonsense appeared on the op-ed page and Rose was also sometimes asked to write unsigned editorials on the editorial page. He continued his column at the Bulletin until his death in 1964. Between 1927 and 1951, he published 8 books, several of them being collections of his newspaper columns.

At the end of World War II, he was sent by the Bulletin to survey the aftermath of the destruction. This resulted in a number of columns and his book Diary of a Postwar Correspondent. His wife observed that this experience left him shaken and weakened him for rest of his life.

In his later years, Rose taught journalism courses at Columbia, Pennsylvania State University, Temple University, and the Charles Morris Price School of Advertising and Journalism.

Rose died on February 7, 1964, in Meadowbrook, Pennsylvania.

== Publications ==
=== Books ===
- Stuff and Nonsense: A Manual of Unimportances for the Middlebrow. 1927.
- Wings of Tomorrow The Story of The Autogiro (with Juan de la Cierva). New York: Brewer, Warren and Putnam, 1931.
- Hardy Perennial. 1937.
- Mother Nature Knows Best. Philadelphia: Westbrook Publishing, 1940.
- My Own Four Walls. New York: Doubleday, Doran & Co., 1941.
- Mr. Wicker's War. Philadelphia: Macrae Smith Company, 1943.
- The Diary of a Postwar Correspondent. 1945.
- Full House. Philadelphia: J. B. Lippincott & Co., 1951.
- Leary's of Philadelphia. Leary's Book Store, c.1964.

=== Selected articles ===
- "Table Talk: The Pessimism of Protoplasm," Forum: The Magazine of Controversy, vol. 80, no. 3, September 1928.
- "This Book Collecting Game," North American Review, February 1929.
- "The Great American Editorial," Forum: The Magazine of Controversy, vol. 82, no. 5, November 1929.
