= Neil Genzlinger =

American dramatist

- Occupations: Playwright, editor, critic
- Children: 2
- Relatives: Donald Frank Rose (grandfather)

Neil Genzlinger is an American playwright, editor, and critic who is known for his work at The New York Times.

== Personal life ==
Genzlinger is a grandson of the late Philadelphia Bulletin columnist Donald Frank Rose. He has two children.

== Career ==
Genzlinger began working for The New York Times as a television critic in 2000. Prior to that, he was an editor for the publication. He retired in 2023. His reviews shifted toward theater and television related to disabilities, such as the plays Syndrome, Autism: The Musical, and Push Girls.

=== Seinfeld "really" debate ===
In one review, Genzlinger criticized television writers for what he perceived as their overuse of the word "really," claiming that "it's undoing 2,000 years' worth of human progress." In response, comedian Jerry Seinfeld wrote in a letter to Genzlinger: "OK, fine, when it's used in scripted media, it is a little lazy. But comedy writers are lazy. You're not fixing that. So, here's the bottom line. If you're a writer, fine, don't use it. But in conversation it is fun to say." Seinfeld had previously performed "a 'Saturday Night Live Weekend Update' segment titled 'Really!?!' with Seth Meyers".

Julie Miller, for Vanity Fair, observed that Seinfeld was motivated by having been "one of the most successful perpetrators of the term" criticized by Genzlinger, and concluded by wondering "what other polarizing topics might inspire Jerry Seinfeld to immediately write a personal letter to a journalist". Erik Hayden, for Time, observed that Genzlinger's original opinion piece "seems like an argument that could have been taken as a decent point made", but saw Seinfeld's point. CNN's Maane Khatchatourian called the letter "amusingly outraged," noting the timing of its publication just prior to Seinfeld's comedy tour.
