= John Dunlap =

Printer of the first copies of the US Declaration of Independence

- Born: August 21, 1746; Strabane, County Tyrone, Ireland
- Died: 27 November 1812 (aged 66); Philadelphia, Pennsylvania, U.S.
- Resting place: Christ Church Burial Ground; 39.9523434°N 75.1480767°W
- Occupations: Printer, newspaper publisher; land owner
- Known for: Printing the first copies of the United States Declaration of Independence
- Spouse: Elizabeth Hayes Ellison
- Military career
- Allegiance: United States
- Branch: United States Army
- Service years: –1794
- Rank: Major
- Unit: First Troop Philadelphia City Cavalry
- Conflicts: American Revolutionary War: Battle of Trenton; Battle of Princeton; Whiskey Rebellion

John Dunlap (21 August 1746 – 27 November 1812) was an early American printer who emigrated from Ulster, Ireland and who printed the first copies of the United States Declaration of Independence and was one of the most successful Irish/American printers of his era. He served in the Continental Army under George Washington during the American Revolutionary War.

== Biography ==
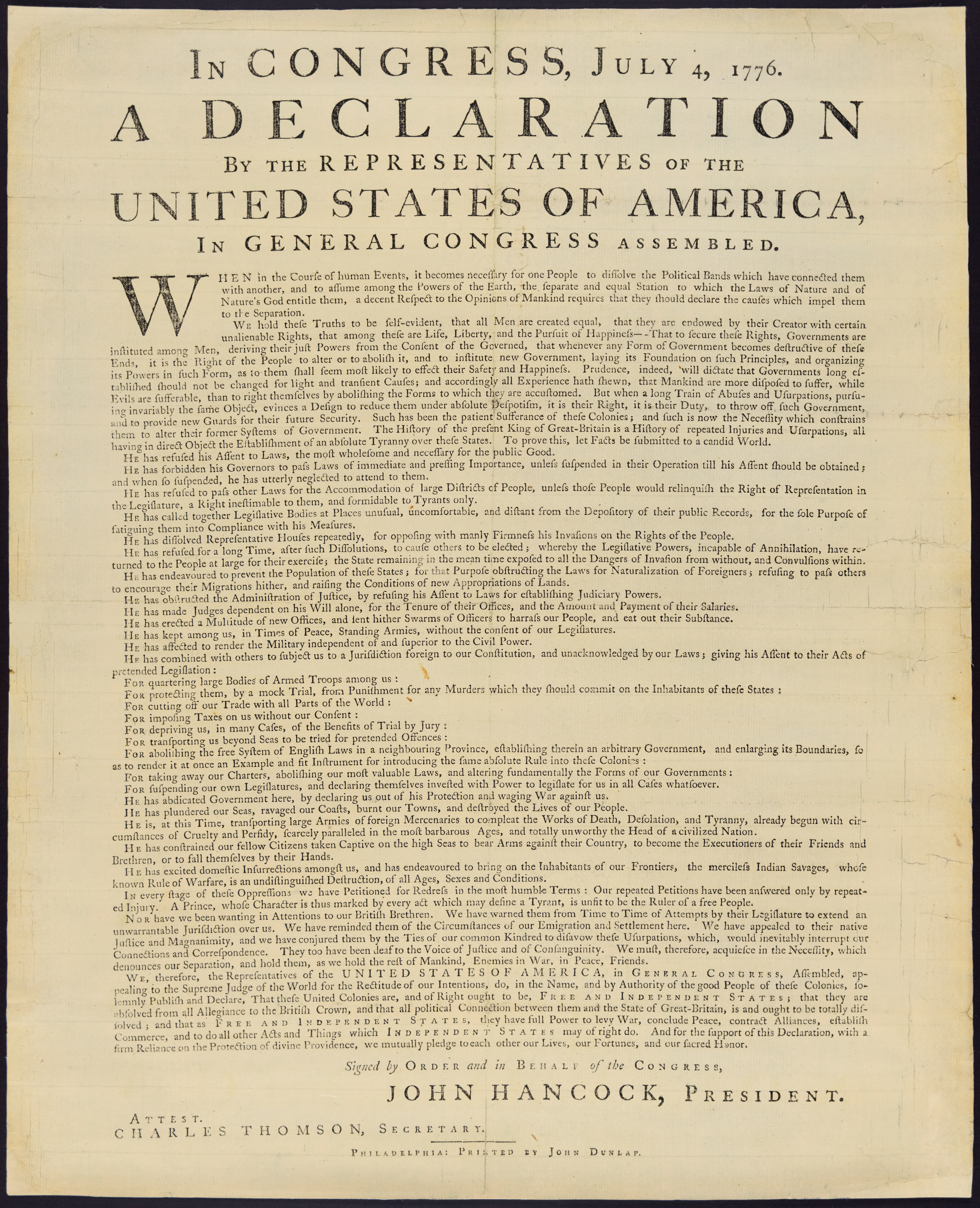
Dunlap broadside copy of the United States Declaration of Independence

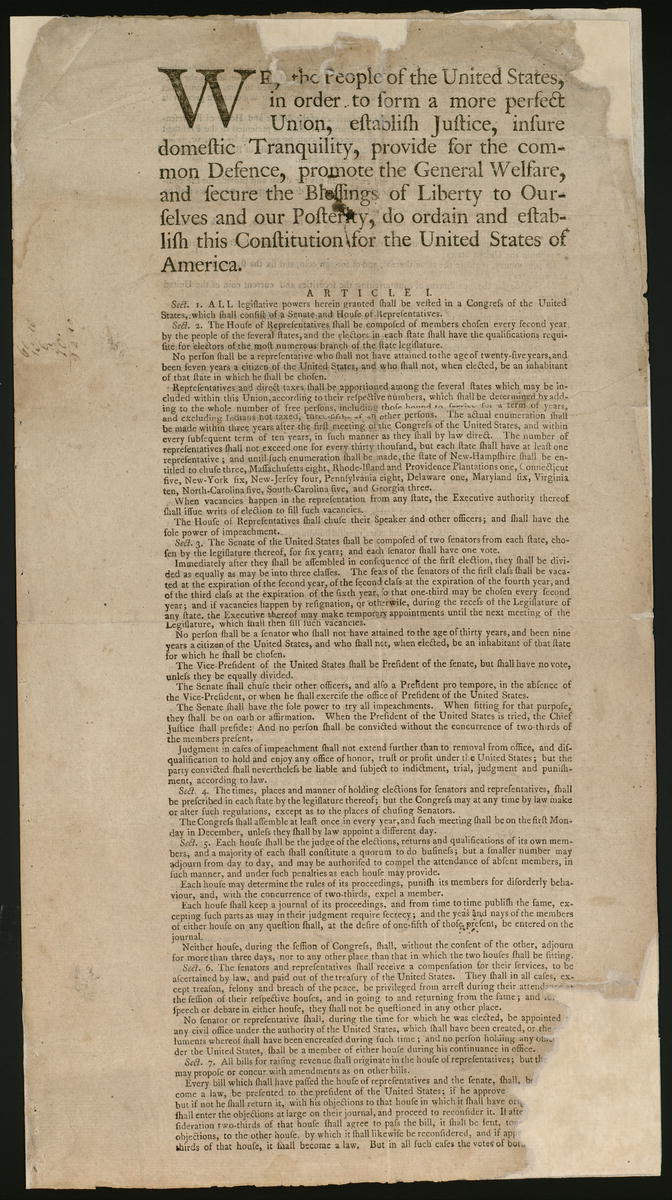
Original broadside printing of the United States Constitution by Dunlap & Claypoole, 1787

Dunlap was born in Strabane, County Tyrone, Ireland on August 21, 1746. When he was ten years old, he went to work as an apprentice to his uncle, William Dunlap, a printer and bookseller in Philadelphia. In 1766, William Dunlap left the business in the care of his nephew. John eventually bought the business, and at first made a living by printing sermons and probably broadsides and handbills too. In November 1771, Dunlap, with David C. Claypool began the publication of the Pennsylvania Packet, or General Advertiser, a weekly newspaper. From 1791 to 1793 Dunlap was the sole publisher, but in the following year Claypoole again became a partner until December, 1795, when Dunlap finally withdrew. In 1773 he married Elizabeth Hayes Ellison.

During the American Revolutionary War, Dunlap became an officer in the First Troop Philadelphia City Cavalry, and saw action with George Washington at the battles of Trenton and Princeton. He continued in the First City Troop after the war, rising to the rank of major, and leading Pennsylvania's cavalry militia to help suppress the Whiskey Rebellion in 1794.

In 1776, Dunlap secured a lucrative printing contract for the Continental Congress. In July 1776, fighting between the American colonists and the British forces had been going on for over a year. On 2 July, the Second Continental Congress voted on the Lee Resolution to secede. Two days later, they approved the final wording of a public declaration regarding their decision, which we today call the Declaration of Independence. President of Congress John Hancock signed the fair copy with Secretary of Congress Charles Thomson attesting it. That evening Hancock ordered Dunlap to print broadside copies of the declaration. Dunlap printed perhaps 200 broadsides, since known as the Dunlap broadsides, which were the first published versions of the Declaration.

Dunlap also printed items for Pennsylvania's revolutionary government. In 1777 he took over the printing of the Journals of the Continental Congress from Robert Aitken, but lost the contract in 1779 after printing in his newspaper a letter from Thomas Paine that leaked news of the secret French aid to the Americans.

In 1784, Dunlap's paper became a daily with a new title: the North American and United States Gazette. It was not the first daily in the United States—The Pennsylvania Evening Post was the first in 1783—but it became the first successful daily. Within the same year that Dunlap began printing his daily, he was elected a member of the American Philosophical Society.

Continuing to serve the changing needs of the government, Dunlap and his partner David Claypoole printed the Constitution of the United States 19 September 1787 for use by the Constitutional Convention, and later published it for the first time in The Pennsylvania Packet.

Dunlap's major financial success came from real estate speculation. During the American Revolution, he bought property confiscated from Loyalists who refused to take Pennsylvania's new loyalty oath. After the war, he bought land in Kentucky. By 1795, when he was forty-eight, he was able to retire with a sizable estate. He died in Philadelphia.

== See also ==
- Early American publishers and printers
- List of early American publishers and printers

== Bibliography ==
- Lee, James Melvin (1923). History of American journalism. Boston, New York, Houghton Mifflin Company. ( Alternative publication )
- Malone, Dumas (1935). Dictionary Of American Biography (cushman Eberle). Vol. V. Oxford University Press.
- Thomas, Isaiah (1874). The history of printing in America, with a biography of printers. Vol. I. New York, B. Franklin.
- Wilson, James Grant; Fiske, John, eds. (1887). Appleton's Cyclopædia of American Biography. Vol. II. New York, D. Appleton and Company.
