= The Pennsylvania Evening Post =

American newspaper, 1775-1784

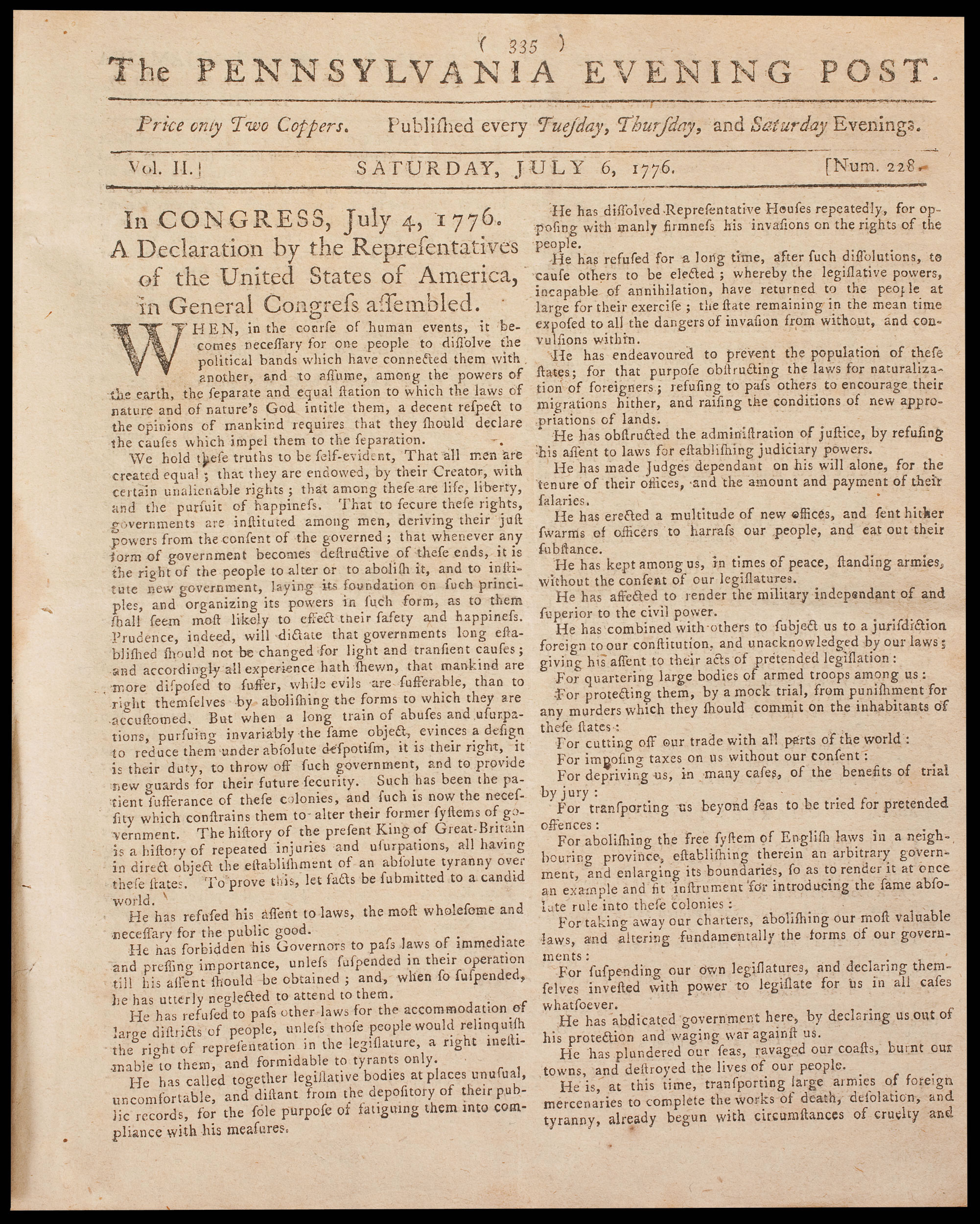
On July 6, 1776, the Post became the first newspaper to print a copy of the United States' Declaration of Independence, which was unanimously adopted by the Second Continental Congress two days earlier, on July 4, inside present-day Independence Hall in Philadelphia

The Pennsylvania Evening Post was the first daily newspaper published in the United States, and was produced by Benjamin Towne from 1775 to 1784. It was also the first newspaper to report on the Lee Resolution and to publish the United States Declaration of Independence.

== History ==
Benjamin Towne published the first issue of the Post on January 24, 1775, using paper borrowed from James Humphreys without expectation of payment. The paper was supportive of the cause of the American Revolution, and was the first to publish the United States Declaration of Independence, with it taking up the front page of the July 6, 1776 issue.

Towne initially published his newspaper three times per week on Tuesday, Thursday and Saturday evenings "on half a sheet of crownpaper, in quarto." The cost to readers was "two pennies each paper, or three Shillings the quarter." His printing business was located on Front Street near the London Coffee House in Philadelphia.

During the British occupation of Philadelphia in 1778, the paper's ideology shifted towards loyalism. Other loyalist papers in the city, such as Humphrey's Pennsylvania Ledger, ceased publication as the British were losing control of Philadelphia; Towne stayed. As a result of his loyalist publication, the Supreme Executive Council of the Commonwealth of Pennsylvania placed him on a list of traitors. Towne's Post was selected to publish this list of traitors, possibly because other printers had not returned to the city.

In 1779, the Post published a series of articles written by Whitehead Humphreys, under the pseudonym "Cato." Humphreys's articles attacked the Pennsylvania Constitution of 1776 and accused Thomas Paine of being a loyalist. On July 24, supporters of the Constitutional Society, led by Charles Willson Peale, dragged Towne to a meeting and demanded the identity of Cato. Towne named Humphreys, and the mob attacked Humphreys's house.

These controversies lead to a decrease in revenue. In 1780, Towne began advertising for hawkers. The paper started daily publication in spring of 1783, the first in the country to do so. The paper would continue publication in this format until 1784; reportedly, near the end of its run, Towne personally hawked the paper.

In June 2013, David Rubenstein, chief executive officer of The Carlyle Group, purchased a copy of the first newspaper printing of the Declaration of Independence for $632,500 during an auction at the Robert A. Siegel Galleries in New York. At the time, it was the highest price ever paid at auction for a historic newspaper, according to Reuters. Rubenstein subsequently loaned his copy of the newspaper to the Newseum in Washington, D.C. , where it was on exhibit from July 2016 until the Newseum's closing at the end of 2019.

== See also ==
- Early American publishers and printers
- Physical history of the United States Declaration of Independence
