= Broadside (printing) =

Historical printing format; large sheet of paper printed on one side only

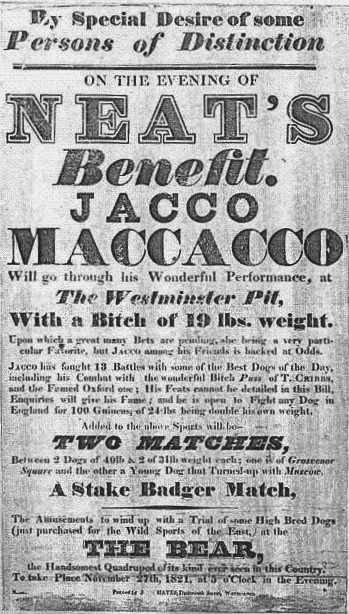
A broadside advertising an event on 27 November 1821 at the Westminster Pit, London, a well-known blood-sport arena, featuring a fight between the monkey, Jacco Macacco and a dog, also dog fights, badger-baiting and bear-baiting

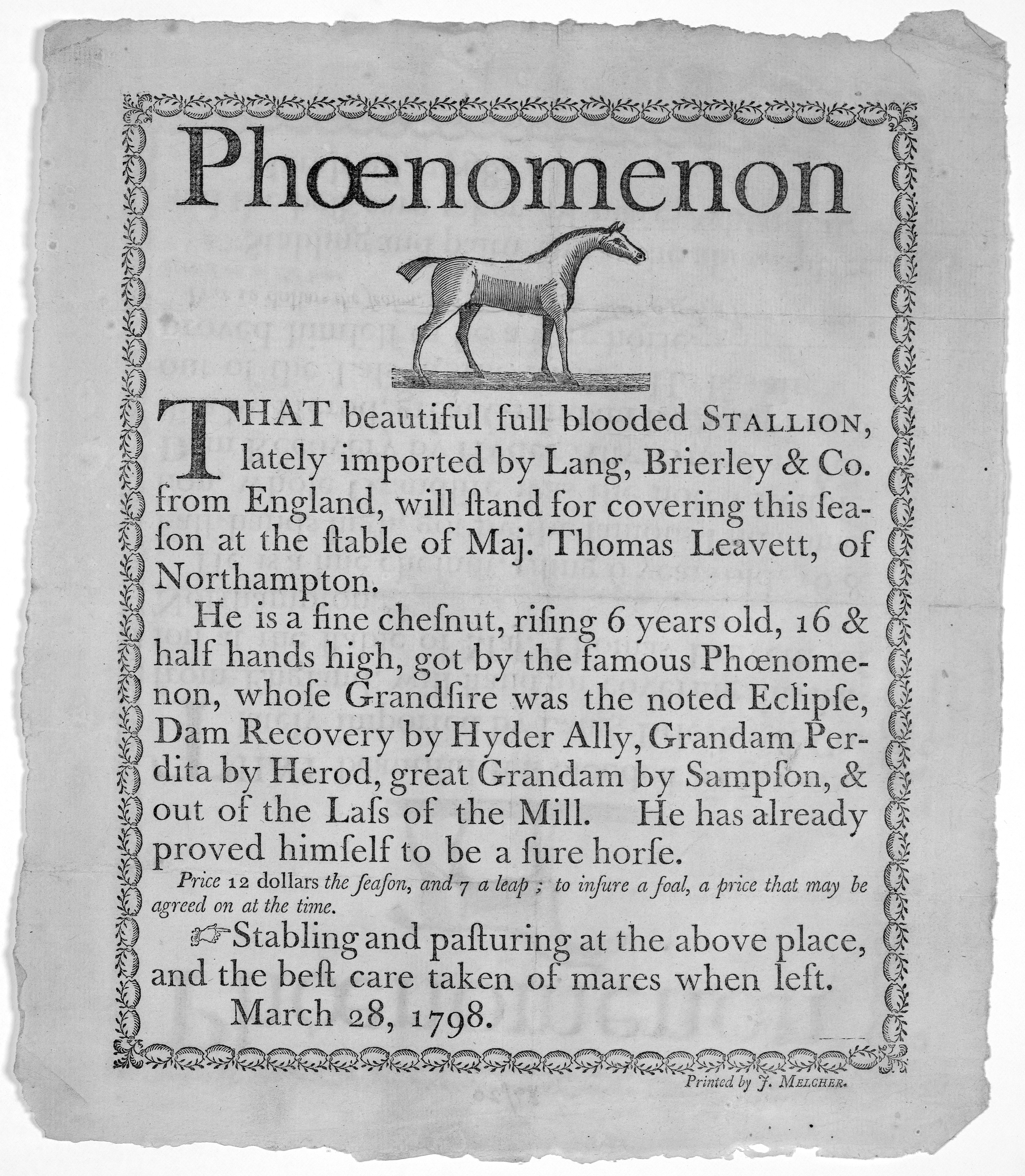
1798 broadside advertising 'Phœnomenon', stables of Maj. Thomas Leavett, Northampton, Massachusetts

A broadside is a large sheet of paper printed on one side only. Historically in Europe, broadsides were used as posters, announcing events or proclamations, giving political views, commentary in the form of ballads, or simply advertisements. In Japan, chromoxylographic broadsheets featuring artistic prints were common.

== Description and history ==
The historical type of broadsides, designed to be plastered onto walls as a form of street literature, were ephemera, i.e., temporary documents created for a specific purpose and intended to be thrown away. They were one of the most common forms of printed material between the sixteenth and nineteenth centuries. They were often advertisements, but could also be used for news information or proclamations.

Broadsides were a very popular medium for printing topical ballads starting in the 16th century. Broadside ballads were usually printed on the cheapest type of paper available. Initially, this was cloth paper, but later it became common to use sheets of thinner, cheaper paper (pulp). In Victorian era London they were sold for a penny or half-penny. The sheets on which broadsides were printed could also be folded, twice or more, to make small pamphlets or chapbooks. Collections of songs in chapbooks were known as garlands. Broadside ballads lasted longer in Ireland, and although never produced in such huge numbers in North America, they were significant in the eighteenth century and provided an important medium of propaganda, on both sides, in the American War of Independence.

Broadsides were commonly sold at public executions in the United Kingdom in the 18th and 19th centuries, often produced by specialised printers. They could be illustrated by a crude picture of the crime, a portrait of the criminal, or a generic woodcut of a hanging. There would be a written account of the crime and of the trial and often the criminal's confession of guilt. A doggerel verse warning against following the criminal's example, to avoid his fate, was another common feature.

By the mid-19th century, the advent of newspapers and inexpensive novels resulted in the demise of the street literature broadside.

One classic example of a broadside used for proclamations is the Dunlap broadside, which was the first publication of the United States Declaration of Independence, printed on the night of July 4, 1776 by John Dunlap of Philadelphia in an estimated 200 copies. Another was the first published account of George Washington's crossing of the Delaware River, printed on December 30, 1776, by an unknown printer. In nineteenth-century Pennsylvania, broadsides were used by the Pennsylvania Dutch to advertise the "vendu", or county sale, for religious instruction, and to publish Trauerlieder or "sorrow songs" for sale.

Today, broadside printing is done by many smaller printers and publishers as a fine art variant, with poems often being available as broadsides, intended to be framed and hung on the wall. Broadsides pasted on walls are still used as a form of mass communication in Haredi Jewish communities, where they are known by the Yiddish term "pashkevil" (pasquil). Originally, they were used to ridicule public authority figures, to publicly criticize the powerful, and to publish concealed information.

== See also ==
- Broadsheet
- Street Literature
- Poster
- Dunlap broadside
- Broadside ballad
- Phoenix Broadsheets
