= Matlack =

Matlack is a surname, and may refer to:

- Ann Matlack, American politician
- James Matlack (1775-1840), Representative from New Jersey
- Jesse Matlack (1821–1893), American politician from Pennsylvania
- Jon Matlack (born 1950), Major League Baseball pitcher
- Ruth Matlack (born 1931), All-American Girls Professional Baseball League player
- Timothy Matlack (c.1730-1829), merchant, surveyor, architect, statesman and patriot in the American Revolution
- White Matlack (1745-1824), New York Quaker and abolitionist
