= Jacob Shallus =

American calligrapher (1750–1796)

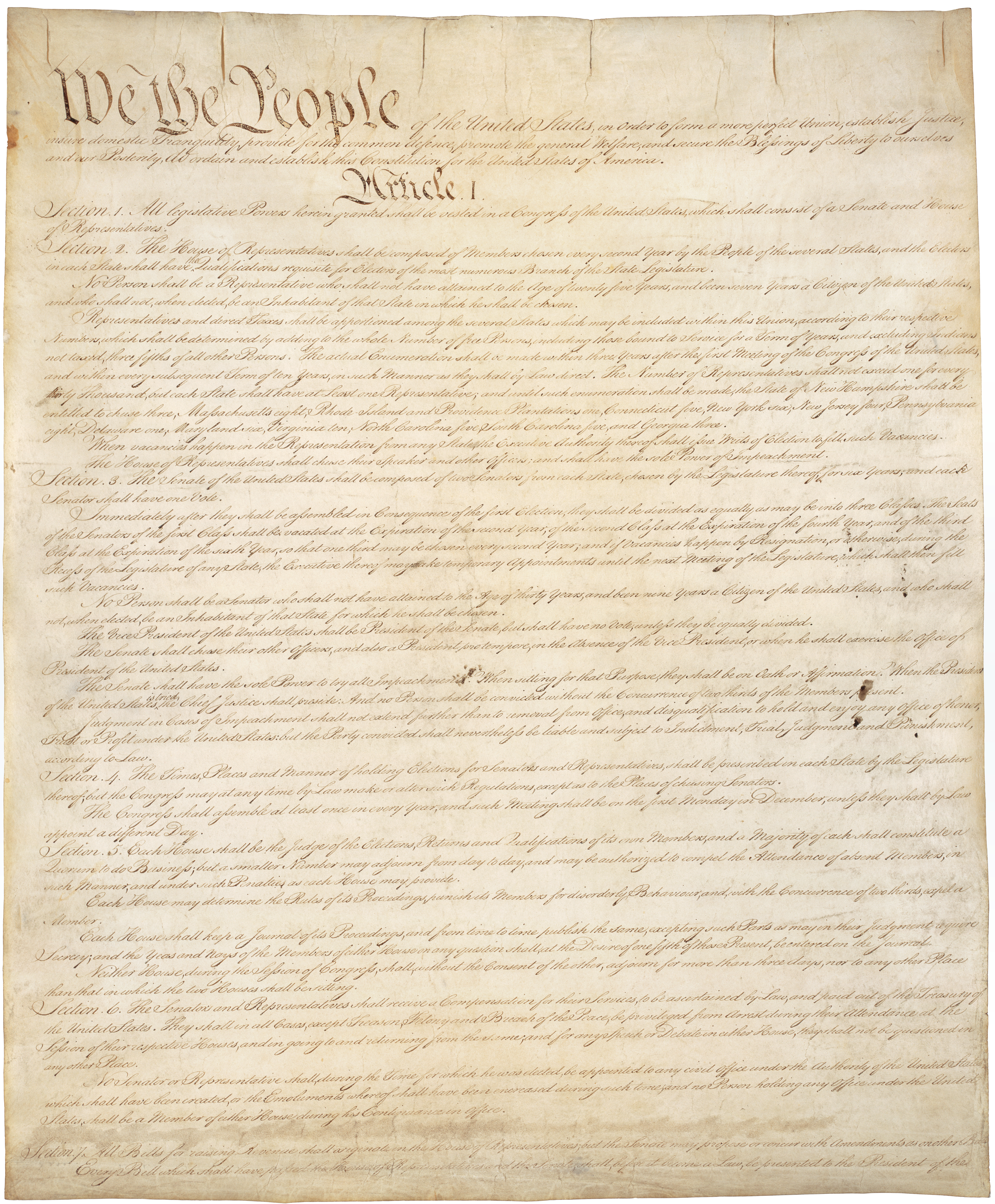
In 1787, Shallus handwrote the original presentation of the United States Constitution.

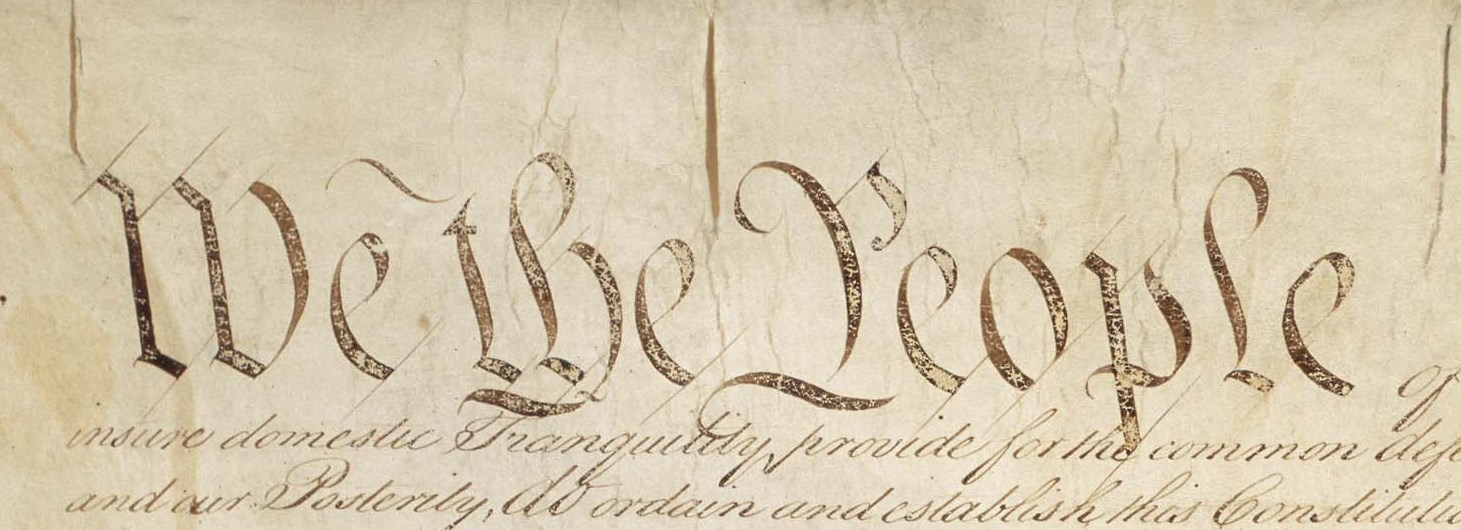
Shallus's engrossed presentation of the constitution's preamble

Jacob Shallus or Shalus (1750–April 18, 1796) was an American calligrapher who was the engrosser or penman of the original copy of the United States Constitution. The handwritten document that Shallus engrossed is on display in the Rotunda of the Charters of Freedom at the National Archives Building in Washington, D.C.

== Early life ==
Shallus was the son of German immigrants. His father was an innkeeper named Valentine Schallus who immigrated from Palatine region in 1747 and his mother was Frederica Catherina. His brother Thomas Shallus was a mapmaker.

He was born a year after his father Valentine immigrated to Pennsylvania and was a volunteer in the Revolutionary War. During the Revolutionary War, Shallus fought in Canada after becoming a quartermaster of Pennsylvania's 1st Battalion on January 19, 1776. Shallus also assisted in the outfitting of a privateering vessel, the Retrieve.

== Career ==
At the time of the Constitutional Convention in Philadelphia, Shallus served as Assistant Clerk to the Pennsylvania General Assembly, which met at the Pennsylvania State House, today known as Independence Hall. The convention's desire for speedy drafting and Shallus' convenience to the convention's meeting may have influenced his choice as engrosser.

Shallus' name appears nowhere on the document itself, but an investigation into the identity of the Penman in 1937 for the 150th anniversary of the Constitution revealed the identity of the transcriber. Shallus was paid $30 (equivalent to US$767 in 2025) for his engrossing work, a sum recorded as for "clerks employed to transcribe & engross." The effort consisted of copying the Constitution on four sheets of parchment made from treated animal skin (either calf, goat, or sheep; in 1987 the supervising conservator at the National Archives said, "We don't know which") and measuring 28 3/4 inches by 23 5/8 inches, probably with a goose quill and with ink made of iron filings in oak gall that was black when applied but that has now turned brownish. Shallus engrossed the entire document except for the list of states at the end of the document, which are in Alexander Hamilton's handwriting.

Shallus is also credited as Assistant Secretary in the 1790 re-authoring of the State Constitution of Pennsylvania.

== Personal life ==
Shallus married Elizabeth Melchor, sister to Col. Isaac Melcher, Barrack-Master-General of the Continental Army, in Pennsylvania on September 21, 1771. Her obituary from the Democratic Press in Pennsylvania from August 3, 1818 notes she was "one of those patriotic Ladies of Philadelphia who first associated together and supplied the suffering soldiers with shirts, stockings, &c. in that eventful period of the revolution, which tried and apalled [sic] even men's souls."

Jacob and Elizabeth had at least one child that survived to adulthood, their eldest son, Francis Shallus who was born in 1774. Francis Shallus became an engraver after apprenticing under Robert Scot, the 1st Chief Engraver of the U.S. Mint. In 1800, Francis married Ann Peters in Germantown, Philadelphia. Together they opened a circulating library in Philadelphia that “specialized in popular fiction, particularly romances, as well a sprinkling of classics.” This library became one of the earliest of such establishments to encourage both men and women to congregate.

== See also ==
- History of the United States Constitution
- Timothy Matlack, engrosser of the 1776 United States Declaration of Independence
- William Lambert, engrosser of the United States Bill of Rights
- Bibliography of the United States Constitution
