= Free Quakers =

Christian denomination in the United States

The Religious Society of Free Quakers, originally called "The Religious Society of Friends, by some styled the Free Quakers," is a small branch of Quakerism, a historically Protestant Christian denomination.

It was established on February 20, 1781 in Philadelphia, Pennsylvania. More commonly known as Free Quakers, the Society was founded by members of the Religious Society of Friends, or Quakers, who had been expelled for failure to adhere to the Peace Testimony during the American Revolutionary War. Many of its early members were prominent Quakers involved in the American Revolution before the society was established.

Notable Free Quakers at the early meetings included Samuel Wetherill, who served as clerk and preacher; Timothy Matlack and his brother White Matlack; William Crispin; Colonel Clement Biddle and his brother Owen Biddle; Benjamin Say; Christopher Marshall; Joseph Warner; and Peter Thompson. Other notable Free Quakers include Lydia Darragh and Betsy Ross.

Following the end of the American Revolutionary War, the number of Free Quakers began to dwindle as some members died and others were either accepted back into the Society of Friends or by other religious institutions. The final meeting of the Free Quakers was held in 1836. There is a small group of Free Quakers in Indiana who continue the tradition of the Five Principles (Inner Light, peace, simplicity, justice, stewardship) and the Five Freedoms (from creeds, from clergy, from public worship, from organized membership, from evangelization). Today, the descendants of the original Free Quakers hold an annual meeting of the Religious Society of Free Quakers at the Free Quaker Meetinghouse in Philadelphia, Pennsylvania.

== See also ==
- Universal Friends, which included many ex-Quakers sympathetic to the revolution with whom Free Quakers worked.
