= William Lambert (writer) =

Lambert's handwritten original of the United States Bill of Rights

William Lambert (died 1834) was the Engrosser or Penman of the United States Bill of Rights whose handwritten copy of the Bill of Rights is displayed in the Rotunda of the Charters of Freedom in the US National Archives.

William Lambert served as a congressional clerk at the time of the drafting of the Bill of Rights. Born in Virginia, he worked as a clerk at the United States Department of State from 1790 to 1792 and became acquainted with Thomas Jefferson. Lambert was also an avid astronomer and later advocated for the establishment of a national astronomical observatory.

During the 1820s, Lambert was a member of the prestigious society, Columbian Institute for the Promotion of Arts and Sciences, who counted among their members former presidents Andrew Jackson and John Quincy Adams and many prominent men of the day, including well-known military representatives, government service persons, medical practitioners, and practitioners of other professions.

== See also ==
- Jacob Shallus, engrosser of the 1787 United States Constitution
- Timothy Matlack, engrosser of the United States Declaration of Independence
- A More Perfect Union, 1989 film
- Constitution Day (United States)
- Constitution of the United States
- History of the United States Constitution
- History of the United States
- National Constitution Center
- United States Bill of Rights
