= Quakers in the American Revolution =

By the mid-18th century, members of the Religious Society of Friends lived throughout the thirteen British colonies in North America, with large numbers in the Pennsylvania colony in particular. The American Revolution created a difficult situation for many of these Friends, informally known as "Quakers", as their nonviolent religious tenets often conflicted with the emerging political and nationalistic ideals of their homeland. Early in the conflict's history, Quakers participated in the revolutionary movement through nonviolent actions such as embargoes and other economic protests. However, the outbreak of war created an ideological divide among the group, as most Quakers remained true to their pacifist beliefs and refused to support any military actions. Nevertheless, a sizable number of Quakers still participated in the conflict in some form, and dealt with the repercussions of doing so.

== Background ==
By 1750, Quakers lived across the colonies, with settlements in New Hampshire, Connecticut, Rhode Island, Massachusetts, Delaware, New York, Maryland, and both North and South Carolina. In addition, Quakers heavily settled in both the Pennsylvania and New Jersey colonies, and controlled the former both culturally and politically. Though widespread, many of these communities maintained contact with each other and with Quakers in Great Britain. This sustained communication complimented Quaker attitudes towards their community and society at large- for the most part Quakerism encouraged a high degree of internal unity, as well as a cultural separation from outsiders. Nevertheless, this separation usually did not negatively affect Quaker communities, and across the colonies (and especially in Pennsylvania) members of the Society of Friends thrived.

Quaker Theology promoted diplomacy and rejected any forms of physical violence. The faith accepted the authority of secular governments, but refused to support war in any form. This is commonly referred to as the Peace Testimony. Those who acted against the religion's tenets and refused to repent were usually expelled from the faith.

Many of these religious guidelines were dictated at regular meetings. Biweekly Preparative meetings acted as the regular worship times, while regional Monthly meetings dealt with disciplining those who acted against the faith's beliefs. Additionally, annual Yearly Meetings served as the highest authority on both spiritual and practical matters. Of these, the Philadelphia Yearly Meeting held the most recognized authority.

By the second half of the eighteenth century, many Quakers held positions of authority in the Pennsylvania Assembly. However, the onset of the French and Indian War caused most Quaker members to leave their governing positions. This experience encouraged many within the faith to forsake external success and instead focus on religious reform. Consequently, Pennsylvania Quakers became much more strict concerning their congregation's conduct, and expelled increasingly more members for such offenses. Other Quaker communities soon followed Pennsylvania's example.

== Early stages of the Revolution ==
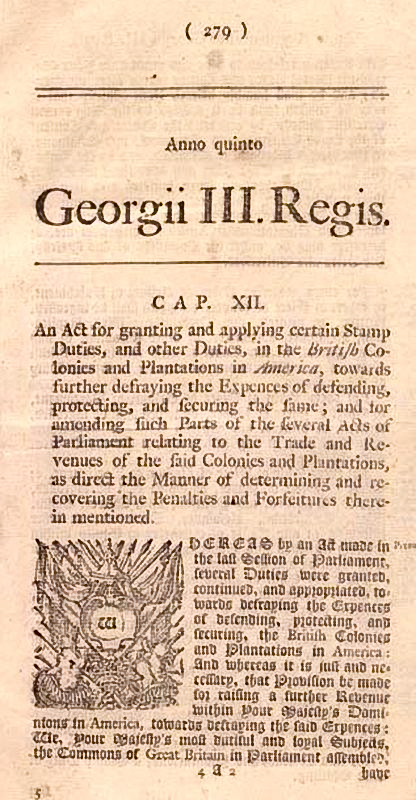
Many Quaker merchants nonviolently protested the 1765 Stamp Act through non-importation agreements.

Though opposed to violence, Quakers nonetheless played a part in the growing tensions between Britain and the colonies. Due to their ties to the British Society of Friends and economic situation, Pennsylvania Quakers largely supported reconciliatory measures in the early years of disagreement. In addition, the 1763 Paxton Riots challenged Quaker domination in the colony and increased fears of religious persecution dramatically.

However, by 1765 some in the community began to criticize the increased British taxation under the newly passed Stamp Act. Quaker merchants from both sides of the Atlantic opposed the act, and many peacefully protested its economic impact and lack of colonial representation. Almost immediately after the act was passed, eighty Quaker merchants from Philadelphia signed a non-importation agreement. Quaker leadership largely attempted to keep the protests nonviolent, and their moderating influence kept events Pennsylvania and New Jersey comparatively peaceful next to those in New England.

This relative peace disappeared in 1767 with the passage of the Townshend Acts. Much like before, Pennsylvania Quakers attempted to curtail protests against the acts, but by mid-1768 were unable to contain the swell of anti-British sentiments. Instead of suppressing conflicts, the Friends were losing political support to more radical factions without reservations towards violence.

== During the war ==
The American Revolutionary War created significant issues for the Quakers and their pacifism. The population of Pennsylvania could no longer be controlled or kept from conflict—for example, groups of Philadelphians began to assemble as informal militias in direct violation of the Pennsylvania Assembly. With the publication of the Declaration of Independence in 1776, Quaker communities all across the colonies were forced to deal with a situation that could no longer be resolved without violence.

=== Quaker Assemblies respond ===
Pennsylvania's Quakers devoted considerable time to the issues of the war in their Yearly Meetings. Even as late as 1775 those at the Meetings protested the increased hostilities, and argued they had attempted to prevent them:

We have by repeated public advices and private admonitions, used our endeavours to dissuade the members of our religious society from joining with the public resolutions promoted and entered into by some of the people, which as we apprehended, so now we find have increased contention, and produced great discord and confusion.

Additionally, Quakers rejected not only the conflict itself, but also refused to pay any taxes or fines that supported a militia. The Philadelphia Yearly Meeting of 1776 outlined this rule for its constituents:

It is our judgment [it laid down] that such who make religious profession with us, and do either openly or by connivance, pay any fine, penalty, or tax, in lieu of their personal services for carrying on war; or who do consent to, and allow their children, apprentices, or servants to act therein do thereby violate our Christian testimony, and by doing so manifest that they are not in religious fellowship with us.

Some Friends also refused to use the paper money, called "Continentals", which the Second Continental Congress produced during the war. They viewed the currency as supporting a violent cause and therefore against their religious beliefs. Unlike with the issue of direct taxation, however, Quaker leaders never reached a consensus regarding the Continental, and oftentimes allowed individuals to decide for themselves whether or not to use the currency.

These restrictions did not stop all Quakers from participating in the war effort, and as a result high numbers of Friends were disciplined for some level of involvement. Historian Arthur J. Mekeel calculates that between 1774 and 1785 1,724 Quakers were disowned from the faith for participating in the Revolution in some way.

=== Alternative Quaker responses ===
The individual Quaker's response to the American Revolution varied widely. While some supported the colonies and others were avowed loyalists, the majority of Friends followed their faith and largely stayed out of the conflict.

==== Quakers active in the Revolution ====
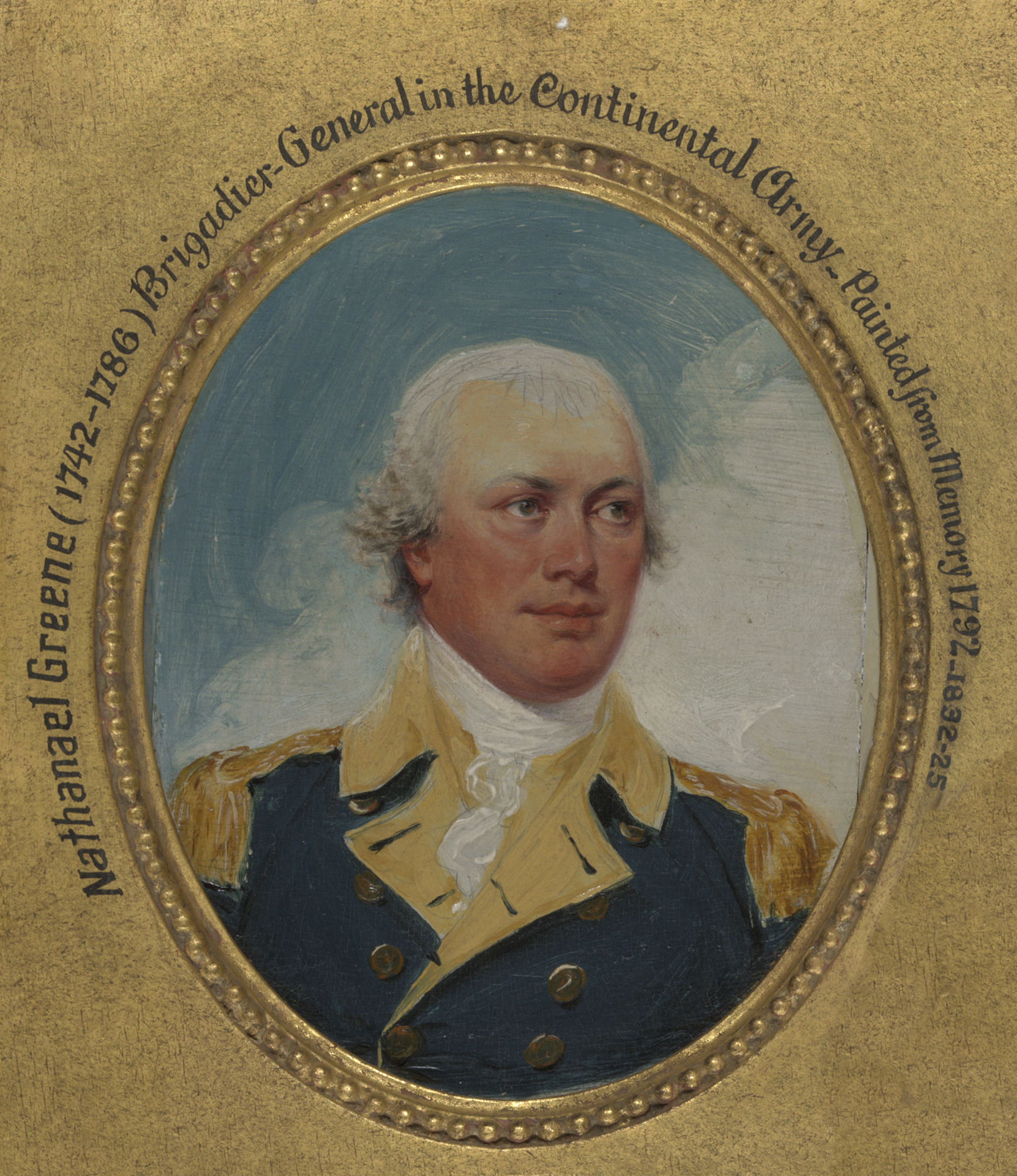
American General Nathanael Greene chose to support the American Revolution over Quaker pacifism.

Individual Quakers made choices to fight in the American Revolution despite the doctrine of pacifism. The Chase Chronicle, a publication of the Chase-Chace Family Association incorporated in Hartford Connecticut in 1899, contained articles of note about Col. Thomas Chase that gives perspective as to one of the reasons why some Quakers participated in the American Revolution, "When we stop to recall the Quaker Doctrine, it seems paradoxical to give Col. Thomas Chase, the prefix of a military title, yet it belongs to him by right of distinguished service in the Revolutionary War and we can only conclude that while the Quakers believed in peace in the abstract, it could not interfere with their patriotic duty in times of need."

Daniel Chase also served in the American Revolution, and while words are scarce as to why, his ancestry gives some clue. He was a descendant of Stephen Bachiler’s daughter Deborah, whose son, Daniel Wing, was instrumental in resisting oppressive laws in the town of Sandwich and was one of the first 18 families to convert to the faith in 1658 (see History of the Quakers#Sandwich and Daniel Wing). His service in the American Revolution was a continuation of what had by this time, become a tradition from generation to generation, to resist oppression and unfair laws.

Future founders of the Free Quakers also participated in the war. These Friends considered the Revolution to be a fight for a divinely-ordained new system of government that would change the world for the better. The Free Quakers were expelled for violating the Peace Testimony, but after the Revolution founded a short-lived sect of Quakerism based on those principles.

Several notable figures in the American Revolution were also Quakers. Thomas Paine, author of the pamphlet Common Sense, was born into a Quaker family, and Quaker thought arguably influenced his writings and philosophies. Similarly, the American General Nathanael Greene was raised Quaker, and, as historian William C. Kashatus III states, "wrestled with a fundamental ideological dilemma: 'Was it possible to balance an allegiance to the state without deviating from the principles of the Society of Friends?'" Greene likely dealt with this internal conflict throughout his life, and after the war never completely returned to the Society of Friends.

==== Quaker relief efforts ====
Some Quakers also participated in relief effort during the war without fighting in it. In the winter of 1775–1776 Friends from Pennsylvania, New Jersey and elsewhere donated money and goods to the inhabitants of Boston while the British occupied the city. This and other donations throughout the war were accepted with varying degrees of suspicion by both American and British forces. In addition, individuals sometimes attempted relief efforts by tending to wounded after battles or comforting prisoners of war.

=== Impact on Quakers during the war ===
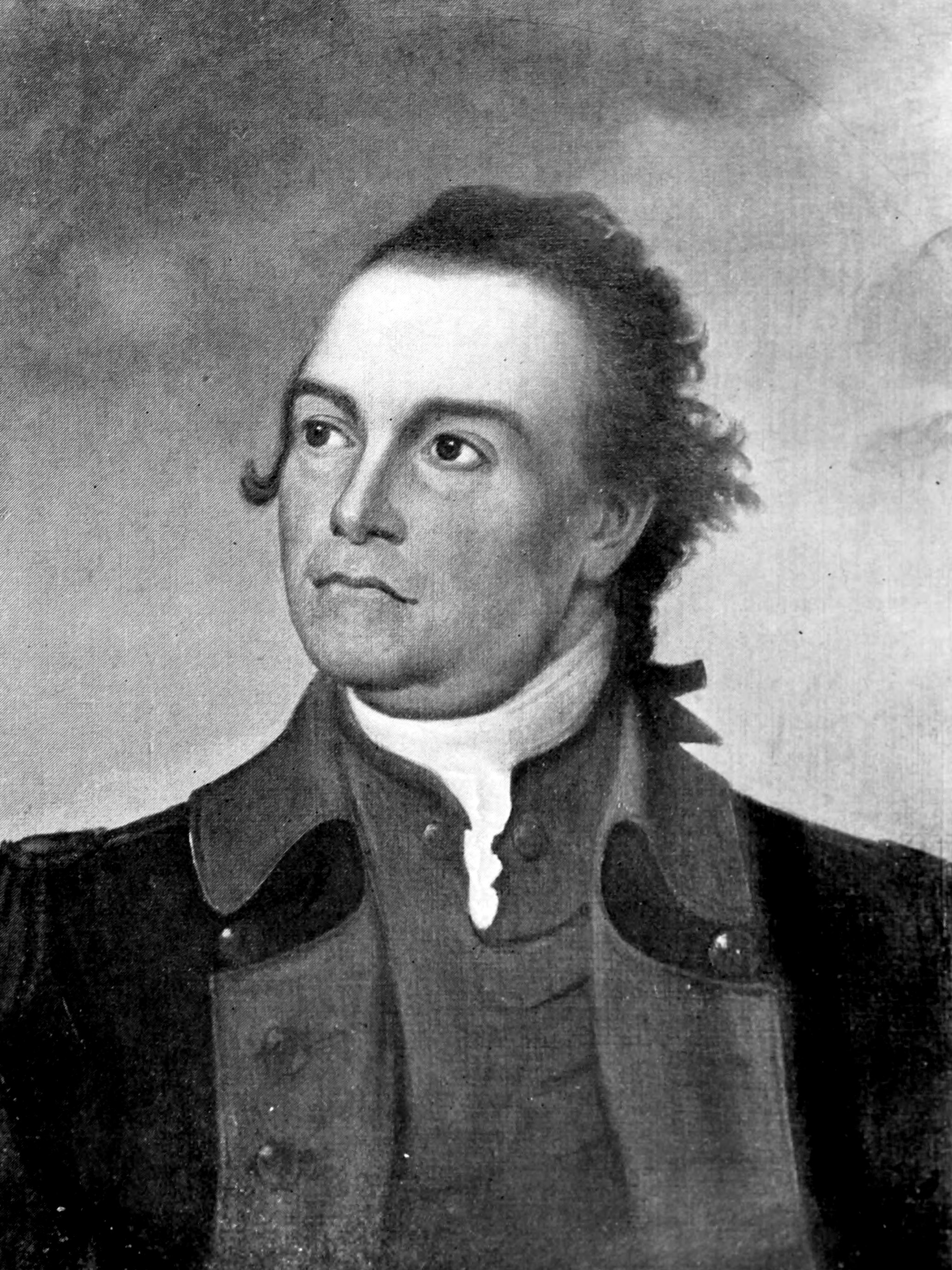
General John Sullivan falsely accused Quakers of spying for the British with the 1777 "Spanktown Papers".

Quakers who refused to support the war often suffered for their religious beliefs at the hands of non-Quaker Loyalists and Patriots alike. Some Friends were arrested for refusing to pay taxes or follow conscription requirements, particularly in Massachusetts near the end of the war when demand for new recruits increased. However, substantially more Quakers experienced economic hardship. Throughout the war, British and American forces seized both Quaker and Non-Quaker goods for their armies, yet Non-Quaker authorities throughout the colonies seized additional property from Quakers, both for refusing to pay taxes and occasionally for opposing the war effort.

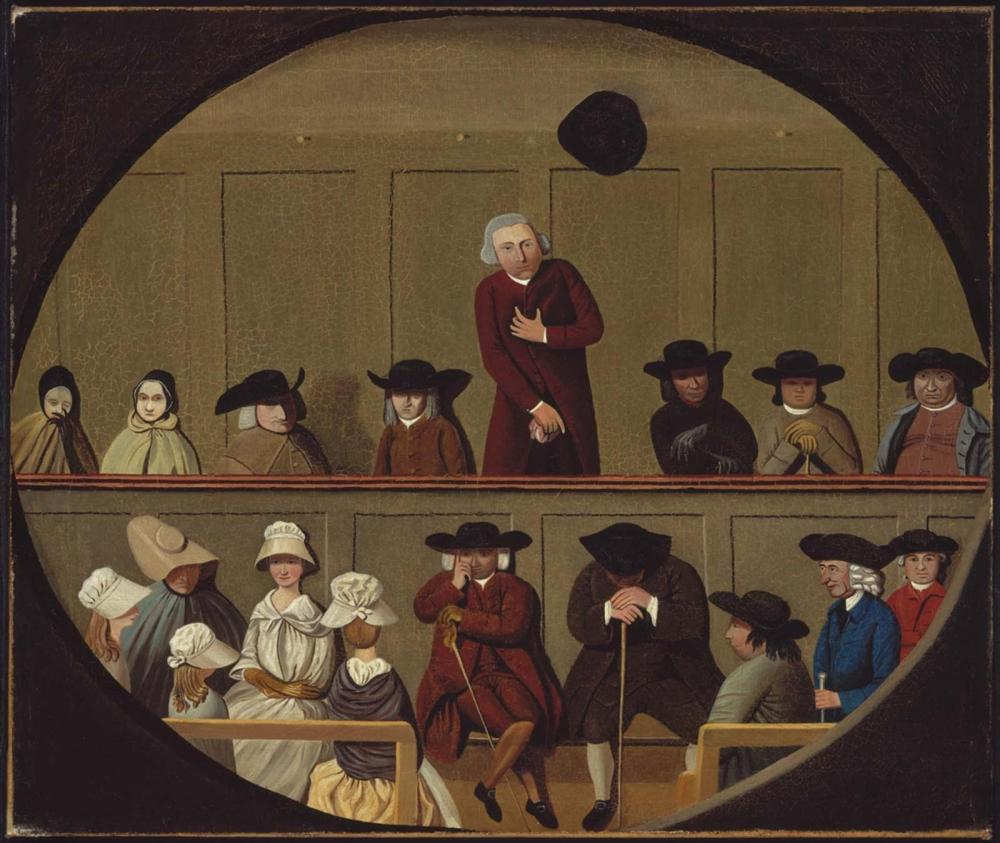
Painting of what a Quaker meeting would have looked like

Due to fading relationships with the Quakers, in 1777, Pennsylvania government decided to exile 20 Quaker men from Philadelphia, and they were forced to travel to Virginia. There were multiple reasons for this. Many Pennsylvania politicians believed that their zero tolerance for violence meant they did not want to fight for their freedom from the British Crown. While exiling them from Philadelphia can be seen as a harsh punishment, this was a rather tame ruling as one year later, in 1778, Abraham Carlisle and John Roberts were charged with treason as they were found aiding the British army. Carlisle was charged with holding a commission in the king's army and giving intelligence to the British. Roberts was charged with acting as a guide for the British, encouraging others to enlist in the British cause, and conveying intelligence to the enemy. This was mainly seen as politically motivated as many came to the defense of both men. However, Pennsylvania wanted those, mainly the Quakers, who were strongly suspected of aiding the British to understand the penalty for committing treason. This had become an ongoing moral issue for many of Pennsylvania's citizens as They had to differentiate between those individuals who truly embraced the principles of the Revolution out of a firm commitment to the common good, and those who came to them suddenly and only out of a desire to promote their own interests.

Occasionally, suspicious non-Quakers also accused Friends of being British sympathizers or spies. In August 1777 American General John Sullivan supposedly discovered a letter from the (fictitious) Quaker Yearly Meeting at Spanktown, New Jersey (modern-day Rahway), that contained movements and information on American military forces. Sullivan subsequently wrote to John Hancock, president of the Continental Congress, and accused the Quakers of being loyalists and traitors. These "Spanktown Papers" Sullivan 'discovered' were clear forgeries, but nonetheless turned many against the Friends. Sullivan's forgeries convinced a committee of the Continental Congress composed of John Adams, Richard Henry Lee, and William Duer to exile twenty leading Philadelphia Quakers to Staunton, Virginia, for more than seven months.

== After the war ==
The American Revolutionary War officially ended with the 1783 Treaty of Paris. Quaker communities throughout the newly established United States of America immediately began to influence small factors in the formation of new governments. For example, before this time a public official usually needed to swear an oath of allegiance to the state, yet this rule was altered to allow affirmations as well, allowing Quakers to freely participate in the government.

However, the Revolutionary War negatively impacted many Quakers as well. Partially thanks to the negative climate following the "Spanktown Papers" and partially because of economic factors, beginning in 1783 hundreds of Quakers left the United States and moved to Canada, with many settling in Pennfield, New Brunswick. Some of these Friends had been expelled from the faith for siding with the British during the war, and others had been genuine pacifists, but none could remain in the United States after the nation had gained independence.

The Revolution's legacy impacted American Quakers in one other major way. Before the war, many Quakers possessed extensive economic and political power in several states, most notably in Pennsylvania and New Jersey. However, the war had alienated the pacifist Quakers from their neighbors, causing most Friends in power to begin withdrawing from active political life as early as the 1760s. The Revolution increased American Quakers' sense of isolation, consequently making postwar Quakerism less culturally diverse and more dogmatically unified. American Quakers would never regain the amount of political influence they had once possessed.
