= Timothy Matlack =

American politician, military officer and businessman (1736–1829)

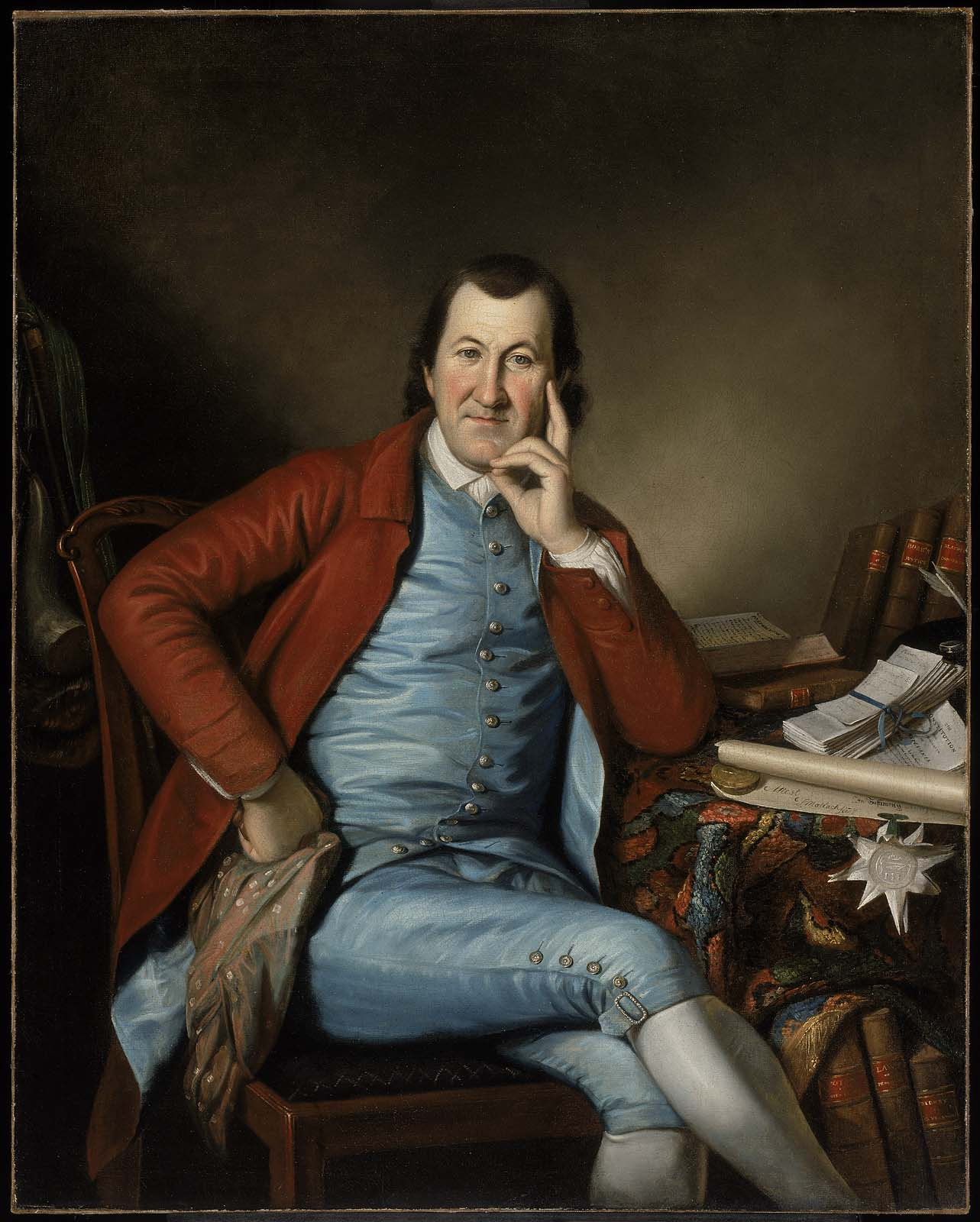
- Portrait by Charles Willson Peale, c. 1790
- Born: March 28, 1736; Haddonfield, Province of New Jersey, British America
- Died: April 14, 1829 (aged 93); Holmesburg, Philadelphia, Pennsylvania, U.S.
- Resting place: Wetherills Cemetery in Audubon, Pennsylvania
- Known for: "Scribe of the Declaration of Independence"
- Spouses: Eleanor Yarnell (m. 1758; died 1791) Elizabeth Claypoole (m. 1797)

Timothy Matlack (March 28, 1736 – April 14, 1829) was an American politician, military officer and businessman who was chosen in 1776 to inscribe the original United States Declaration of Independence on vellum. A brewer and beer bottler who emerged as a popular and powerful leader in the American Revolutionary War, Matlack served as Secretary of Pennsylvania during the conflict and a delegate to the Second Continental Congress in Philadelphia in 1780. Matlack was known for his excellent penmanship, and his handwritten copy of the Declaration is on public display in the Rotunda of the Charters of Freedom at the National Archives Building in Washington, D.C.

Matlack became one of Pennsylvania's most provocative and influential political figures. He was removed from office by his political enemies at the end of the Revolutionary War, but returned to power in the Jeffersonian era.

== Early life and education ==
Matlack was born in Haddonfield, New Jersey, on March 28, 1736, to Elizabeth Martha Burr Haines and Timothy Matlack. His grandparents were William Matlack and Mary Hancock, and Henry Burr and Elizabeth Hudson. His siblings were Sybil, Elizabeth, Titus, Seth, Josiah, and White Matlack; his half-siblings were Reuben Haines and Mary Haines. His first cousin was a Quaker abolitionist John Woolman.

In 1738, the family moved to Philadelphia, and he was apprenticed to the prosperous Quaker merchant John Reynell in 1749. At the end of his term, he married Ellen Yarnall, the daughter of Quaker minister Mordecai Yarnall, and their children were William, Mordecai, Sibyl, Catharine, and Martha.

== Career ==
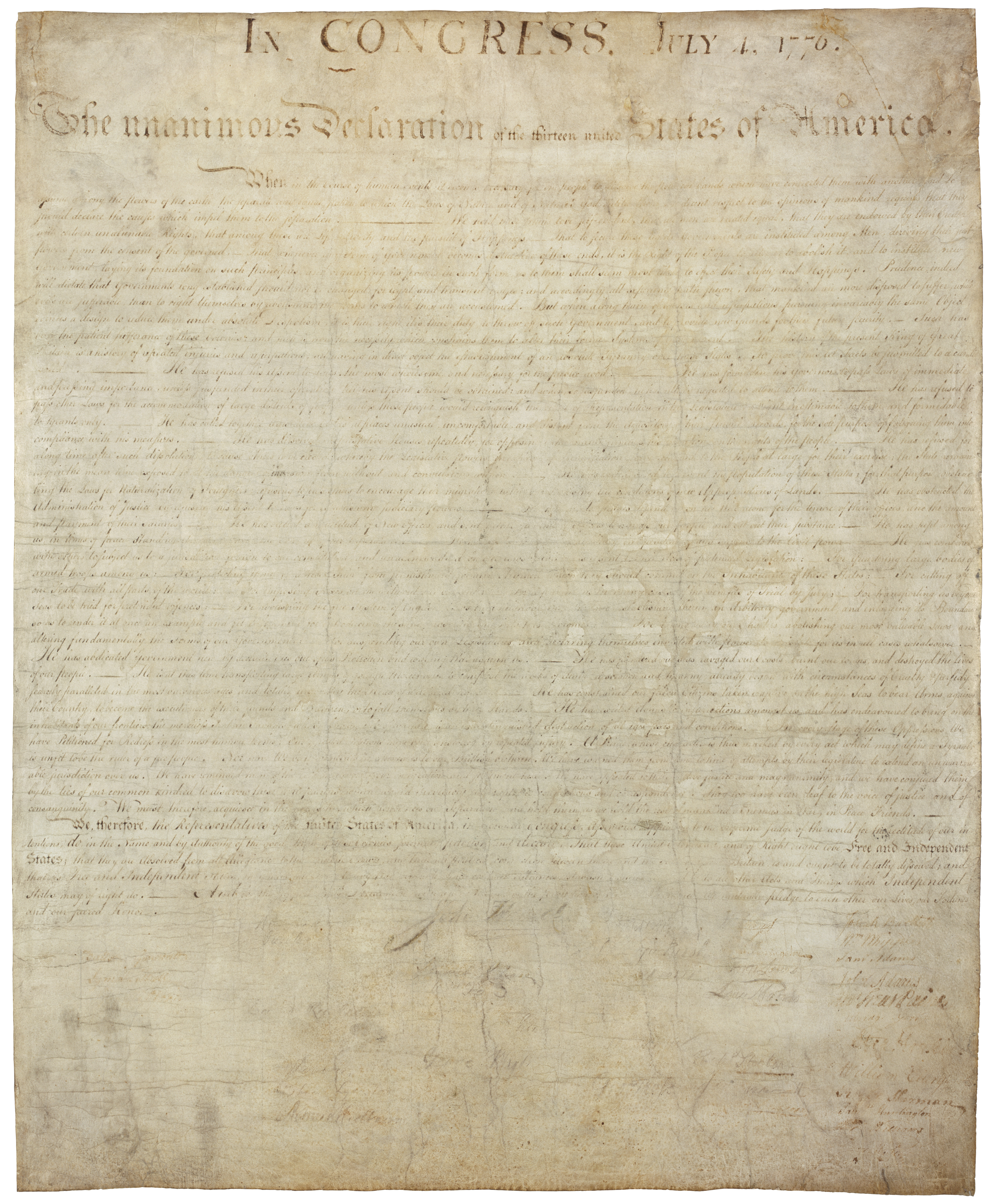
Matlack's original Declaration of Independence, now faded, is on public view in the Charters of Freedom rotunda of the National Archives Building in Washington, D.C.

In 1760, Matlack opened a store called the Case Knife, and he and Owen Biddle purchased a steel furnace in Trenton, New Jersey, in 1762. His shop failed in 1765, and he was disowned by the Quakers who complained that he had been "frequenting company in such a manner as to spend too much of his time from home". He was confined to debtors' prison in 1768 and 1769.

By 1769, Matlack set up a new business selling bottled beer and opened his own brewery near Independence Hall in Philadelphia.

In 1774, Matlack was hired by Charles Thomson, Secretary of the First Continental Congress, to engross (transcribe) an address to the King of England.

In May 1775, he became clerk to the Second Continental Congress and, in June, he composed George Washington's commission as commander-in-chief of the Continental Army of the United Colonies. Congress elevated him to Storekeeper of Military Supplies. He was also a member of Philadelphia's Committee of Inspection and Secretary of the Committee of Officers of the city's three militia battalions.

In January 1776, Philadelphia added two more battalions to its militia brigade, and Matlack was elected Colonel of the Fifth Battalion of Rifle Rangers. He was a delegate to the Conference of Committees, which met in June to plan a new constitution for Pennsylvania. Later that month, he engrossed the United States Declaration of Independence on parchment, and the 56 delegates to the Second Continental Congress began signing it on August 2, 1776; it was unanimously adopted by all 56 delegates on July 4, 1776.

Matlack was instrumental in drafting the Pennsylvania Constitution of 1776, which he ardently defended against critics, including Benjamin Rush, James Wilson, and John Dickinson. Newspapers were his primary medium and he signed a number of articles with the pseudonym Tiberius Gracchus. As Secretary to the Supreme Executive Council of Pennsylvania, Matlack was one of the most powerful men in the new state during the American Revolutionary War. In 1780, his government passed an Act for the Gradual Abolition of Slavery.

The Philadelphia and Pennsylvania militia crossed the Delaware River with Washington on December 27, 1776, and Colonel Matlack and his 5th Rifle Battalion were part of the expedition. Washington credited the Pennsylvania militia for their timely service in this campaign, and other officers commended the force for its manliness and spirit. Following the British occupation of Philadelphia, Washington assigned Benedict Arnold to the post of Commandant of Philadelphia, and Matlack came to despise Arnold's presence. He led an investigation of Arnold's wrongdoing, which triggered a court martial, and the court sentenced Arnold to be reprimanded by the Commander-in-Chief. Washington said that his officer's behavior had been "reprehensible"; Arnold's treason was discovered five months later.

Matlack was named a trustee of the University of the State of Pennsylvania in 1779. In 1780, he was elected a member of the American Philosophical Society and served as its secretary from 1781 to 1783.

In 1781, Matlack was among the founders of The Religious Society of Free Quakers, Quakers who were "disowned" because of their support of the American war for independence. He was also one of the earliest opponents of slavery in America, and he felt that the Quakers were not moving quickly enough to abolish it.

Along with Benjamin Franklin and Robert Morris, Matlack helped raise a substantial sum of money to construct the Free Quaker Meeting House at the corner of Fifth and Arch Streets in Center City Philadelphia.

In 1790, Matlack was commissioned to survey the "headwaters of the Susquehanna River and the streams of the New Purchase," the northwestern portion of the state purchased from the American Indians. They were also charged with exploring a route for a passageway to connect the West Branch with the Allegheny River. He lived in Lancaster, Pennsylvania, from 1799 until 1808 when Lancaster was the capital of Pennsylvania, and he worked as a clerk of the Pennsylvania State Senate.

Matlack was known for his household garden, which included 28 types of peach tree.

== Death ==
Matlack died in Holmesburg, Pennsylvania, on April 14, 1829, and was interred in the Free Quaker Burial Ground on South Fifth Street in Philadelphia. In 1905, his remains were removed and reinterred in Wetherill Cemetery opposite Valley Forge.

== In popular culture ==
- In the 2004 film National Treasure, Matlack is mentioned in a riddle solved by the protagonist, Ben Gates (Nicolas Cage).
- The font, American Scribe is inspired by Matlack's penmanship.

== See also ==
- Jacob Shallus, engrosser of the 1787 United States Constitution
- William Lambert, engrosser of the United States Bill of Rights

== Notes ==
- Coelho, Chris. Timothy Matlack: Scribe of the Declaration of Independence. Jefferson, NC: McFarland, 2013.
- Fanelli, Doris Devine, Karie Diethorn and John C. Milley. History of the Portrait Collection, Independence National Historical Park. Philadelphia: American Philosophical Society, 2001.
- Johnson, Allen and Dumas Malone, eds. Dictionary of American Biography. New York: Charles Scribner & Sons, 1933, vol 12, pp 409–410
- Landis, Bertha Cochran. Col. Timothy Matlack. Papers read before the Lancaster County Historical Society, Vol. XLII-No.6; Lancaster, PA: 1938.
- Stackhouse, A. M. Col. Timothy Matlack, Patriot and Soldier. [N.p.]: Privately printed, 1910.
- Wetherill, Charles. History of The Religious Society of Friends Called by Some The Free Quakers, in the City of Philadelphia. Philadelphia: Printed for the Society, 1894
- Yarnall, John K. Yarnall Family Record in America from 1683 to 1913. Chicago, Dec. 1913.; William Wade Hinshaw, Encyclopedia of American Quaker Genealogy, Vol. II - Philadelphia MM records.
