= Charters of Freedom =

United States founding documents

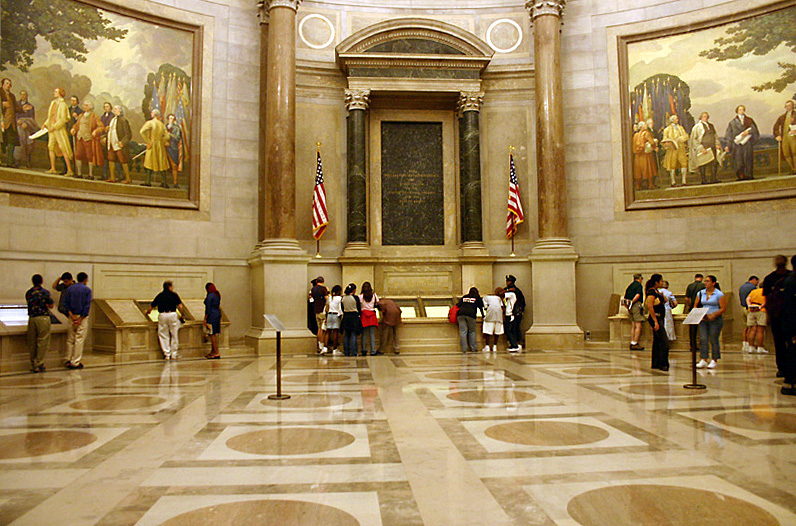
The Rotunda for the Charters of Freedom in the National Archives Building in Washington, D.C. where, between two Barry Faulkner murals, the original United States Declaration of Independence, United States Constitution, and other American founding documents are exhibited

The term Charters of Freedom is used to describe the three documents in early United States history which are considered instrumental to its founding and philosophy. The documents are the United States Declaration of Independence, the Constitution, and the Bill of Rights. While the term has not entered particularly common usage, the room at the National Archives Building in Washington, D.C. that houses the three documents is called the Rotunda for the Charters of Freedom.

The National Archives preserves and displays the texts in massive, bronze-framed, bulletproof, bombproof, moisture-controlled sealed display cases in a rotunda style room by day and in multi-ton bomb-proof vaults by night.

The Charters of Freedom are flanked by Barry Faulkner’s two grand murals, one featuring Thomas Jefferson amidst the Continental Congress, and the other featuring on James Madison at the Constitutional Convention. Along the Charters of Freedom is a dual display of the "Formation of the Union", including documents related to the evolution of the U.S. government between 1774 and 1791, including the Articles of Association (1774), the Articles of Confederation and Perpetual Union (1778), the Treaty of Paris (1783), and Washington's First Inaugural Address (1789).

== History ==
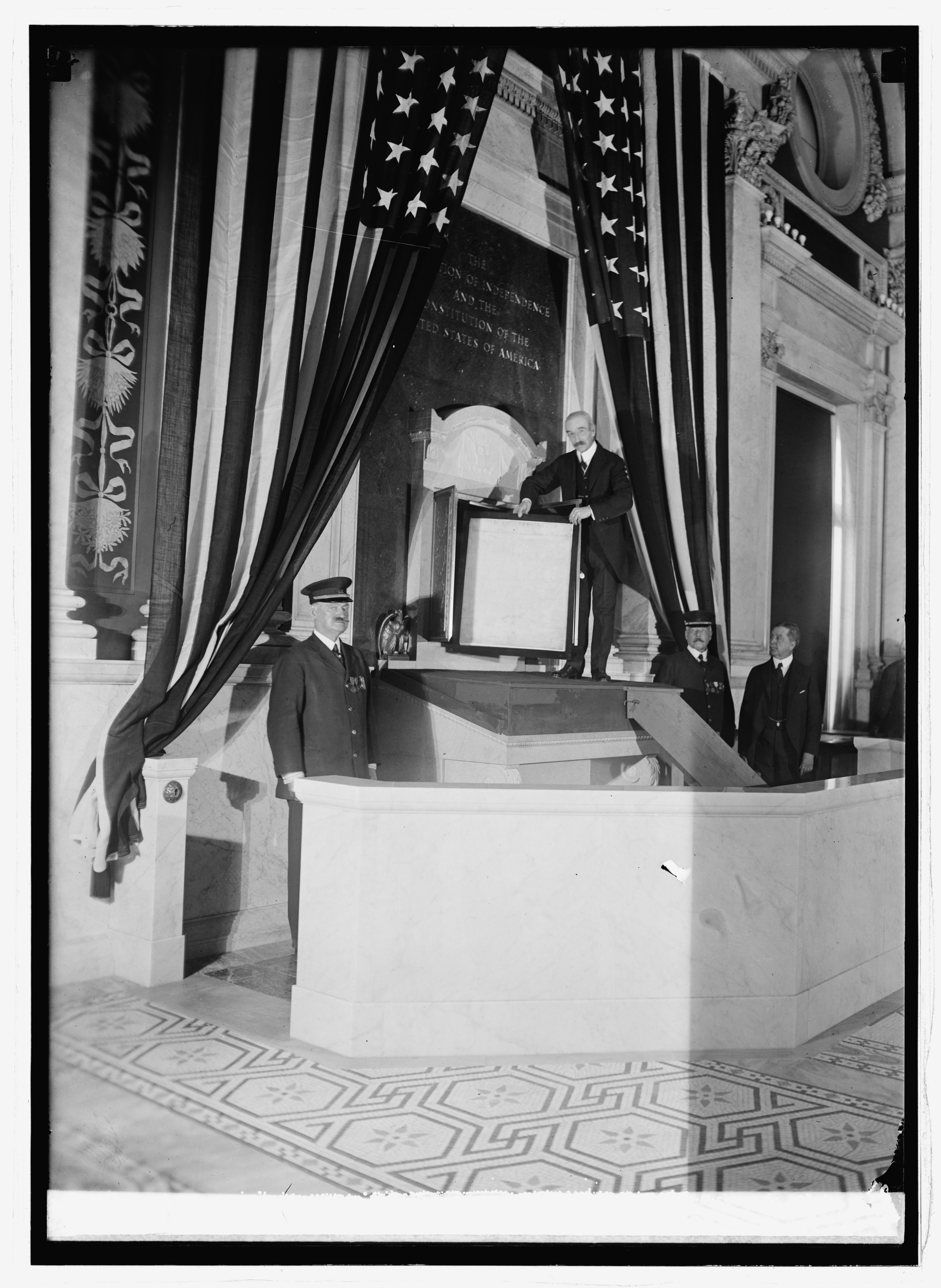
Librarian of Congress Herbert Putnam at the opening of the Charters of Freedom Shrine on February 28, 1924

Librarian of Congress Herbert Putnam collected the Declaration and Constitution from the State Department safes and brought them to the Library of Congress in a mail wagon. Putnam requested funds to allow the documents to be put on display so "might be treated in such a way as, while fully safe-guarding them and giving them distinction, they should be open to inspection by the public at large".

On March 12, 1922, $12,000 (equivalent to $230,815 in 2025) was approved and Francis Henry Bacon was appointed to design a shrine to house the documents. The two parchment documents were turned over to the Library of Congress by executive order, and on February 28, 1924, President Coolidge dedicated the bronze-and-marble shrine for public display of the Constitution at the Thomas Jefferson Building, the library's headquarters. The parchments were laid over moisture-absorbing cellulose paper, vacuum-sealed between double panes of insulated plate glass, and protected from light by a gelatin film. Building construction of the Archives Building was completed in 1935. The documents were moved from the Library of Congress in December 1941, and stored at the U.S. Bullion Depository in Fort Knox, Kentucky, until September 1944. In 1951, following a study by the National Bureau of Standards to protect from atmosphere, insects, mold and light, the parchments were re-encased with special light filters, inert helium gas and proper humidity.

Since 1952, the Charters of Freedom and the Freedom Shrine have been displayed in the Rotunda of the National Archives Building. Visual inspections have been enhanced by electronic imaging. Changes in the cases led to the documents' removal from their cases in July 2001, preservation treatment by conservators, and installment in new encasements for public display in September 2003.

=== Constitution ===
At first there was little interest in the parchment object itself. James Madison had custody of it as Secretary of State (1801–1809) but having left Washington DC, he had lost track of it in the years leading to his death. A publisher had access to it in 1846 for a book on the Constitution. In 1883, historian J. Franklin Jameson found the parchment folded in a small tin box on the floor of a closet at the State, War and Navy Building. In 1894 the State Department sealed the Declaration and Constitution between two glass plates and kept them in a safe.

==== Original errata ====
During its first century, the parchment "Copy of the Constitution" was not directly viewed for public purposes, and most of the penned copies sent to the states are lost.

On inspection of one of the remaining copies held at the National Archives, there is an apparent spelling error in the original parchment Constitution in the Export Clause of Article 1, Section 10 on page 2, where the possessive pronoun its appears to be spelled with an apostrophe, turning it into it's. However, the letters t and s are connected, and the mark interpreted as an apostrophe is somewhat inconspicuous; different U.S. government sources have transcribed this phrase with and without the apostrophe.

The spelling Pensylvania is used in the list of signatories at the bottom of page 4 of the original document. Elsewhere, in Article 1, Section 2, the spelling that is usual today, Pennsylvania, is used. However, in the late 18th century, the use of a single n to spell "Pennsylvania" was common usage — the Liberty Bell's inscription, for example, uses a single n.

=== Bill of Rights ===
George Washington had fourteen handwritten copies of the Bill of Rights made, one for Congress and one for each of the original thirteen states. The copies for Georgia, Maryland, New York, and Pennsylvania went missing. The New York copy is thought to have been destroyed in a fire. Two unidentified copies of the missing four (thought to be the Georgia and Maryland copies) survive; one is in the National Archives, and the other is in the New York Public Library. North Carolina's copy was stolen from the State Capitol by a Union soldier following the Civil War. In an FBI sting operation, it was recovered in 2003. The copy retained by the First Congress has been on display (along with the Constitution and the Declaration of Independence) in the Rotunda for the Charters of Freedom room at the National Archives Building in Washington, D.C. since December 13, 1952.

In 1941, President Franklin D. Roosevelt declared December 15 to be Bill of Rights Day, commemorating the 150th anniversary of the ratification of the Bill of Rights. In 1991, the Virginia copy of the Bill of Rights toured the country in honor of its bicentennial, visiting the capitals of all fifty states.

=== Formation of the Union documents ===
The "Formation of the Union" display contains documents related to the evolution of the U.S. government from 1774 to 1791.

== Preservation of the Charters of Freedom ==
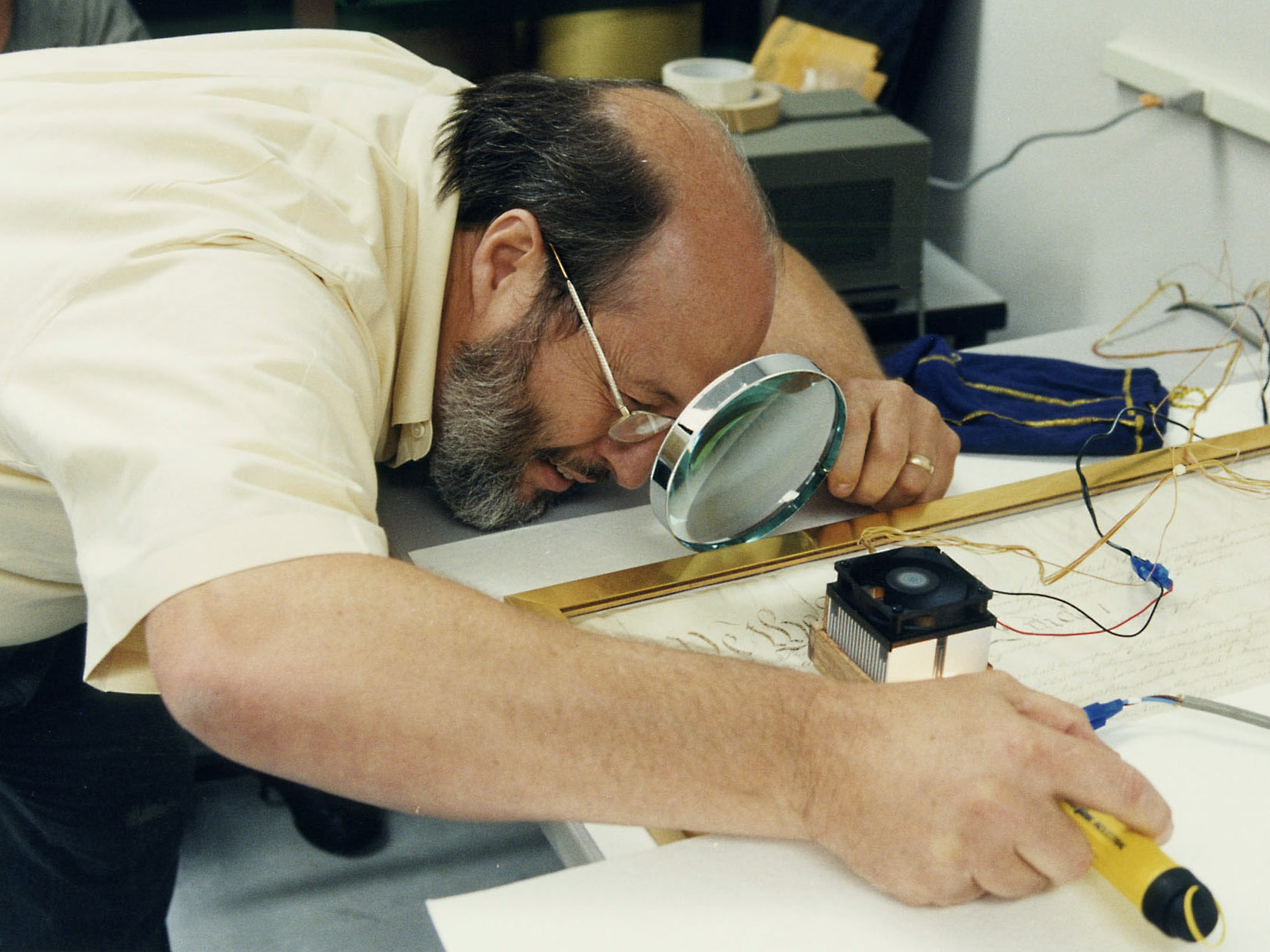
Langley Research Center researcher James West looks for the first signs of water vapor condensation in the encasement of the U.S. Constitution in April 2008.

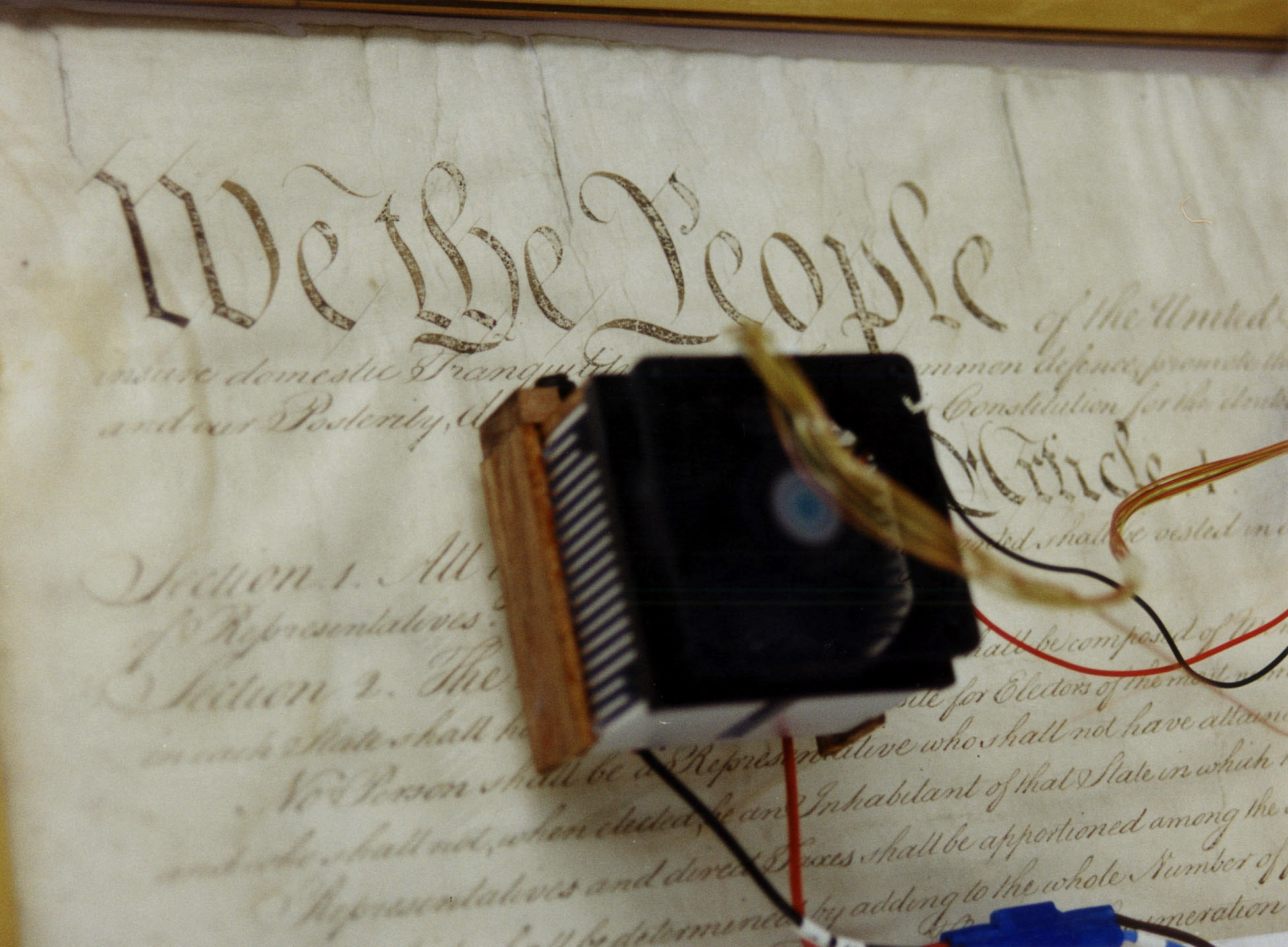
The mini-cooler used to determine the relative humidity of the atmosphere in the encasement of the U.S. Constitution

In 1952, the Charters were sealed in specially prepared airtight enclosures of tinted glass filled with humidified helium to protect the documents, along with 12 sheets of paper custom-made by the National Bureau of Standards. However, in the late 1980s, archivists began to notice signs of deterioration in the Charters. Micro-droplets of liquid and tiny white crystals were forming (in a process known as crizzling) on the surface of the protective glass, and it was feared that they might continue growing if left unchecked, and could be a sign of unexpected moisture inside the enclosure.

In 1998, Langley Research Center researcher Joel S. Levinee was asked by the National Archives and Records Administration to form and lead a team to identify the precise cause and origin of the crystals, without opening the encasements, if at all possible. Additionally, his team was asked to try to answer the following:

1. Had the helium gas used to protect the Charters leaked out of the hermetically sealed encasements?
2. Did chemically corrosive air (with its variety of acids, humidity, and trace elements of ozone) leak in?
3. What was the relative humidity in the encasement atmospheres?

In order to ensure reliability of his methods and measurements, Levine decided to split his team into three groups, each of which would work independently of each other. Two of the teams would use non-invasive measurement techniques to study the atmosphere through the glass encasement, while the third team would determine the chemical composition of extracted samples from each case. All of the teams would be made completely unaware of the others’ methods and findings until the very end, to ensure complete scientific independence. Ultimately, all teams produced very consistent results.

One method employed by Levine's task force was the use of laser spectroscopy, which non-invasively measured helium and relative humidity using advanced technology originally developed by NASA to measure trace gases in the Earth's atmosphere, and chemical impurities and moisture levels in wind tunnels. Another method employed by the second team was the use of a "mini-cooler," or dew-point hygrometer, which cooled an extremely small, localized portion of the glass encasement, and measured the resulting condensation to determine interior humidity. The third team directly measured the gas content when the encasement was opened in March 2000. All three methods showed nearly identical measurements, confirming that the results were legitimate.

Levine's team presented their findings to NARA in 2002. They ultimately discovered that the helium atmosphere in the hermetically sealed encasements contained significantly more water vapor than previously believed. Levine said: "There is nearly twice as much water vapor in the atmosphere around the documents as there should be. Too much water vapor in a closed system like an encasement can cause the glass to chemically decompose, which will lead to the deterioration of the documents." The elevated concentration of water vapor reacted with the encasement glass, resulting in the leaching of alkaline material from the surface material, which formed into the tiny white spots seen in the encasements. The cause for this increase in water vapor was eventually tracked back to the sheepskin backing paper, which soaked up excess moisture on the day the Charters were originally sealed in the 1950s, during an unusually humid week. Once the Charters were sealed, the backing paper slowly released the excess water vapor it had soaked up, causing the internal humidity to rise.

In 2002, in an effort to better preserve all three documents, the Charters of Freedom were removed from their original encasements and placed in newly constructed, hermetically sealed encasements in an argon atmosphere with a relative humidity of only 25 to 35%.

"The U.S. Constitution is one of the most important documents in the history of the world. It was an honor and a privilege to be asked to perform this research," said Levine. "We're happy we were able to apply technology, originally developed at Langley for atmospheric science, remote sensing, laser spectroscopy and wind tunnel measurements, to ensure the future stability of the Charters of Freedom."

== See also ==
- Founding Fathers of the United States
- Signing of the United States Constitution
- Signing of the United States Declaration of Independence
- Timothy Matlack, inscribed the original U.S. Declaration of Independence
- Jacob Shallus, inscribed the original U.S. Constitution
- William Lambert, inscribed the original Bill of Rights
- Syng inkstand, used by delegates to sign both the Declaration and the Constitution
