= Barry Faulkner =

American painter

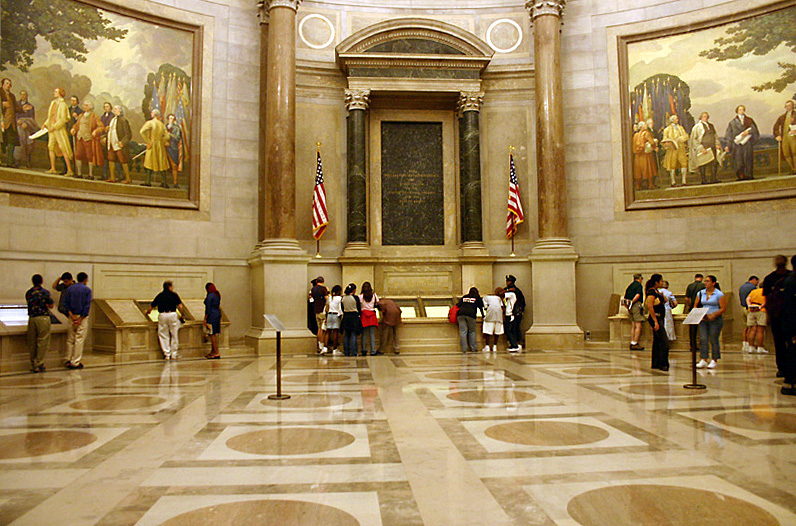
Faulkner's murals in the National Archive Administration's Rotunda for the Charters of Freedom are exhibited on either side of the original United States Declaration of Independence, United States Constitution, and other American founding documents.

Barry Faulkner (full name: Francis Barrett Faulkner; July 12, 1881 – October 27, 1966) was an American artist primarily known for his murals. During World War I, he and sculptor Sherry Edmundson Fry organized artists for training as camouflage specialists (called camoufleurs), an effort that contributed to the founding of the American Camouflage Corps in 1917.

Two of Faulkner's murals are exhibited on either side of America's original founding documents in the National Archives' Rotunda of the Charters of Freedom in Washington, D.C.

== Background ==
Faulkner was born in Keene, New Hampshire. He was a cousin of the painter and naturalist Abbott H. Thayer (sometimes called the “father of camouflage”), who lived in nearby Dublin (White 1951). He was a student of Thayer, George de Forest Brush and Augustus Saint-Gaudens. Discouraged by his family from pursuing a career in art, he agreed to attend one year at Harvard University, where his roommate was Saint-Gaudens’ son, Homer Saint-Gaudens. He then returned to the study of art and, in 1907, won the Rome Prize for traveling in Europe and study at the American Academy in Rome.

Faulkner returned to the U.S. in 1910, and thereafter worked as a muralist from his studio in New York City (Faulkner 1973). In 1926, he was elected into the National Academy of Design as an Associate member, and became a full Academician in 1931. He continued to serve as a trustee and active member of the American Academy and in 1960 received a Rome Medal for outstanding service.

== Camouflage contributions ==
With the outbreak of World War I, he and other New York artists anticipated the U.S. entry in the war. With Sherry Fry (who had also studied with Augustus Saint-Gaudens), he organized dozens of artists in a civilian pre-war unit called the New York Camouflage Society. After the U.S. entered the war, the U.S. Army formed its own unit, called the American Camouflage Corps, with Captain Homer Saint-Gaudens as its commanding officer (Behrens 2002; 2009, pp. 24–25). According to Faulkner’s autobiography, he and Fry, with four other artists (Laurence Grant, Henry Sutter, Harry Thrasher and “Casey” Jones), were the first enlisted camoufleurs. He spent the remainder of the war in France, attached to what was officially called Company A of the 40th Engineers (Faulkner 1973).

== Murals ==
Throughout his life, Faulkner's main achievements were as a muralist. His earliest commissions (beginning in 1907) were for murals in the homes of prominent families (Rumrill 2007). These led in turn to commissions for murals or mosaics for (among others):

- Washington Irving High School, New York City, 1916–19
- The Cunard Building, New York City
- Eastman Theatre, Rochester, New York, 1922
- Metropolitan Life Insurance Company, Ottawa, Ontario, Canada, 1927 (now the Canadian Parliament Wellington Building)
- University of Illinois Library, Urbana, Illinois, 1928
- Mortensen Hall at Bushnell Center, Hartford, Connecticut, 1931
- RCA Building, Rockefeller Center, New York City, 1933
- Phillips Academy Andover, Andover, Massachusetts, 1934
- National Archives Building (Rotunda of the Charters of Freedom), Washington, D.C., 1936
- Oregon State Capitol, Salem, Oregon, 1938, including a panel in the House chamber behind the Speaker's desk that depicts the 1843 meeting at Champoeg when Oregon formed a provisional government
- Senate Chamber, New Hampshire State Capitol, Concord (including a panel depicting Abbott H. Thayer and his followers), 1942
- John Hancock Building, Boston, 1949
- Keene National Bank (now Bank of America), Keene, New Hampshire, 1950
- Cheshire County Savings Bank, Keene, New Hampshire, 1955 (now at the Historical Society of Cheshire County)

The center panel of the ceiling in Mortensen Hall is the largest hand-painted ceiling mural in the United States. The work, entitled Drama, is based on Greek motifs although it is an ode to American progress in the early 20th century, including aviation, architecture, cinema and dramatic arts. The mural cost $50,000 in 1929 ($937,500 in 2025).

Several murals in the large foyer of the Washington Irving High School auditorium depict scenes from New York state history.

In 2007, the Historical Society of Cheshire County produced a full-color book about Faulkner's achievements as a muralist, with audio recordings of the artist talking about his life (Rumrill 2007).
