= White Matlack =

American abolitionist (1745–1824)

White Matlack (October 7, 1745; Haddonfield, New Jersey – January 7, 1824) was a New York Quaker and abolitionist. He was born to Elizabeth Martha Burr Haines and Timothy Matlack: a couple that had both lost their first spouses. His grandparents were William Matlack and Mary Hancock; and Henry Burr and Elizabeth Hudson. His siblings were Sybil, Elizabeth, Titus, Seth, Josiah and Timothy Matlack.

He married Mary Hawhurst on March 6, 1768. They had four children; White, Timothy, Mary, and Hannah.

White was a watchmaker and silversmith in New York City from around 1769 to 1775. In 1775, he also worked in Philadelphia. Then he ran a brewery located not far from the Fraunces Tavern. By the 1780s he moved into steel manufacturing.

In 1782, he and Isaac Howell signed a document titled The memorial and remonstrance of Isaac Howell and White Matlack, in behalf of themselves, and others, who have been disowned by the people called Quakers, &c. White and his brother Timothy had been disowned by Orthodox Quakers for their support of the American Revolution. They formed a group with others called the Society of Free Quakers.

In 1786, he signed a letter to the Senate and assembly of the State of New York, against the shipping of African slaves through the port of New York.

Three years later he became a member of the New York Manumission Society. In 1787, the society founded the African Free School.

He died at Bay Side, near Flushing on Long Island, aged 80.
