= Constitution of the United States =

Supreme law of the United States

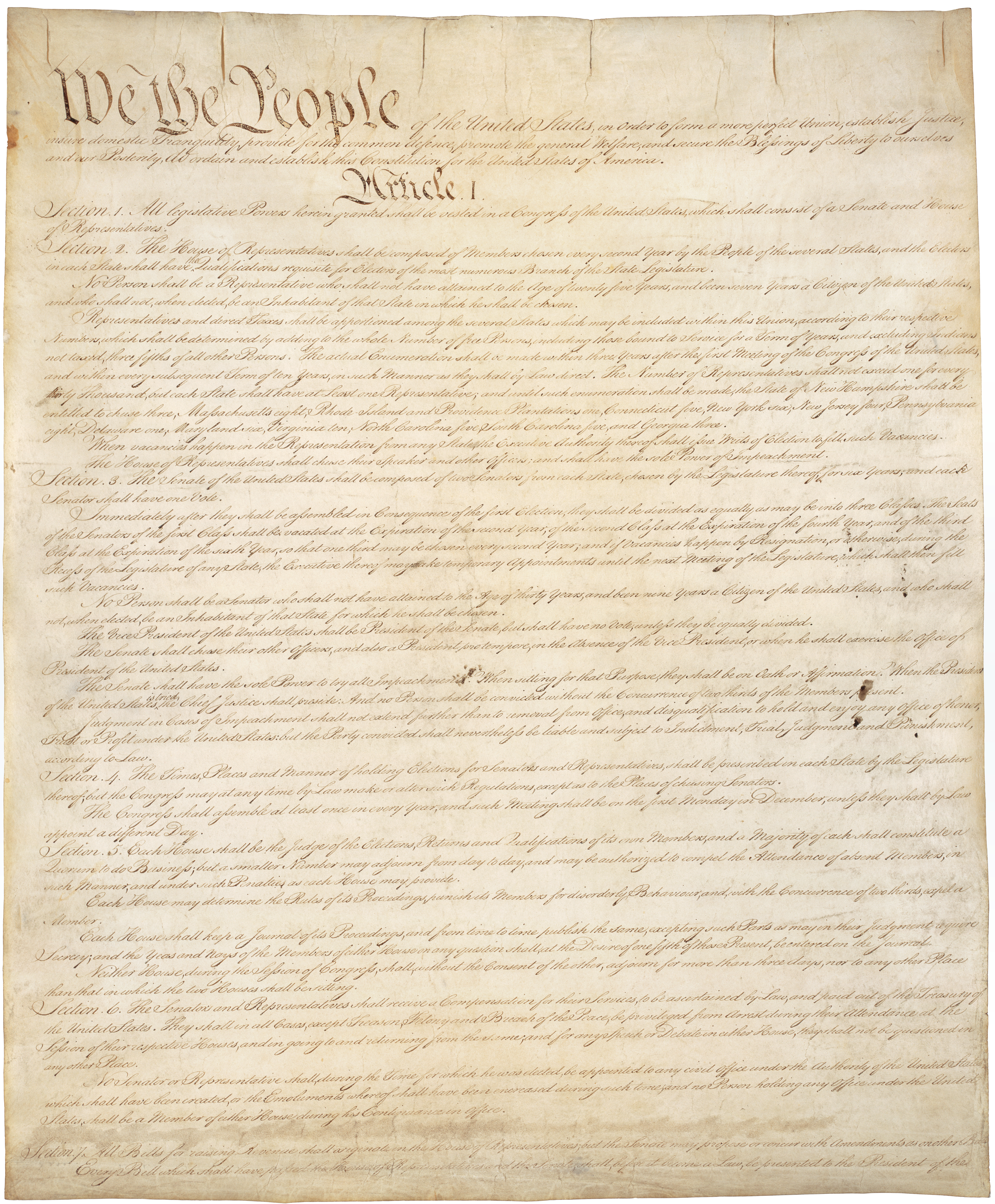
- Page one of Jacob Shallus' officially engrossed copy of the Constitution signed in Philadelphia by delegates of the Constitutional Convention in 1787

Overview
- Jurisdiction: United States
- Created: September 17, 1787
- Presented: September 28, 1787
- Ratified: June 21, 1788 (9 of 13 states)
- Date effective: March 4, 1789 (237 years ago) (Note: The federal government began operating under the new Constitution on that day. See 1st United States Congress.)
- System: Federal presidential republic

Government structure
- Branches: 3
- Chambers: Bicameral
- Executive: President
- Judiciary: Supreme, Circuits, Districts
- Federalism: Yes
- Electoral college: Yes
- Entrenchments: 2, 1 still active (Note: The first entrenchment clause restricted Congress from passing laws restricting the importation of slaves prior to 1808. The second entrenchment clause states that no state, without its consent, shall be deprived of its representation in the Senate.)

History
- First legislature: March 4, 1789 (11 of 13 states)
- First executive: April 30, 1789
- First court: February 2, 1790
- Amendments: 27 (Note: Thirty-three amendments have been proposed by Congress and sent to the states for ratification since the Constitution entered force in 1789; but only 27 have been ratified by the requisite number of states and become part of the Constitution.)
- Last amended: May 5, 1992
- Citation: The Constitution of the United States of America, As Amended (PDF), July 25, 2007
- Location: National Archives Building in Washington, D.C., U.S.
- Commissioned by: Congress of the Confederation in Philadelphia, U.S.
- Author: Philadelphia Convention
- Signatories: 39 of the 55 delegates
- Media type: Parchment
- Supersedes: Articles of Confederation

Full text
- Constitution of the United States of America at Wikisource

Reading of the United States Constitution of 1787

The Constitution of the United States is the supreme law of the United States of America. It superseded the Articles of Confederation, the nation's first constitution, on March 4, 1789. Originally including seven articles, the Constitution defined the foundational structure of the federal government.

The drafting of the Constitution by many of the nation's Founding Fathers, often referred to as its framing, was completed at the Constitutional Convention, which assembled at Independence Hall in Philadelphia between May 25 and September 17, 1787. Influenced by English common law and the Enlightenment liberalism of philosophers like John Locke and Montesquieu, the Constitution's first three articles embody the doctrine of the separation of powers, in which the federal government is divided into the legislative, bicameral Congress; (Note: Article I) the executive, led by the president; (Note: Article II) and the judiciary, within which the Supreme Court has apex jurisdiction. (Note: Article III) Articles IV, V, and VI embody concepts of federalism, describing the rights and responsibilities of state governments, the states in relationship to the federal government, and the process of constitutional amendment. Article VII establishes the procedure used to ratify the constitution.

Since the Constitution became operational in 1789, it has been amended 27 times. The first ten amendments, known collectively as the Bill of Rights, offer specific protections of individual liberty and justice and place restrictions on the powers of government within the U.S. states. Amendments 13–15 are known as the Reconstruction Amendments. The majority of the later amendments expand individual civil rights protections, with some addressing issues related to federal authority or modifying government processes and procedures. Amendments to the United States Constitution, unlike ones made to many constitutions worldwide, are appended to the document.

The Constitution of the United States is the oldest and longest-standing written and codified national constitution in force in the world. (Note: Other countries, such as the United Kingdom, Canada, and New Zealand, and other Commonwealth countries, have constitutional provisions such as the Bill of Rights 1689, among other statutes, that are older than the United States Constitution that are still in force to this day.) The first permanent constitution, (Note: Historically, the first written constitution of an independent polity which was adopted by representatives elected by the people was the 1755 Corsican Constitution, despite being short-lived, drafted by Pasquale Paoli, whose work was an inspiration for many American patriots, including the Hearts of Oak, originally named "The Corsicans", and the Sons of Liberty. Earlier written constitutions of independent states exist but were not adopted by bodies elected by the people, such as the Swedish Constitution of 1772, adopted by the king, the Constitution of San Marino of 1600 which is the oldest surviving constitution in the world, or the Constitution of Pylyp Orlyk, the first establishing separation of powers.) it has been interpreted, supplemented, and implemented by a large body of federal constitutional law and has influenced the constitutions of other nations.

== History ==
=== Background ===
From September 5, 1774, to March 1, 1781, the Second Continental Congress, convened in Philadelphia in Independence Hall, functioned as the provisional government of the United States. Delegates to the First Continental Congress in 1774 and then the Second Continental Congress from 1775 to 1781 were chosen largely from the revolutionary committees of correspondence in various colonies rather than through the colonial governments of the Thirteen Colonies.

The Articles of Confederation and Perpetual Union was the first constitution of the United States. The document was drafted by a committee appointed by the Second Continental Congress in mid-June 1777 and was adopted by the full Congress in mid-November of that year. Ratification by the 13 colonies took more than three years and was completed March 1, 1781. The Articles gave little power to the central government. While the Confederation Congress had some decision-making abilities, it lacked enforcement powers. The implementation of most decisions, including amendments to the Articles, required legislative approval by all 13 of the newly formed states.

Despite these limitations, based on the Congressional authority granted in Article 9, the league of states was considered as strong as any similar republican confederation ever formed. The chief problem was, in the words of George Washington, "no money". The Confederated Congress could print money, but it was worthless, and while the Congress could borrow money, it could not pay it back. No state paid its share of taxes to support the government, and some paid nothing. A few states met the interest payments toward the national debt owed by their citizens, but nothing greater, and no interest was paid on debts owed to foreign governments. By 1786, the United States was facing default on its outstanding debts.

Under the Articles, the United States had little ability to defend its sovereignty. Most of the troops in the nation's 625-man army were deployed facing non-threatening British forts on American soil. Soldiers were not being paid, some were deserting, and others were threatening mutiny. Spain closed New Orleans to American commerce, despite the protests of U.S. officials. When Barbary pirates began seizing American ships of commerce, the Treasury had no funds to pay toward ransom. If a military crisis required action, the Congress had no credit or taxing power to finance a response.

Domestically, the Articles of Confederation was failing to bring unity to the diverse sentiments and interests of the various states. Although the Treaty of Paris in 1783 was signed between Britain and the U.S., and named each of the American states, various states proceeded to violate it. New York and South Carolina repeatedly prosecuted Loyalists for wartime activity and redistributed their lands. Individual state legislatures independently laid embargoes, negotiated directly with foreign authorities, raised armies, and made war, all violating the letter and the spirit of the Articles.

In September 1786, during the inter–state Annapolis convention to discuss and develop a consensus about reversing the protectionist trade barriers that each state had erected, James Madison questioned whether the Articles of Confederation was a binding compact or even a viable government. Connecticut paid nothing and "positively refused" to pay U.S. assessments for two years. A rumor at the time was that a seditious party of New York legislators had opened a conversation with the Viceroy of Canada. To the south, the British were said to be openly funding Creek Indian raids on Georgia, and the state was under martial law. Additionally, during Shays' Rebellion (August 1786 – June 1787) in Massachusetts, Congress could provide no money to support an endangered constituent state. General Benjamin Lincoln was obliged to raise funds from Boston merchants to pay for a volunteer army.

Congress could do nothing significant without nine states, and some legislation required all 13. When a state produced only one member in attendance, its vote was not counted. If a state's delegation was evenly divided, its vote could not be counted towards the nine-count requirement. The Congress of the Confederation had "virtually ceased trying to govern". The vision of a respectable nation among nations seemed to be fading in the eyes of revolutionaries such as George Washington, Benjamin Franklin, and Rufus King. Their dream of a republic, a nation without hereditary rulers, with power derived from the people in frequent elections, was in doubt.

On February 21, 1787, the Confederation Congress called a convention of state delegates in Philadelphia to propose revisions to the Articles. Unlike earlier attempts, the convention was not meant for new laws or piecemeal alterations, but for the "sole and express purpose of revising the Articles of Confederation". The convention was not limited to commerce but intended to "render the federal constitution adequate to the exigencies of government and the preservation of the Union".

=== 1787 drafting ===
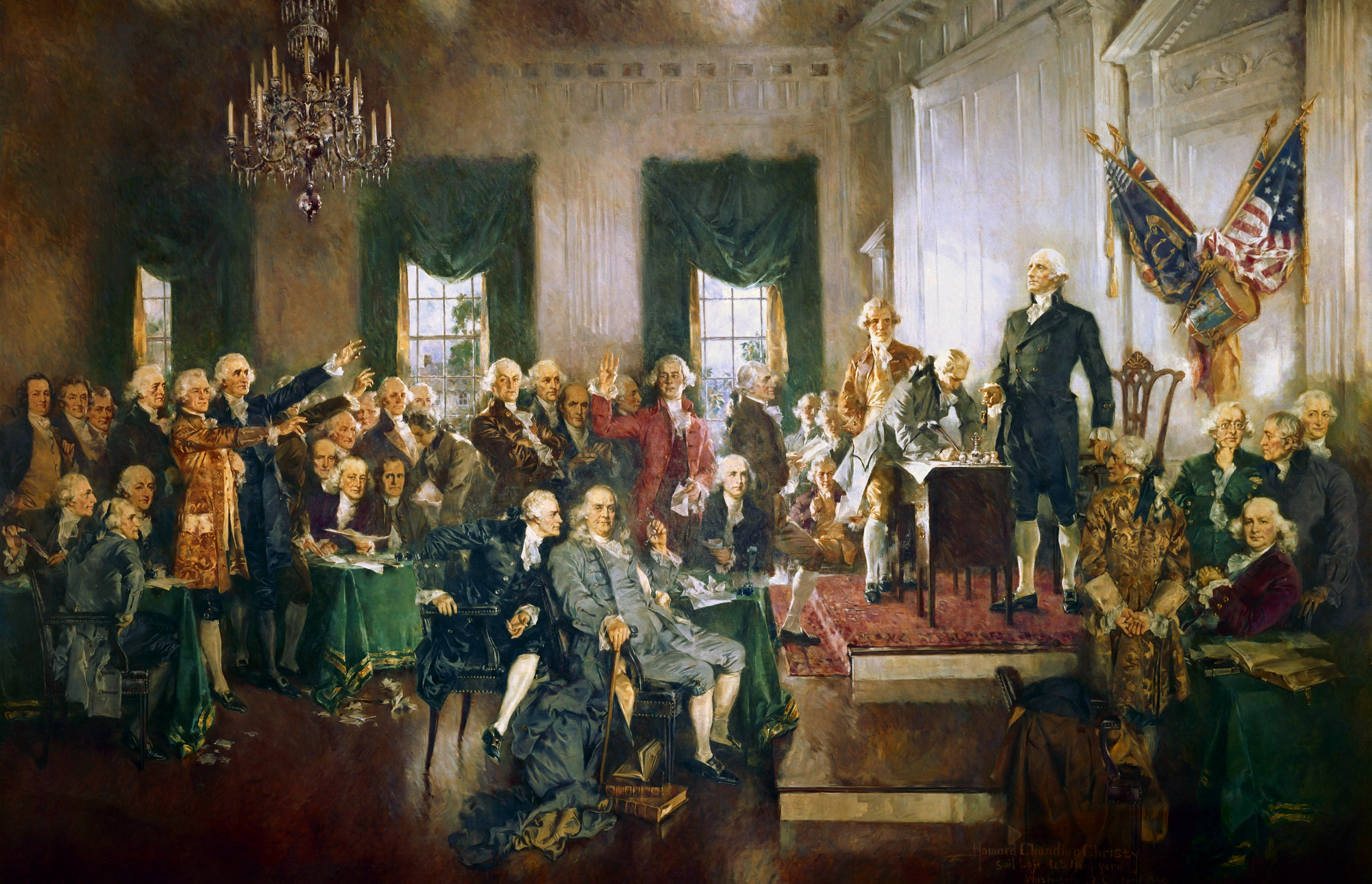
Scene at the Signing of the Constitution of the United States on September 17, 1787, a 1940 portrait by Howard Chandler Christy depicting the signing of the Constitution in Philadelphia

On the appointed day, May 14, 1787, only the Virginia and Pennsylvania delegations were present, and the convention's opening meeting was postponed for lack of a quorum. A quorum of seven states met on May 25, and deliberations began. Eventually 12 states were represented, with Rhode Island refusing to participate. Of the 74 delegates appointed by the states, 55 attended. The convention's initial mandate was limited to amending the Articles of Confederation, which had proven highly ineffective in meeting the young nation's needs. Almost immediately, however, the delegates began considering measures to replace the Articles of Confederation.

Two plans for structuring the federal government arose shortly after the convention's outset:

- The first proposal discussed, introduced by delegates from Virginia, was known as the Virginia Plan, Large State Plan, or the Randolph Plan. It called for a bicameral Congress that was to be elected on a proportional basis based on state population, an elected chief executive, and an appointed judicial branch. Generally favoring the most highly populated states, it used the philosophy of John Locke to rely on consent of the governed, Montesquieu for divided government, and Edward Coke to emphasize civil liberties.
- The alternative to the Virginia Plan, known as the New Jersey Plan, also called for an elected executive but retained the legislative structure created by the Articles, a unicameral Congress where all states had one vote. Generally favoring the less-populous states, it used the philosophy of English Whigs, such as Edmund Burke, to rely on received procedure and the jurist William Blackstone to emphasize sovereignty of the legislature. This position reflected the belief that the states were independent entities and, as they entered the United States of America freely and individually, remained so.

On May 31, the Convention devolved into the Committee of the Whole, charged with considering the Virginia Plan. On June 13, the Virginia resolutions in amended form were reported out of committee. The New Jersey Plan was put forward in response to the Virginia Plan.

On June 19, 1787, delegates rejected the New Jersey Plan with three states voting in favor, seven against, and one divided. The plan's defeat led to a series of compromises centering primarily on two issues: slavery and proportional representation. (Note: Not to be confused with proportional representation, an electoral system that typically elects multiple members of a party to a legislature based on that party's percentage of a popular vote.)

==== Scope of judicial power ====
Proposals by Madison (Virginia) and Wilson (Pennsylvania) called for a supreme court veto over national legislation. This proposal resembled the system in New York, where the Constitution of 1777 called for a "Council of Revision" by the governor and justices of the state supreme court, which council would review and veto any passed legislation. Madison's proposal was defeated three times and replaced by a presidential veto with congressional override.

The justification for judicial review is to be explicitly found in the open ratifications held in the states and reported in their newspapers. John Marshall in Virginia, James Wilson in Pennsylvania and Oliver Ellsworth of Connecticut all argued for Supreme Court judicial review of acts of state legislature. In Federalist No. 78, Alexander Hamilton advocated the doctrine of a written document held as a superior enactment of the people. "A limited constitution can be preserved in practice no other way" than through courts which can declare void any legislation contrary to the Constitution. The preservation of the people's authority over legislatures rests "particularly with judges." (Note: The Supreme Court found 658 cases of invalid state statutes from 1790 to 1941 before the advent of civil rights cases in the last half of the twentieth century)

==== Connecticut and Three-Fifths Compromise ====
The issue of proportional representation was of concern to less populous states, which under the Articles had the same power as larger states. From July 2 to 16, a Committee of Eleven, including one delegate from each state represented, met to work out a compromise on the issue of representation in the federal legislature. All agreed to a republican form of government grounded in representing the people in the states. For the legislature, two issues were to be decided: (i) how the votes were to be allocated among the states in the Congress, and (ii) how the representatives should be elected. In its report, later known as the Connecticut Compromise (or "Great Compromise"), the committee proposed proportional representation for seats in the House of Representatives based on population (with the people voting for representatives), equal representation for each state in the Senate (with each state's legislators generally choosing their respective senators), and that all money bills would originate in the House.

The Great Compromise ended the stalemate between patriots and nationalists, leading to numerous other compromises in a spirit of accommodation. The issue of slavery pitted Northern states, where slavery was slowly being abolished, against Southern states, whose agricultural economies depended on slave labor. To satisfy interests in the South, the delegates agreed to protect the slave trade for 20 years. Slavery was protected further by the Three-Fifths Compromise, which allowed states to count three-fifths of their slaves as part of their populations, for the purpose of representation in the federal government, and by requiring the return of escaped slaves to their owners, even if captured in states where slavery had been abolished. Further compromises were also made on presidential term, powers, and method of selection, as well as the jurisdiction of the federal judiciary.

While these compromises held the Union together and aided the Constitution's ratification, slavery continued for eight more decades, and less populous states continue to have disproportional representation in the U.S. Senate and Electoral College.

==== Drafting and signature ====
On July 24, a Committee of Detail, including John Rutledge (South Carolina), Edmund Randolph (Virginia), Nathaniel Gorham (Massachusetts), Oliver Ellsworth (Connecticut), and James Wilson (Pennsylvania), was elected to draft a detailed constitution reflective of the resolutions passed by the convention up to that point. The Convention recessed from July 26 to August 6 to await the report of this "Committee of Detail". Overall, the report of the committee conformed to the resolutions adopted by the convention, adding some elements. A twenty-three article (plus preamble) constitution was presented.

From August 6 to September 10, the report of the committee of detail was discussed, section by section and clause by clause. Details were attended to, and further compromises were effected. Toward the close of these discussions, on September 8, a Committee of Style and Arrangement, including Alexander Hamilton from New York, William Samuel Johnson from Connecticut, Rufus King from Massachusetts, James Madison from Virginia, and Gouverneur Morris from Pennsylvania, was appointed to distill a final draft constitution from the 23 approved articles. The final draft, presented to the convention on September 12, contained seven articles, a preamble and a closing endorsement, of which Morris was the primary author. The committee also presented a proposed letter to accompany the constitution when delivered to Congress.

The original U.S. Constitution was handwritten on five pages of parchment by Jacob Shallus. The final document was taken up on Monday, September 17, at the convention's final session. Several of the delegates were disappointed in the result, a makeshift series of unfortunate compromises. Some delegates left before the ceremony and three others refused to sign. Of the thirty-nine signers, Benjamin Franklin summed up, addressing the convention: "There are several parts of this Constitution which I do not at present approve, but I am not sure I shall never approve them." He would accept the Constitution, "because I expect no better and because I am not sure that it is not the best".

The advocates of the Constitution were anxious to obtain unanimous support of all twelve states represented in the convention. Their accepted formula for the closing endorsement was "Done in Convention, by the unanimous consent of the States present". At the end of the convention, the proposal was agreed to by eleven state delegations and the lone remaining delegate from New York, Alexander Hamilton.

=== Ratification by the states ===
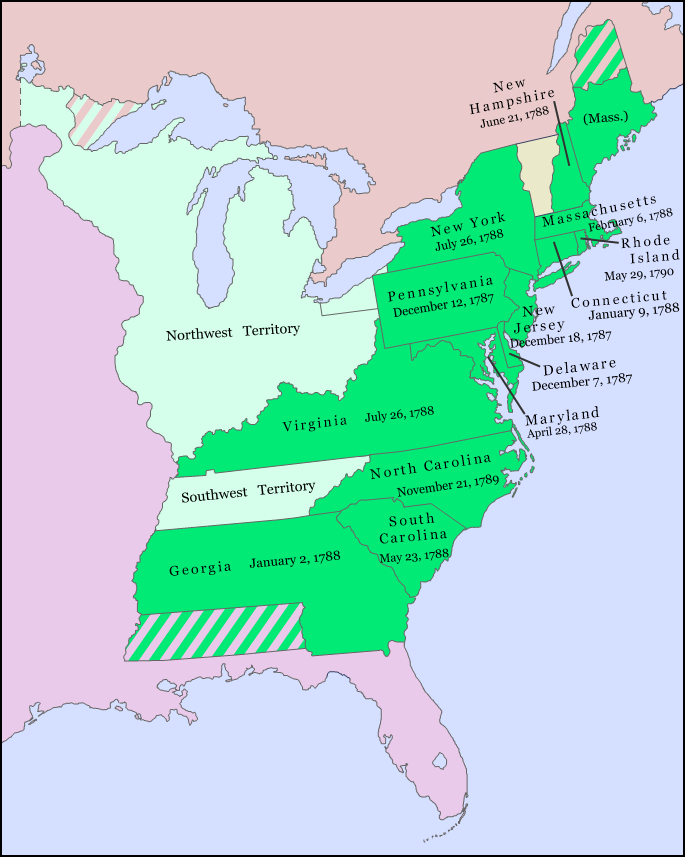
Dates the 13 original U.S. states ratified the Constitution

Within three days of its signing on September 17, 1787, the Constitution was submitted to the Congress of the Confederation, then sitting in New York City, the nation's temporary capital. The document, originally intended as a revision of the Articles of Confederation, instead introduced a completely new form of government. While members of Congress had the power to reject it, they voted unanimously on September 28 to forward the proposal to the thirteen states for their ratification. Under the process outlined in Article VII of the proposed Constitution, the state legislatures were tasked with organizing "Federal Conventions" to ratify the document. This process ignored the amendment provision of the Articles of Confederation which required unanimous approval of all the states. Instead, Article VII called for ratification by just nine of the 13 states—a two-thirds majority.

Two factions soon emerged, one supporting the Constitution, the Federalists, and the other opposing it, the so-called Anti-Federalists. Over the ensuing months, the proposal was debated, criticized, and expounded upon clause by clause. In the state of New York, at the time a hotbed of anti-Federalism, three delegates from the Philadelphia Convention who were also members of the Congress—Hamilton, Madison, and Jay—published a series of commentaries known as The Federalist Papers, in support of ratification.

Before year's end, three state legislatures voted in favor of ratification. Delaware was first, voting unanimously 30–0; Pennsylvania second, approving the measure 46–23; and New Jersey third, also recording a unanimous vote. As 1788 began, Connecticut and Georgia followed Delaware's lead with almost unanimous votes, but the outcome became less certain as leaders in key states such as Virginia, New York, and Massachusetts expressed concerns over the lack of protections for people's rights. Fearing the prospect of defeat, the Federalists relented, promising that if the Constitution was adopted, amendments would be added to secure individual liberties. With that, the anti-Federalists' position collapsed.

On June 21, 1788, New Hampshire became the ninth state to ratify. Three months later, on September 17, the Congress of the Confederation certified the ratification of eleven states, and passed resolutions setting dates for choosing the first senators and representatives, the first Wednesday of January (January 7, 1789); electing the first president, the first Wednesday of February (February 4); and officially starting the new government, the first Wednesday of March (March 4), when the first Congress would convene in New York City. As its final act, the Congress of Confederation agreed to acquire 100 square miles of land from Maryland and Virginia for establishing a permanent capital.

North Carolina waited to ratify the Constitution until after the Bill of Rights was passed by the new Congress, and Rhode Island's ratification would only come after a threatened trade embargo.

=== Aftermath ===
==== Federal judiciary ====
The Supreme Court was initially made up of jurists who had been intimately connected with the framing of the Constitution and the establishment of its government as law. John Jay (New York), a co-author of The Federalist Papers, served as chief justice for the first six years. The second chief justice, John Rutledge (South Carolina), was appointed by Washington in 1795 as a recess appointment, but was not confirmed by the Senate. Resigning later that year, he was succeeded in 1796 by the third chief justice, Oliver Ellsworth (Connecticut). Both Rutledge and Ellsworth were delegates to the Constitutional Convention. John Marshall (Virginia), the fourth chief justice, had served in the Virginia Ratification Convention in 1788. His 34 years of service on the Court would see some of the most important rulings to help establish the nation the Constitution had begun. Other early members of the Supreme Court who had been delegates to the Constitutional Convention included James Wilson (Pennsylvania) for ten years, and John Blair Jr. (Virginia) for five years.

Section 1, Article 3 provides that Congress can create lower (or "inferior") courts. The Judiciary Act of 1789 saw Congress's first exercise of such power. Title 28 of the U.S. Code describes judicial powers and administration. As of the First Congress, the Supreme Court justices rode circuit to sit as panels to hear appeals from the district courts. (Note: The Judiciary Act of 1789 established six Supreme Court justices. The number was periodically increased, reaching ten in 1863, allowing Lincoln additional appointments. After the Civil War, vacancies reduced the number to seven. Congress finally fixed the number at nine.) In 1891, Congress enacted a new system, where district courts would have original jurisdiction; intermediate appellate circuit courts with exclusive jurisdiction heard regional appeals before consideration by the Supreme Court; and the Supreme Court holds discretionary jurisdiction.

No part of the Constitution expressly authorizes judicial review, but the framers did contemplate the idea, and precedent has since established that the courts could exercise judicial review over the actions of Congress or the executive branch. To establish a federal system of national law, considerable effort goes into developing a spirit of comity between federal government and states. By the doctrine of res judicata, federal courts give "full faith and credit" to State Courts. (Note: For instance, 'collateral estoppel' directs that when a litigant wins in a state court, they cannot sue in federal court to get a more favorable outcome.) The Supreme Court will decide Constitutional issues of state law only on a case-by-case basis, and only by strict Constitutional necessity, independent of state legislators' motives, their policy outcomes or its national wisdom. (Note: Recently numerous habeas corpus reforms have tried to preserve a working "relationship of comity" and simultaneously streamline the process for state and lower courts to apply Supreme Court interpretations.) Two conflicting federal laws are under "pendent" jurisdiction if one presents a strict constitutional issue. Federal court jurisdiction is rare when a state legislature enacts something as under federal jurisdiction. (Note: Judicial Review is explained in Hamilton's Federalist No. 78. It also has roots in Natural Law expressions in the Declaration of Independence. The Supreme Court first ruled an act of Congress unconstitutional in Marbury v. Madison, the second was Dred Scott.)

==== Amendments ====
Clauses 4 and 9 of Article One, Section 9 were explicitly shielded from Constitutional amendment prior to 1808. On January 1, 1808, the first day it was permitted to do so, Congress approved legislation prohibiting the importation of slaves into the country. On February 3, 1913, with ratification of the Sixteenth Amendment, Congress gained the authority to levy an income tax without apportioning it among the states or basing it on the United States Census.

== Influences ==
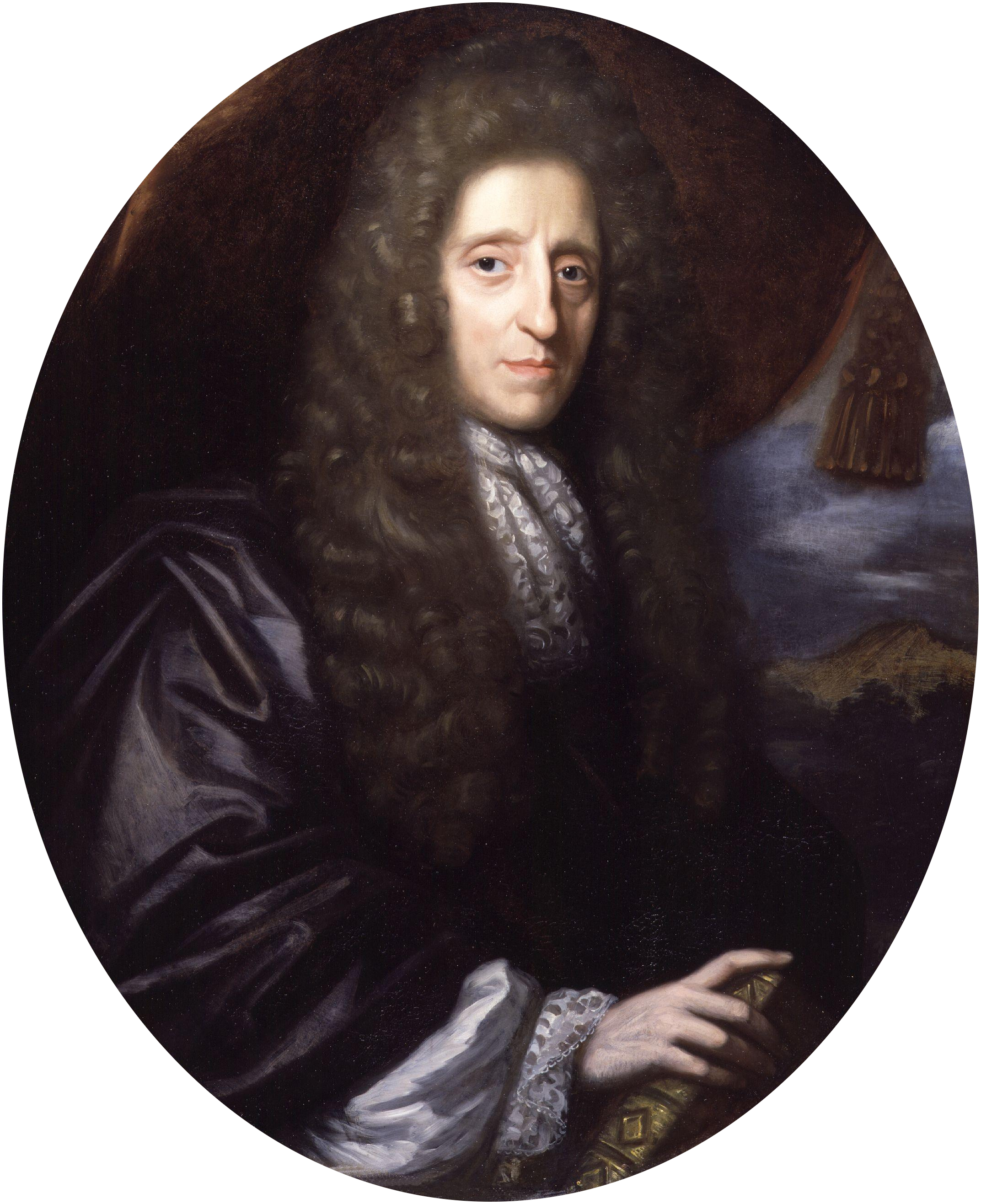
John Locke, author of Two Treatises of Government

The U.S. Constitution was a federal one and was greatly influenced by the study of Magna Carta and other federations, both ancient and extant. The Due Process Clause of the Constitution was partly based on common law and on Magna Carta (1215), which had become a foundation of English liberty against arbitrary power wielded by a ruler. The idea of Separation of Powers inherent in the Constitution was largely inspired by eighteenth-century Enlightenment philosophers, such as Montesquieu and John Locke.

The influence of Montesquieu, Locke, Edward Coke and William Blackstone was evident at the Constitutional Convention. Prior to and during the framing and signing of the Constitution, Blackstone, Hume, Locke and Montesquieu were among the political philosophers most frequently referred to. James Madison, for example made frequent reference to Blackstone, Locke, and Montesquieu, who were among the most prominent political theorists of the late eighteenth century.

While the ideas of unalienable rights, the separation of powers and the structure of the Constitution were largely influenced by the European Enlightenment thinkers, like Montesquieu, John Locke and others, Benjamin Franklin and Thomas Jefferson still had reservations about the existing forms of government in Europe. In a speech at the Constitutional Convention Franklin stated, "We have gone back to ancient history for models of Government, and examined different forms of those Republics ... And we have viewed modern States all round Europe but find none of their Constitutions suitable to our circumstances." Jefferson maintained, that most European governments were autocratic monarchies and not compatible with the egalitarian character of the American people.

=== English law ===
Historian Jack P. Greene maintains that by 1776 the founders drew heavily upon Magna Carta and the later writings of "Enlightenment rationalism" and English common law.

In his Institutes of the Lawes of England, Coke interpreted Magna Carta protections and rights to apply not just to nobles, but to all British subjects. In writing the Virginia Charter of 1606, he enabled the King in Parliament to give those to be born in the colonies all rights and liberties as though they were born in England. William Blackstone's Commentaries on the Laws of England are considered the most influential books on law in the new republic.

The English Bill of Rights (1689) was an inspiration for the American Bill of Rights. Both require jury trials, contain a right to keep and bear arms, prohibit excessive bail and forbid "cruel and unusual punishments". Many liberties protected by state constitutions and the Virginia Declaration of Rights were incorporated into the Bill of Rights. Upon the arrival of the American Revolution, many of the rights guaranteed by the Federal Bill of Rights were recognized as being inspired by English law. A substantial body of thought had been developed from the literature of republicanism in the United States, typically demonstrated by the works of John Adams, who often quoted Blackstone and Montesquieu verbatim, and applied to the creation of state constitutions.

=== Enlightenment philosophy ===
Historian Herbert W. Schneider held that the Scottish Enlightenment was "probably the most potent single tradition in the American Enlightenment" and the advancement of personal liberties. Historian Daniel Walker Howe notes that Benjamin Franklin greatly admired David Hume, an eighteenth-century Scottish philosopher, and had studied many of his works while at Edinburgh in 1760. Both embraced the idea that high-ranking public officials should receive no salary and that the lower class was a better judge of character when it came to choosing their representatives.

Following the Glorious Revolution of 1688, British political philosopher John Locke was a major influence, expanding on the contract theory of government advanced by Thomas Hobbes, his contemporary. Locke advanced the principle of consent of the governed in his Two Treatises of Government. Government's duty under a social contract among the sovereign people was to serve the people by protecting their rights. These basic rights were life, liberty, and property.

Montesquieu's influence on the framers is evident in Madison's Federalist No. 47 and Hamilton's Federalist No. 78. Thomas Jefferson, Adams, and Mason were known to read Montesquieu. Montesquieu emphasized the need for balanced forces pushing against each other to prevent tyranny (reflecting the influence of Polybius's 2nd century BC treatise on the checks and balances of the Roman Republic). In his The Spirit of Law, Montesquieu maintained that the separation of state powers should be by its service to the people's liberty: legislative, executive and judicial, while also emphasizing that the idea of separation had for its purpose the even distribution of authority among the several branches of government.

Supreme Court Justices, the ultimate interpreters of the constitution, have also cited Montesquieu throughout the Court's history. (See, e.g., Green v. Biddle, 21 U.S. 1, 1, 36 (1823). United States v. Wood, 39 U.S. 430, 438 (1840). Myers v. United States, 272 U.S. 52, 116 (1926). Nixon v. Administrator of General Services, 433 U.S. 425, 442 (1977). Bank Markazi v. Peterson, 136 U.S. 1310, 1330 (2016).)

=== Haudenosaunee ===
American Indian history scholars Donald Grinde and Bruce Johansen claim there is "overwhelming evidence" that Haudenosaunee (Iroquois) Confederacy political concepts and ideas influenced the U.S. Constitution, and are considered to be the most outspoken supporters of the Haudenosaunee thesis. The idea as to the extent of that influence on the founding, however, varies among historians and has been questioned or criticized by various historians, including Samuel Payne, William Starna, George Hamell, and historian and archaeologist Philip Levy, who claims the evidence is largely coincidental and circumstantial. The most outspoken critic, anthropologist Elisabeth Tooker, claimed the Haudenosaunee influence thesis is largely the product of "white interpretations of Indians" and "scholarly misapprehension".

John Napoleon Brinton Hewitt, who was born on the Tuscarora Indian Reservation, and was an ethnologist at the Smithsonian Institution's Bureau of Ethnology is often cited by historians of Haudenosaunee history. Hewitt, however, rejected the idea that the Haudenosaunee League had a major influence on the Albany Plan of Union, Benjamin Franklin's plan to create a unified government for the Thirteen Colonies, which was rejected.

== Structure ==
The Constitution includes four sections: an introductory paragraph titled Preamble, a list of seven Articles that define the government's framework, an untitled closing endorsement with the signatures of 39 framers. 27 amendments have also been adopted under Article V.

=== Preamble ===
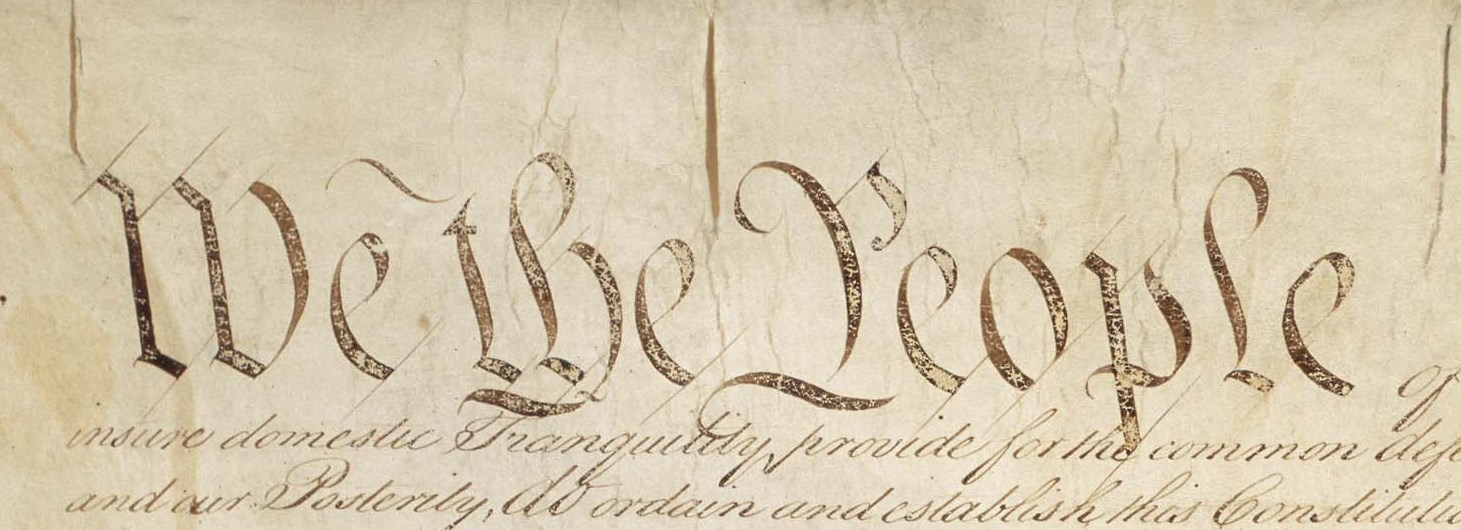
"We the People" in its original edition

Reading of the 1787 United States Constitution

The Preamble, the Constitution's introductory paragraph, lays out the purposes of the new government:

We the People of the United States, in Order to form a more perfect Union, establish Justice, insure domestic Tranquility, provide for the common defence, promote the general Welfare, and secure the Blessings of Liberty to ourselves and our Posterity, do ordain and establish this Constitution for the United States of America.

The opening words, "We the People", represented a new thought: the idea that the people and not the states were the source of the government's legitimacy. Coined by Gouverneur Morris of Pennsylvania, who chaired the convention's Committee of Style, the phrase is considered an improvement on the section's original draft which followed the words We the People with a list of the 13 states. In place of the names of the states Morris substituted "of the United States" and then listed the Constitution's six goals, none of which were mentioned originally.

=== Closing endorsement ===
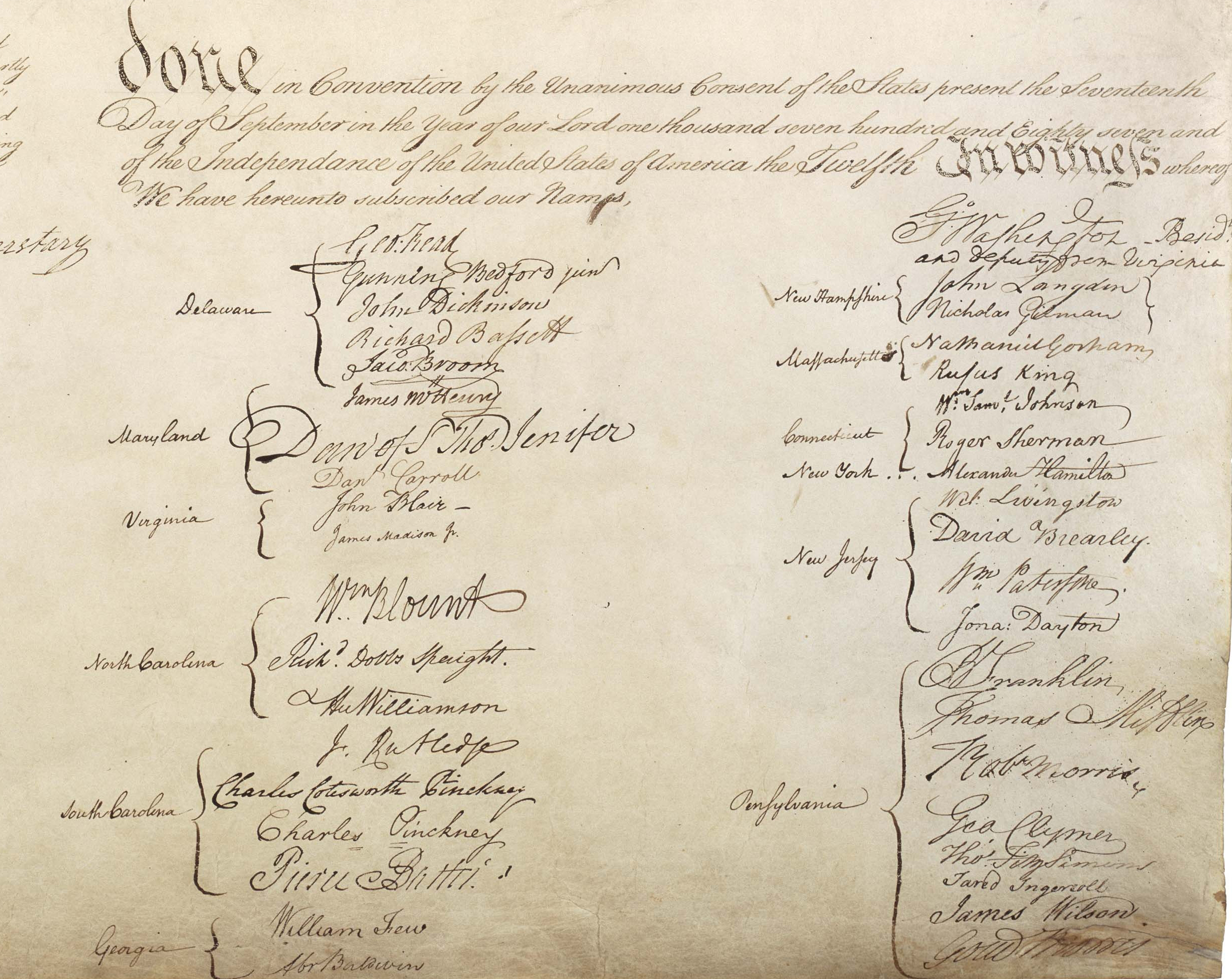
The signatures in the closing endorsement section of the United States Constitution

The signing of the United States Constitution occurred on September 17, 1787, when 39 delegates endorsed the constitution created during the convention. In addition to signatures, this closing endorsement, the Constitution's eschatocol, included a brief declaration that the delegates' work has been successfully completed and that those whose signatures appear on it subscribe to the final document. Included are a statement pronouncing the document's adoption by the states present, a formulaic dating of its adoption, and the delegates' signatures. Additionally, the convention's secretary, William Jackson, added a note to verify four amendments made by hand to the final document, and signed the note to authenticate its validity.

The language of the concluding endorsement, conceived by Gouverneur Morris and presented to the convention by Benjamin Franklin, was made intentionally ambiguous in hopes of winning over the votes of dissenting delegates. Advocates for the new frame of government, realizing the impending difficulty of obtaining the consent of the states needed to make it operational, were anxious to obtain the unanimous support of the delegations from each state. It was feared that many of the delegates would refuse to give their individual assent to the Constitution. Therefore, in order that the action of the convention would appear to be unanimous, the formula, Done in convention by the unanimous consent of the states present ... was devised.

== Articles ==
The Constitution's main provisions include seven articles that define the basic framework of the federal government. Articles that have been amended still include the original text, although provisions repealed by amendments under Article V are usually bracketed or italicized to indicate they no longer apply.

=== Article I – The Legislature ===
Article I describes the Congress, the legislative branch of the federal government: Congress comprises both the Senate and House of Representatives; (Note: Section 1) members of both houses are subject to age, citizenship, and state residency requirements; (Note: Section 2) and are elected by the people of a state. (Note: Section 2)

Section 3, Clause 1 provides for equal representation of the states in the Senate. Section 8 enumerates the powers delegated to the legislature and includes broad provisions such as the General Welfare Clause (also known as the Taxing and Spending Clause), Commerce Clause, and Necessary and Proper Clause.

Section 9 lists eight specific limits on congressional power. In McCulloch v. Maryland (1819), the Supreme Court read the Necessary and Proper Clause to permit the federal government to take action that would "enable [it] to perform the high duties assigned to it [by the Constitution] in the manner most beneficial to the people," even if that action is not itself within the enumerated powers. Section 9, Clause 1 prevents Congress from passing any law that would restrict the importation of slaves into the United States prior to 1808. Clause 4 holds that direct taxes must be apportioned according to state populations.

=== Article II – The Executive ===
Article II describes the office, qualifications, and duties of the president of the United States and the vice president. The article is modified by the 12th Amendment, which regulates presidential elections, and the 25th Amendment, relating to office succession.

The president is head of the executive branch of the federal government; the nation's head of state and head of government; and the Commander in Chief of the United States Armed Forces, as well as of state militias when they are mobilized. The president makes treaties with the advice and consent of the Senate. To administer the federal government, the president commissions all the offices of the federal government as Congress directs; and may require the opinions of its principal officers and make "recess appointments" for vacancies that may happen during the recess of the Senate. The president ensures the laws are faithfully executed and may grant reprieves and pardons with the exception of Congressional impeachment. The president reports to Congress on the State of the Union, and by the Recommendation Clause, recommends "necessary and expedient" national measures. The president may convene and adjourn Congress under special circumstances.

Section 4 provides for the removal of the president and other federal officers. The president is removed on impeachment for, and conviction of, treason, bribery, or other high crimes and misdemeanors.

=== Article III – The Judiciary ===
Article III describes the court system, including the Supreme Court. Section 1 vests the judicial power of the United States in federal courts and, with it, the authority to interpret and apply the law to particular cases. Also included is the power to punish, sentence, and direct future action to resolve conflicts. Implied powers under Article III include the enforcement of judicial decisions through criminal contempt and civil contempt powers; injunctive relief and the habeas corpus remedy; and the ability to imprison for contumacy, bad-faith litigation, and failure to obey a writ of mandamus.

Clause 1 of Section 2, known as the Case or Controversy Clause, authorizes the federal courts to hear actual cases and controversies only. Their judicial power does not extend to cases that are hypothetical, or which are proscribed due to standing, mootness, or ripeness issues. Generally, a case or controversy requires the presence of adverse parties who have some interest genuinely at stake in the case. (Note: The four concepts which determine "justiciability", the formula for a federal court taking and deciding a case, are the doctrines of (a) standing, (b) real and substantial interests, (c) adversity, and (d) avoidance of political questions.) Section 2 also protects the right to trial by jury in all criminal cases. Section 3 bars Congress from changing or modifying Federal law on treason by simple majority. This section also defines treason as an overt act of making war or materially helping those at war with the United States. (Note: Contrary to this source when viewed, the Constitution provides that punishments, including forfeiture of income and property, must apply to the person convicted. "No attainder of treason shall work corruption of blood or forfeiture" on the convicted traitor's children or heirs. This avoids the perpetuation of civil war into the generations by Parliamentary majorities as in the Wars of the Roses.)

=== Article IV – The States ===
Article IV outlines the relations among the states and between each state and the federal government. It also provides for such matters as admitting new states, border changes between the states, and extradition between the states, as well as laying down a legal basis for freedom of movement and travel among the states.

The Full Faith and Credit Clause requires states to recognise the public acts, records, and court proceedings of the other states. Congress is permitted to regulate the manner in which proof of such acts may be admitted. The "privileges and immunities" clause prohibits state governments from discriminating against citizens of other states in favor of resident citizens. For instance, in criminal sentencing, a state may not increase a penalty on the grounds that the convicted person is a non-resident. The Territorial Clause gives Congress the power to make rules for disposing of federal property and governing non-state territories of the United States. Finally, the fourth section of Article Four requires the United States to guarantee to each state a republican form of government and to protect them from invasion and violence.

=== Article V – Amendment Process ===
Article V outlines the process for amending the Constitution. The Articles of Confederation provided that amendments were to be proposed by Congress and ratified by the unanimous vote of all 13 state legislatures. This proved to be a major flaw in the Articles, as it created an insurmountable obstacle to constitutional reform. The amendment process crafted during the Philadelphia Constitutional Convention was, according to Federalist No. 43, designed to establish a balance between pliancy and rigidity. Article Five ends by shielding certain clauses in the Constitution from being amended.

=== Article VI – Federal Powers ===
Article VI establishes that the Constitution and all federal laws and treaties made in accordance with it have supremacy over state laws, and that "the judges in every state shall be bound thereby, any thing in the laws or constitutions of any state notwithstanding". It validates national debt created under the Articles of Confederation and requires that all federal and state legislators, officers, and judges take oaths or affirmations to support the Constitution. This means that the states' constitutions and laws should not conflict with the laws of the federal constitution and that in case of a conflict, state judges are legally bound to honor the federal laws and constitution over those of any state. Article Six also states "no religious Test shall ever be required as a Qualification to any Office or public Trust under the United States".

=== Article VII – Ratification ===
Article VII describes the process for establishing the proposed new frame of government. Anticipating that the influence of many state politicians would be Antifederalist, delegates to the Philadelphia Convention provided for ratification of the Constitution by popularly elected ratifying conventions in each state. The convention method also made it possible that judges, ministers and others ineligible to serve in state legislatures, could be elected to a convention. Suspecting that Rhode Island, at least, might not ratify, delegates decided that the Constitution would go into effect as soon as nine states (two-thirds rounded up) ratified. Each of the remaining four states could then join the newly formed union by ratifying.

== Amendments ==
The United States Bill of Rights, currently housed in the National Archives in Washington, D.C.

The procedure for amending the Constitution is outlined in Article V and is currently overseen by the archivist of the United States. Between 1949 and 1985, it was overseen by the administrator of General Services, and before that by the secretary of state.

Under Article V, a proposal for an amendment must be adopted either by two-thirds of both houses of Congress or by a national convention that had been requested by two-thirds of the state legislatures. Following this, Congress decides whether the proposed amendment is to be ratified by state legislatures or state ratifying conventions. The proposed amendment along with the method of ratification is sent to the Office of the Federal Register, which copies it in slip law format and submits it to the states. To date, the convention method of proposal has never been tried and the convention method of ratification has only been used once, for the Twenty-first Amendment.

A proposed amendment becomes an operative part of the Constitution as soon as it is ratified by three-fourths of the States (currently 38 of the 50 states). After ratification no additional action by Congress or anyone else is required. When the Office of the Federal Register verifies that it has received the required number of authenticated ratification documents, it drafts a formal proclamation for the Archivist to certify that the amendment is valid. This certification is published in the Federal Register and United States Statutes at Large and serves as official notice to Congress and the nation that the ratification process has been completed.

The Constitution has twenty-seven amendments. Structurally, the Constitution's original text and all prior amendments remain untouched. The precedent for this practice was set in 1789, when Congress considered and proposed the first several Constitutional amendments. Among these, Amendments 1–10 are collectively known as the Bill of Rights, and Amendments 13–15 are known as the Reconstruction Amendments. Excluding the Twenty-seventh Amendment, which was pending before the states for 202 years, 225 days, the longest pending amendment that was successfully ratified was the Twenty-second Amendment, which took 3 years, 343 days. The Twenty-sixth Amendment was ratified in the shortest time, 100 days. The average ratification time for the first twenty-six amendments was 1 year, 252 days; for all twenty-seven, 9 years, 48 days.

The first ten Amendments introduced were referred to as the Bill of Rights which consists of 10 amendments that were added to the Constitution in 1791, as supporters of the Constitution had promised critics during the debates of 1788.

=== Bill of Rights (1791) ===
==== First Amendment ====
The First Amendment prohibits Congress from obstructing the exercise of certain individual freedoms: freedom of religion, freedom of speech, freedom of the press, freedom of assembly, and right to petition. Its Free Exercise Clause guarantees a person's right to hold whatever religious beliefs they want, and to freely exercise that belief; its Establishment Clause prevents the federal government from creating an official national church or favoring one set of religious beliefs over another.

==== Second Amendment ====
The Second Amendment protects the right of individuals to keep and bear arms. The Supreme Court has ruled that this right applies to individuals, not merely to collective militias. It has also held that the government may regulate or place some limits on the manufacture, ownership and sale of firearms or other weapons.

Requested by several states during the constitutional ratification debates, the amendment followed the efforts of the British to confiscate the colonists' firearms at the outbreak of the Revolutionary War. Patrick Henry had rhetorically asked if the States would be stronger "when we are totally disarmed, and when a British Guard shall be stationed in every house?"

==== Third Amendment ====
The Third Amendment prohibits the federal government from forcing individuals to provide lodging to soldiers in their homes during peacetime without their consent. Requested by several states during the Constitutional ratification debates, the amendment reflected the lingering resentment over the Quartering Acts passed by the British Parliament during the Revolutionary War, which had allowed British soldiers to take over private homes for their own use.

==== Fourth Amendment ====
The Fourth Amendment protects people against unreasonable searches and seizures of either self or property by government officials. A search can mean everything from a frisking by a police officer or to a demand for a blood test to a search of an individual's home or car. A seizure occurs when the government takes control of an individual or something in the possession of the individual. Items that are seized often are used as evidence when the individual is charged with a crime. It also imposes certain limitations on police investigating a crime and prevents the use of illegally obtained evidence at trial.

==== Fifth Amendment ====
The Fifth Amendment establishes the requirement that a trial for a major crime may commence only after an indictment has been handed down by a grand jury; protects individuals from double jeopardy; prohibits punishment without due process of law; and provides that an accused person may not be compelled to reveal to the police, prosecutor, judge, or jury any information that might incriminate or be used against themself in a court of law. Additionally, the Fifth Amendment also prohibits government from taking private property for public use without "just compensation", the basis of eminent domain in the United States.

==== Sixth Amendment ====
The Sixth Amendment provides several protections and rights to an individual accused of a crime. The accused has the right to a fair, speedy, and public trial by a local and impartial jury. This right also protects defendants from secret proceedings that might encourage abuse of the justice system, enshrines a right to legal counsel if accused of a crime, guarantees that the accused may require witnesses to attend the trial and testify in the presence of the accused, and guarantees the accused a right to know the charges against them. In 1966, the Supreme Court ruled that, with the Fifth Amendment, this amendment requires what has become known as the Miranda warning.

==== Seventh Amendment ====
The Seventh Amendment extends the right to a jury trial to federal civil cases, and inhibits courts from overturning a jury's findings of fact. Although the Seventh Amendment itself says that it is limited to "suits at common law", meaning cases that triggered the right to a jury under English law, the amendment has been found to apply in lawsuits that are similar to the old common law cases. For example, the right to a jury trial applies to cases brought under federal statutes that prohibit race or gender discrimination in housing or employment. This amendment guarantees the right to a jury trial only in federal court, not in state court.

==== Eighth Amendment ====
The Eighth Amendment protects people from having bail or fines set at an amount so high that it would be impossible for all but the richest defendants to pay, and also protects people from being subjected to cruel and unusual punishment. Although this phrase originally was intended to outlaw certain gruesome methods of punishment, it has been broadened over the years to protect against punishments that are grossly disproportionate to or too harsh for the particular crime. This provision has also been used to challenge prison conditions such as extremely unsanitary cells, overcrowding, insufficient medical care and deliberate failure by officials to protect inmates from one another.

==== Ninth Amendment ====
The Ninth Amendment declares that individuals have other fundamental rights, in addition to those stated in the Constitution. During the Constitutional ratification debates, Anti-Federalists argued that a Bill of Rights should be added. The Federalists opposed it on grounds that a list would necessarily be incomplete but would be taken as explicit and exhaustive, thus enlarging the power of the federal government by implication. The Anti-Federalists persisted, and several state ratification conventions refused to ratify the Constitution without a more specific list of protections, so the First Congress added what became the Ninth Amendment as a compromise. Because the rights protected by the Ninth Amendment are not specified, they are referred to as "unenumerated". The Supreme Court has found that unenumerated rights include such important rights as the right to travel, the right to vote, the right to privacy, and the right to make important decisions about one's health care or body.

==== Tenth Amendment ====
The Tenth Amendment (1791) was included in the Bill of Rights to further define the balance of power between the federal government and the states. The amendment states that the federal government has only those powers specifically granted by the Constitution. These powers include the power to declare war, to collect taxes, to regulate interstate business activities and others that are listed in the articles or in subsequent constitutional amendments. Any power not listed is, says the Tenth Amendment, left to the states or the people. While there is no specific list of what these "reserved powers" may be, the Supreme Court has ruled that laws affecting family relations, commerce within a state's own borders, abortion, and local law enforcement activities, are among those specifically reserved to the states or the people.

=== Remaining amendments (1795–present) ===
==== Eleventh Amendment (1795) ====
The Eleventh Amendment specifically prohibits federal courts from hearing cases in which a state is sued by an individual from another state or another country, thus extending to the states sovereign immunity protection from certain types of legal liability. Article Three, Section 2, Clause 1 has been affected by this amendment, which also overturned the Supreme Court's decision in Chisholm v. Georgia (1793).

==== Twelfth Amendment (1804) ====
The Twelfth Amendment modifies the way the Electoral College chooses the president and vice president. It stipulates that each elector must cast a distinct vote for president and vice president, instead of two votes for president. It also suggests that the president and vice president should not be from the same state. Article II, Section 1, Clause 3 is superseded by this amendment, which also extends the eligibility requirements to become president to the vice president.

==== Reconstruction Amendments (1865–1870) ====
The Thirteenth Amendment (1865) abolished slavery and involuntary servitude, except as punishment for a crime, and authorized Congress to enforce abolition. Though millions of slaves had been declared free by the 1863 Emancipation Proclamation, their post-Civil War status was unclear, as was the status of other millions. Congress intended the Thirteenth Amendment to be a proclamation of freedom for all slaves throughout the nation and to take the question of emancipation away from politics. This amendment rendered inoperative or moot several of the original parts of the constitution.

The Fourteenth Amendment (1868) granted United States citizenship to former slaves and to all persons "subject to U.S. jurisdiction". It also contained three new limits on state power: a state shall not violate a citizen's privileges or immunities; shall not deprive any person of life, liberty, or property without due process of law; and must guarantee all persons equal protection of the laws. These limitations dramatically expanded the protections of the Constitution. This amendment, according to the Supreme Court's Doctrine of Incorporation, makes most provisions of the Bill of Rights applicable to state and local governments as well. It superseded the mode of apportionment of representatives delineated in Article 1, Section 2, Clause 3, and also overturned the Supreme Court's decision in Dred Scott v. Sandford (1857).

The Fifteenth Amendment (1870) prohibits the use of race, color, or previous condition of servitude in determining which citizens may vote. The last of three post Civil War Reconstruction Amendments, it sought to abolish one of the key vestiges of slavery and to advance the civil rights and liberties of former slaves.

==== Sixteenth Amendment (1913) ====
The Sixteenth Amendment removed existing Constitutional constraints that limited the power of Congress to lay and collect taxes on income. Specifically, the apportionment constraints delineated in Article 1, Section 9, Clause 4 have been removed by this amendment, which also overturned an 1895 Supreme Court decision, in Pollock v. Farmers' Loan & Trust Co., that declared an unapportioned federal income tax on rents, dividends, and interest unconstitutional. This amendment has become the basis for all subsequent federal income tax legislation and has greatly expanded the scope of federal taxing and spending in the years since.

==== Seventeenth Amendment (1913) ====
The Seventeenth Amendment modifies the way senators are elected. It stipulates that senators are to be elected by direct popular vote. The amendment supersedes Article 1, Section 3, Clauses 1 and 2, under which the two senators from each state were elected by the state legislature. It also allows state legislatures to permit their governors to make temporary appointments until a special election can be held.

==== Prohibition Amendments (1919–1933) ====
The Eighteenth Amendment (1919) prohibited the making, transporting, and selling of alcoholic beverages nationwide. It also authorized Congress to enact legislation enforcing this prohibition. Adopted at the urging of a national temperance movement, proponents believed that the use of alcohol was reckless and destructive and that prohibition would reduce crime and corruption, solve social problems, decrease the need for welfare and prisons, and improve the health of all Americans. During prohibition, it is estimated that alcohol consumption and alcohol related deaths declined dramatically. But prohibition had other, more negative consequences. The amendment drove the lucrative alcohol business underground, giving rise to a large and pervasive black market. In addition, prohibition encouraged disrespect for the law and strengthened organized crime. Prohibition came to an end in 1933, when this amendment was repealed.

The Twenty-first Amendment (1933) repealed the Eighteenth Amendment and returned the regulation of alcohol to the states. Each state sets its own rules for the sale and importation of alcohol, including the drinking age. Because a federal law provides federal funds to states that prohibit the sale of alcohol to minors under the age of twenty-one, all fifty states have set their drinking age there. Rules about how alcohol is sold vary greatly from state to state.

==== Nineteenth Amendment (1920) ====
The Nineteenth Amendment prohibits the government from denying women the right to vote on the same terms as men. Prior to the amendment's adoption, only a few states permitted women to vote and to hold office.

==== Twentieth Amendment (1933) ====
The Twentieth Amendment changes the date on which a new president, vice president and Congress take office, thus shortening the time between Election Day and the beginning of presidential, vice presidential and congressional terms. Originally, the Constitution provided that the annual meeting was to be on the first Monday in December unless otherwise provided by law. This meant that, when a new Congress was elected in November, it did not come into office until the following March, with a "lame duck" Congress convening in the interim. By moving the beginning of the president's new term from March 4 to January 20 (and in the case of Congress, to January 3), proponents hoped to put an end to lame duck sessions, while allowing for a speedier transition for the new administration and legislators.

==== Twenty-second Amendment (1951) ====
The Twenty-second Amendment limits an elected president to two terms in office, a total of eight years. However, under some circumstances it is possible for an individual to serve more than eight years. Although nothing in the original frame of government limited how many presidential terms one could serve, the nation's first president, George Washington, declined to run for a third term, suggesting that two terms of four years were enough for any president. This precedent remained an unwritten rule of the presidency until broken by Franklin D. Roosevelt, who was elected to a third term as president 1940 and in 1944 to a fourth.

==== Twenty-third Amendment (1961) ====
The Twenty-third Amendment extends the right to vote in presidential elections to citizens residing in the District of Columbia by granting the District electors in the Electoral College, as if it were a state. When first established as the nation's capital in 1800, the District of Columbia's five thousand residents had neither a local government, nor the right to vote in federal elections. By 1960 the population of the District had grown to over 760,000.

==== Twenty-fourth Amendment (1964) ====
The Twenty-fourth Amendment prohibits a poll tax for voting. Although passage of the Thirteenth, Fourteenth, and Fifteenth Amendments helped remove many of the discriminatory laws left over from slavery, they did not eliminate all forms of discrimination. Along with literacy tests and durational residency requirements, poll taxes were used to keep low-income (primarily African American) citizens from participating in elections. The Supreme Court has since struck down these discriminatory measures.

==== Twenty-fifth Amendment (1967) ====
The Twenty-fifth Amendment clarifies what happens upon the death, removal, or resignation of the president or vice president and how the presidency is temporarily filled if the president becomes disabled and cannot fulfill the responsibilities of the office. It supersedes the ambiguous succession rule established in Article II, Section 1, Clause 6. A concrete plan of succession has been needed on multiple occasions since 1789. However, for nearly 20% of U.S. history, there has been no vice president in office who could assume the presidency.

==== Twenty-sixth Amendment (1971) ====
The Twenty-sixth Amendment prohibits the government from denying the right of United States citizens, eighteen years of age or older, to vote on account of age. The drive to lower the voting age was driven in large part by the broader student activism movement protesting the Vietnam War. It gained strength following the Supreme Court's decision in Oregon v. Mitchell (1970).

==== Twenty-seventh Amendment (1992) ====
The Twenty-seventh Amendment (1992) prevents members of Congress from granting themselves pay raises during the current session. Rather, any raises that are adopted must take effect during the next session of Congress. Its proponents believed that Federal legislators would be more likely to be cautious about increasing congressional pay if they have no personal stake in the vote. Article One, Section 6, Clause 1 has been affected by this amendment, which remained pending for over two centuries as it contained no time limit for ratification.

=== Unratified amendments ===
Collectively, members of the House and Senate propose around 150 amendments during each two-year term of Congress. Most however, never get out of the Congressional committees in which they are proposed, and only a fraction of those approved in committee receive sufficient support to win Congressional approval and actually enter the constitutional ratification process.

Six amendments approved by Congress and proposed to the states for consideration have not been ratified by the required number of states to become part of the Constitution. Four of these are technically still pending, as Congress did not set a time limit for their ratification. The other two are no longer pending, as both had a time limit attached and in both cases the time period set for their ratification expired.

==== Pending ====
- The Congressional Apportionment Amendment (proposed 1789) would, if ratified, establish a formula for determining the appropriate size of the House of Representatives and the appropriate apportionment of representatives among the states following each constitutionally mandated decennial census.
- The Titles of Nobility Amendment (proposed 1810) would, if ratified, strip United States citizenship from any citizen who accepted a title of nobility from a foreign country.
- The Corwin Amendment (proposed 1861) would, if ratified, shield "domestic institutions" of the states (which in 1861 included slavery) from the constitutional amendment process and from abolition or interference by Congress.
- The Child Labor Amendment (proposed 1924) would, if ratified, specifically authorize Congress to limit, regulate and prohibit labor of persons less than eighteen years of age. The amendment was proposed in response to Supreme Court rulings in Hammer v. Dagenhart (1918) and Bailey v. Drexel Furniture Co. (1922) that found federal laws regulating and taxing goods produced by employees under the ages of 14 and 16 unconstitutional. A federal statute approved June 25, 1938, regulated the employment of those under 16 or 18 years of age in interstate commerce. The Supreme Court, by unanimous vote in United States v. Darby Lumber Co. (1941), found this law constitutional, effectively overturning Hammer v. Dagenhart. As a result, the movement pushing for the amendment concluded.

==== Expired ====
- The Equal Rights Amendment (proposed 1972) would have prohibited deprivation of equality of rights (discrimination) by the federal or state governments on account of sex. A seven-year ratification time limit was initially placed on the amendment, but as the deadline approached, Congress granted a three-year extension. Thirty-five states ratified the proposed amendment prior to the original deadline, three short of the number required for it to be implemented (five of them later voted to rescind their ratification).
- The District of Columbia Voting Rights Amendment (proposed 1978) would have granted the District of Columbia full representation in the United States Congress as if it were a state, repealed the Twenty-third Amendment, granted the District unconditional Electoral College voting rights, and allowed its participation in the process by which the Constitution is amended. A seven-year ratification time limit was placed on the amendment. Sixteen states ratified the amendment (twenty-two short of the number required for it to be implemented) prior to the deadline, thus it failed to be adopted.

== Judicial review ==
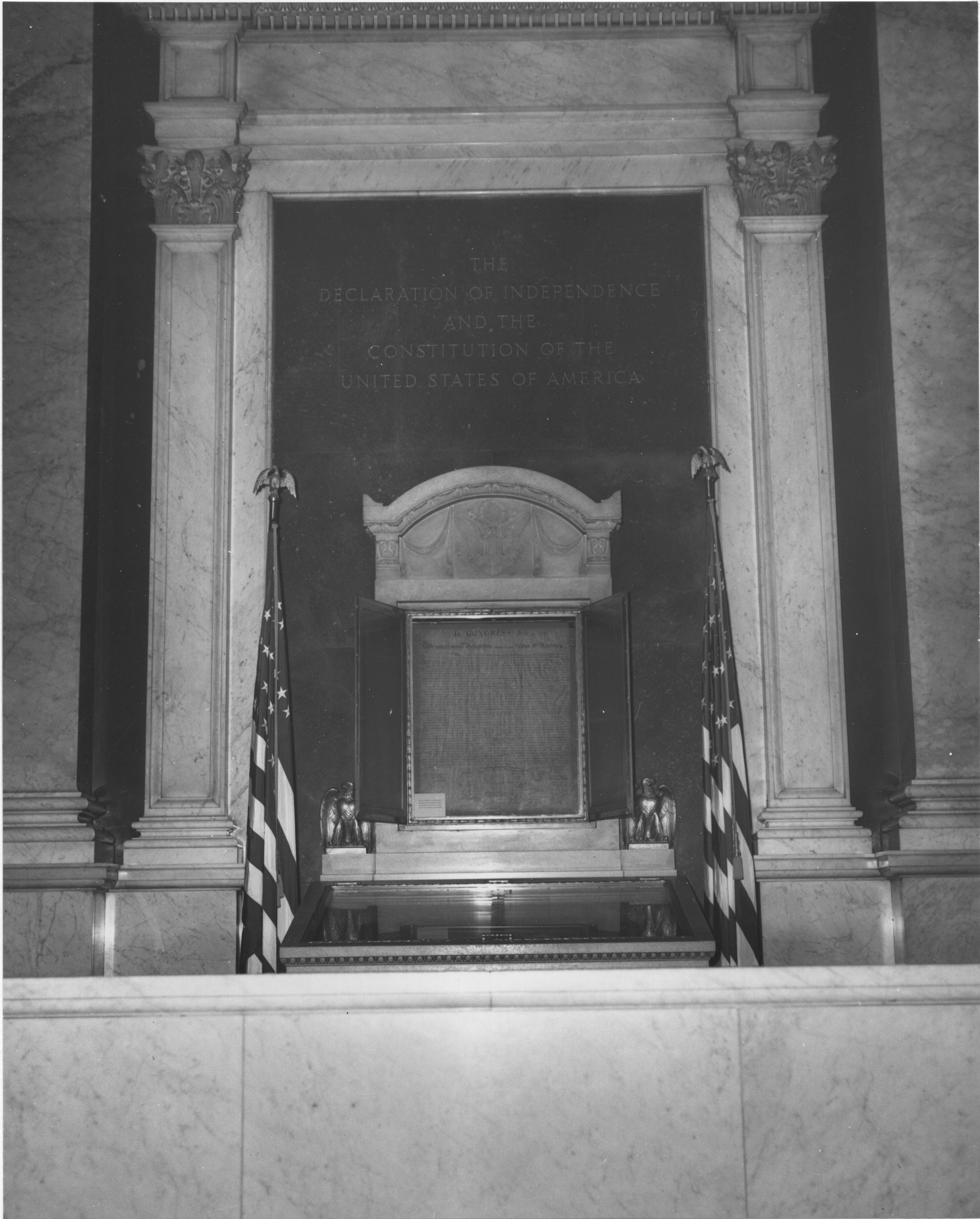
The Declaration of Independence and The Constitution on Display in the Library of Congress Prior to the Removal to the National Archives 13 December 1952

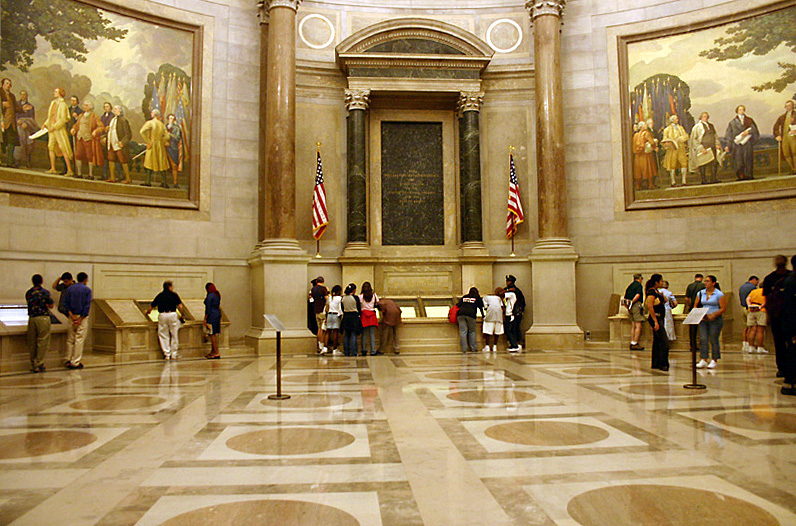
The National Archives' Rotunda for the Charters of Freedom in Washington, D.C. where, in-between two Barry Faulkner murals, the original Bill of Rights, Constitution, Declaration of Independence, and other American founding documents are publicly exhibited.

=== Scope and theory ===
Early Court roots in the founding

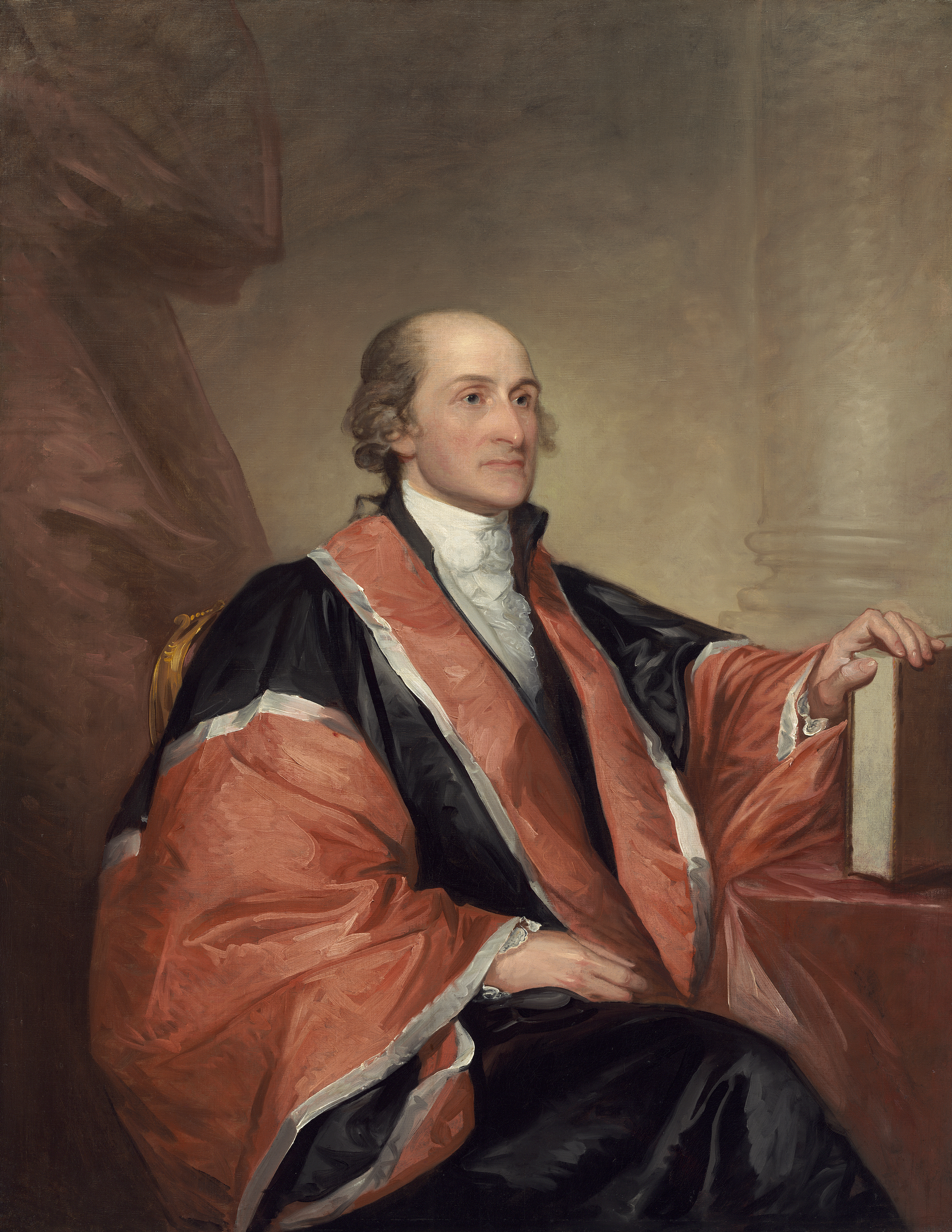
John Jay, 1789–1795, New York co-author The Federalist Papers

John Marshall, 1801–1835, Fauquier County delegate, Virginia Ratification Convention

Courts established by the Constitution can regulate government under the Constitution, the supreme law of the land. (Note: In this context, colonial territories held by the U.S. are not considered part of the land, so the constitution does not apply to them.) First, they have jurisdiction over actions by an officer of government and state law. Second, federal courts may rule on whether coordinate branches of national government conform to the Constitution. Until the twentieth century, the Supreme Court of the United States may have been the only high tribunal in the world to use a court for constitutional interpretation of fundamental law, others generally depending on their national legislature.

The basic theory of American judicial review is summarized by constitutional legal scholars and historians as follows: the written Constitution is fundamental law within the states. It can change only by extraordinary legislative process of national proposal, then state ratification. The powers of all departments are limited to enumerated grants found in the Constitution. Courts are expected (a) to enforce provisions of the Constitution as the supreme law of the land, and (b) to refuse to enforce anything in conflict with it. Judicial review relies on the jurisdictional authority in Article III, and the Supremacy Clause.

=== Case law ===
==== Barron v. Baltimore (1833) ====
When John Marshall followed Oliver Ellsworth as chief justice of the Supreme Court in 1801, the federal judiciary had been established by the Judiciary Act, but there were few cases. Review of state legislation and appeals from state supreme courts was understood. But the Court's jurisdiction over state legislation was limited. The Marshall Court's landmark Barron v. Baltimore held that the Bill of Rights restricted only the federal government, and not the states.

==== Marbury v. Madison (1803) ====
In the landmark Marbury v. Madison case, the Supreme Court asserted its authority of judicial review over Acts of Congress. Its findings were that Marbury and the others had a right to their commissions as judges in the District of Columbia. Marshall, writing the opinion for the majority, announced his discovered conflict between Section 13 of the Judiciary Act of 1789 and Article III. (Note: In this, John Marshall leaned on the argument of Hamilton in Federalist No. 78.) (Note: Although it may be that the true meaning of the Constitution to the people of the United States in 1788 can only be divined by a study of the state ratification conventions, the Supreme Court has used The Federalist Papers as a supplemental guide to the Constitution since their co-author, John Jay, was the first Chief Justice.) In this case, both the Constitution and the statutory law applied to the particulars at the same time. "The very essence of judicial duty" according to Marshall was to determine which of the two conflicting rules should govern. The Constitution enumerates powers of the judiciary to extend to cases arising "under the Constitution". Further, justices take a Constitutional oath to uphold it as "Supreme law of the land." Therefore, since the United States government as created by the Constitution is a limited government, the federal courts were required to choose the Constitution over congressional law if there were deemed to be a conflict. "This argument has been ratified by time and by practice ..." (Note: The entire quote reads, "This argument has been ratified by time and by practice, and there is little point in quibbling with it. Of course, the president also takes an oath to support the Constitution.") (Note: The presidential reference is to Andrew Jackson's disagreement with Marshall's Court over Worcester v. Georgia, finding Georgia could not impose its laws in Cherokee Territory. Jackson replied, "John Marshall has made his decision; now let him enforce it!", and the Trail of Tears proceeded. Jackson would not politically interpose the U.S. Army between Georgia and the Cherokee people as Eisenhower would do between Arkansas and the integrating students.)

==== Dred Scott (1857) ====
The Supreme Court did not declare another act of Congress unconstitutional until the controversial Dred Scott decision in 1857, held after the voided Missouri Compromise statute had already been repealed. In the eighty years following the Civil War to World War II, the Court voided congressional statutes in 77 cases, on average almost one a year.

Scope of judicial review expanded

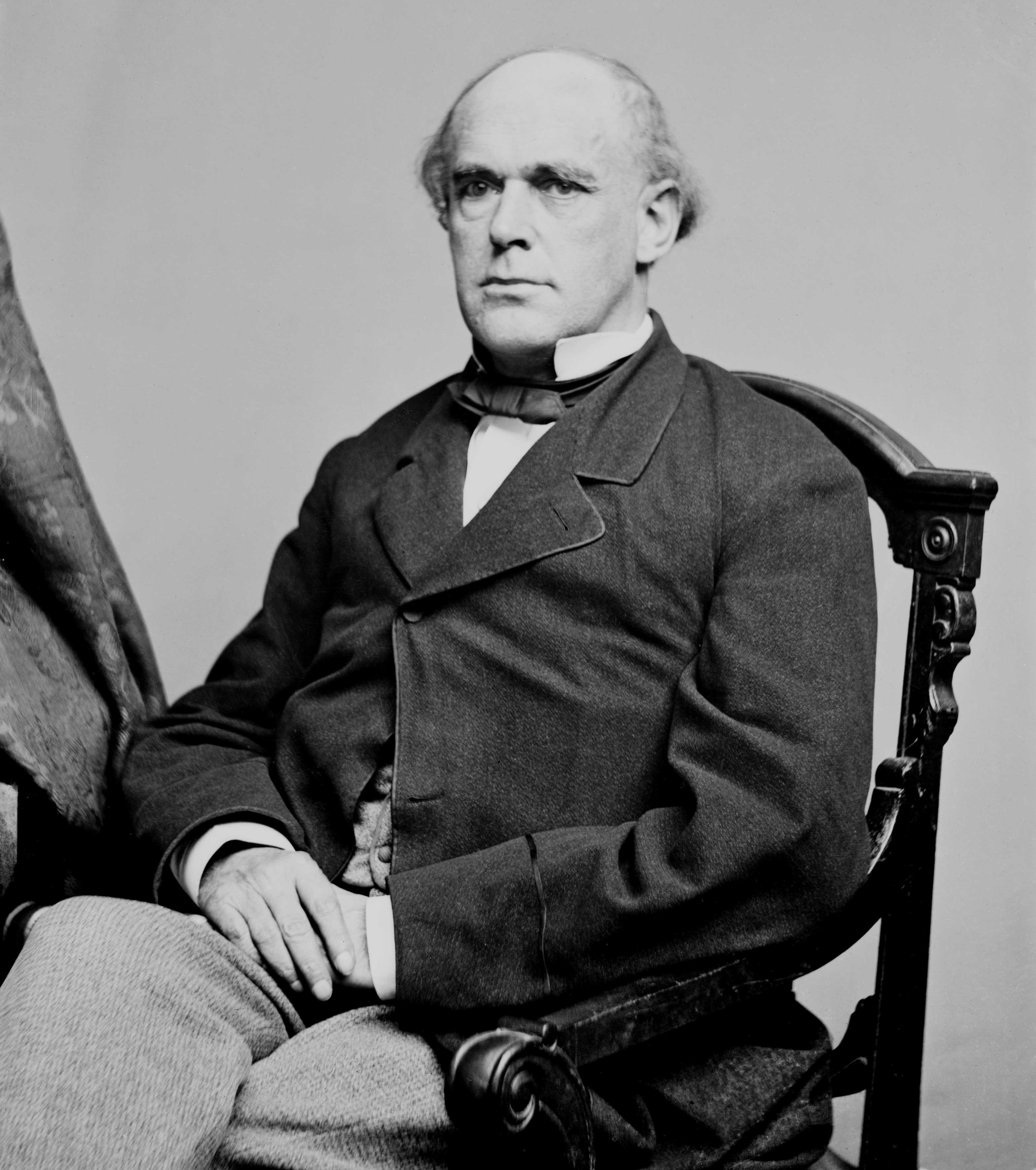
Salmon P. Chase (Note: The Chase Court, 1864–1873, in 1865 were Salmon P. Chase (chief Justice); Hon. Nathan Clifford, Maine; Stephen J. Field, Justice Supreme Court, U.S.; Hon. Samuel F. Miller, U.S. Supreme Court; Hon. Noah H. Swayne, Justice Supreme Court, U.S.; Judge Morrison R. Waite)
Union, Reconstruction

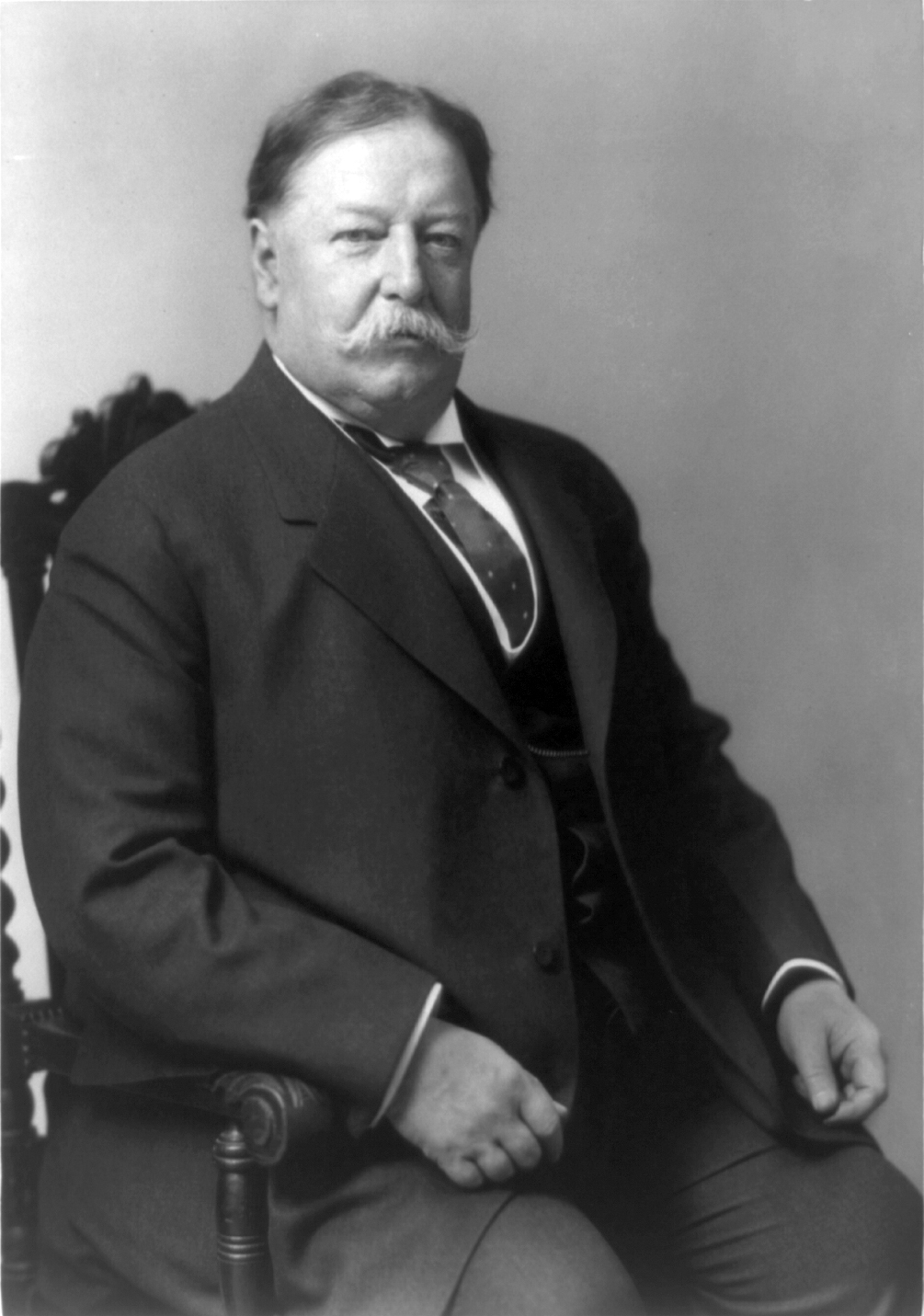
William Howard Taft (Note: The Taft Court, 1921–1930, in 1925 were James Clark McReynolds, Oliver Wendell Holmes Jr., William Howard Taft (chief justice), Willis Van Devanter, Louis Brandeis. Edward Sanford, George Sutherland, Pierce Butler, Harlan Fiske Stone)
commerce, incorporation

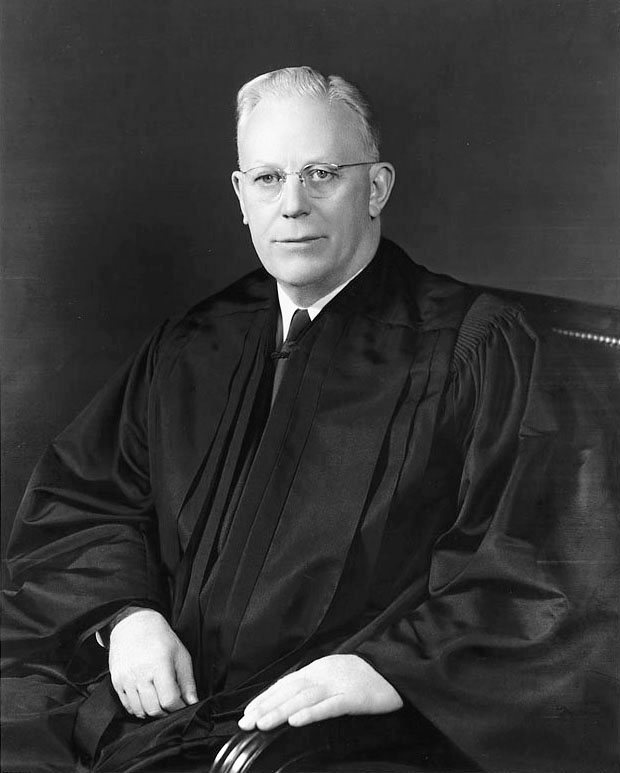
Earl Warren (Note: The Warren Court, 1953–1969, in 1963 were Felix Frankfurter; Hugo Black; Earl Warren (chief justice); Stanley Reed; William O. Douglas. Tom Clark; Robert H. Jackson; Harold Burton; Sherman Minton)
due process, civil rights

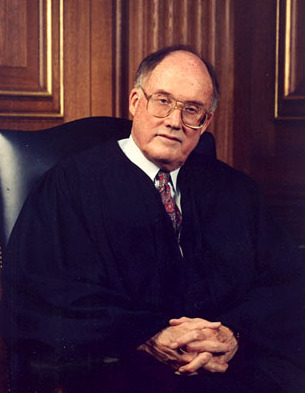
William Rehnquist (Note: The Rehnquist Court, 1986–2005.)
federalism, privacy

==== Chase Court (1864–1873) ====
Salmon P. Chase was a Lincoln appointee, serving as chief justice from 1864 to 1873. In one of his first official acts, Chase admitted John Rock, the first African American to practice before the Supreme Court. The Chase Court is famous for Texas v. White, which asserted a permanent Union of indestructible states. Veazie Bank v. Fenno upheld the Civil War tax on state banknotes. Hepburn v. Griswold found parts of the Legal Tender Acts unconstitutional, though it was reversed under a late Supreme Court majority.

==== Civil Rights Cases (1883) ====
The Civil Rights Cases, 109 U.S. 3 (1883), were a group of five landmark cases in which the Supreme Court of the United States held that the Thirteenth and Fourteenth Amendments did not empower Congress to outlaw racial discrimination by private individuals. The holding that the Thirteenth Amendment did not empower the federal government to punish racist acts done by private citizens would be overturned by the Supreme Court in the 1968 case Jones v. Alfred H. Mayer Co.The Fourteenth Amendment not applying to private entities, however, is still valid precedent to this day. Although the Fourteenth Amendment-related decision has never been overturned, in the 1964 case of Heart of Atlanta Motel, Inc. v. United States, the Supreme Court held that Congress could prohibit racial discrimination by private actors under the Commerce Clause.

==== Taft Court (1921–1930) ====
As chief justice, William Taft advocated for the Judiciary Act of 1925 that brought the Federal District Courts under the administrative jurisdiction of the Supreme Court. In 1925, the Taft Court issued a ruling overturning a Marshall Court ruling on the Bill of Rights. In Gitlow v. New York, the Court established the doctrine of "incorporation", which applied the Bill of Rights to the states. Important cases included the Board of Trade of City of Chicago v. Olsen, which upheld Congressional regulation of commerce; Olmstead v. United States, which allowed exclusion of evidence obtained without a warrant based on application of the 14th Amendment proscription against unreasonable searches; and Wisconsin v. Illinois, which ruled the equitable power of the United States can impose positive action on a state to prevent its inaction from damaging another state.

==== New Deal (1935–1936) ====
A crisis arose when, in 1935 and 1936, the Supreme Court handed down twelve decisions voiding acts of Congress relating to the New Deal. President Franklin D. Roosevelt then responded with his abortive "court packing plan". Other proposals have suggested a Court super-majority to overturn Congressional legislation, or a constitutional amendment to require that the justices retire at a specified age by law. To date, the Supreme Court's power of judicial review has persisted.

==== Warren Court (1953–1969) ====
Earl Warren was an Eisenhower nominee, chief justice from 1953 to 1969. In 1954, the Warren Court overturned a landmark Fuller Court ruling on the Fourteenth Amendment interpreting racial segregation as permissible in government and commerce providing "separate but equal" services. Warren built a coalition of justices after 1962 that developed the idea of natural rights as guaranteed in the Constitution. Brown v. Board of Education banned segregation in public schools. Baker v. Carr and Reynolds v. Sims established Court ordered "one-man-one-vote". Bill of Rights Amendments were incorporated into the states. Due process was expanded in Gideon v. Wainwright and Miranda v. Arizona. First Amendment rights were addressed in Griswold v. Connecticut concerning privacy, and Engel v. Vitale relative to free speech.

==== Burger Court (1969–1986) ====
Warren E Burger was appointed by Richard Nixon. Under his tenure, the Court decided the landmark cases of Roe v. Wade and Swann v. Charlotte-Mecklenburg Board of Education.

==== Rehnquist Court (1986–2005) ====
William Rehnquist was a Reagan-appointed chief justice, serving from 1986 to 2005. While he would concur with overthrowing a state supreme court's decision, as in Bush v. Gore, he built a coalition of Justices after 1994 that developed the idea of federalism as provided for in the Tenth Amendment. In the hands of the Supreme Court, the Constitution and its amendments were to restrain Congress, as in City of Boerne v. Flores. Nevertheless, the Rehnquist Court was noted in the contemporary "culture wars" for overturning state laws relating to privacy, prohibiting late-term abortions in Stenberg v. Carhart, prohibiting sodomy in Lawrence v. Texas, or ruling so as to protect free speech in Texas v. Johnson or affirmative action in Grutter v. Bollinger.

==== Roberts Court (2005–Present) ====
John Roberts was appointed Chief Justice in 2005.

=== Principles ===
==== Judicial restraint ====
The Supreme Court has developed a system of doctrine and practice that limits its own power of judicial review. The Court controls almost all of its business by choosing what cases to consider, limiting decisions by defining what is a "justiciable question". The Court requires a personal interest, not one generally held, and a legally protected right must be immediately threatened by government action. Cases are not taken up if the litigant has no standing to sue. The Court also generally refuses to make any advisory opinions in advance of actual cases. (Note: "Advisory opinions" are not the same as "declaratory judgments". (a) These address rights and legal relationships in cases of "actual controversy", and (b) the holding has the force and effect of a final judgment. (c) There is no coercive order, as the parties are assumed to follow the judgment, but a "declaratory judgment" is the basis of any subsequent ruling in case law.) Further, friendly suits between those of the same legal interest are not considered.

The procedural ways by which the Court dismisses cases have led critics to charge that the Supreme Court delays decisions by unduly insisting on technicalities in their "standards of litigability". They say cases are left unconsidered which are in the public interest, with genuine controversy, and resulting from good faith action.

==== Separation of powers ====
The Supreme Court balances several pressures to maintain its roles in national government. It seeks to be a co-equal branch of government, but its decrees must be enforceable. The Court seeks to minimize situations where it asserts itself superior to either president or Congress, but federal officers must be held accountable. The Supreme Court assumes power to declare acts of Congress as unconstitutional but it self-limits its passing on constitutional questions. But the Court's guidance on basic problems of life and governance in a democracy is most effective when American political life reinforces its rulings.

Justice Brandeis summarized four general guidelines that the Supreme Court uses to avoid constitutional decisions relating to Congress: (Note: Louis Brandeis concurring opinion, Ashwander v. Tennessee Valley Authority, 1936.) The Court will not anticipate a question of constitutional law nor decide open questions unless a case decision requires it. If it does, a rule of constitutional law is formulated only as the precise facts in the case require. The Court will choose statutes or general law for the basis of its decision if it can without constitutional grounds. If it does, the Court will choose a constitutional construction of an act of Congress, even if its constitutionality is seriously in doubt.

Likewise with the executive department, Edwin Corwin observed that the Court does sometimes rebuff presidential pretensions, but it more often tries to rationalize them. Against Congress, an act is merely "disallowed". In the executive case, exercising judicial review produces "some change in the external world" beyond the ordinary judicial sphere. The "political question" doctrine especially applies to questions which present a difficult enforcement issue. Chief Justice Charles Evans Hughes addressed the Court's limitation when political process allowed future policy change, but a judicial ruling would "attribute finality". Political questions lack "satisfactory criteria for a judicial determination."

John Marshall recognized that the president holds "important political powers" which as executive privilege allows great discretion. This doctrine was applied in Court rulings on President Grant's duty to enforce the law during Reconstruction. It extends to the sphere of foreign affairs. Justice Robert Jackson explained, foreign affairs are inherently political, "wholly confided by our Constitution to the political departments of the government ... [and] not subject to judicial intrusion or inquiry".

Critics of the Court object in two principal ways to self-restraint in judicial review, deferring as it does as a matter of doctrine to acts of Congress and presidential actions. Its inaction is said to allow "a flood of legislative appropriations" which permanently create an imbalance between the states and federal government. It has also been argued that the Supreme Court's deference to Congress and the executive compromises American protection of civil rights, political minority groups and aliens.

== In anthropology and sociology ==
There is a viewpoint that some Americans have come to see the documents of the Constitution, along with the Declaration of Independence and the Bill of Rights, as being a cornerstone of a type of civil religion. Some commentators depict the multi-ethnic, multi-sectarian United States as held together by political orthodoxy, in contrast with a nation-state of people having more "natural" ties.

== Worldwide influence ==
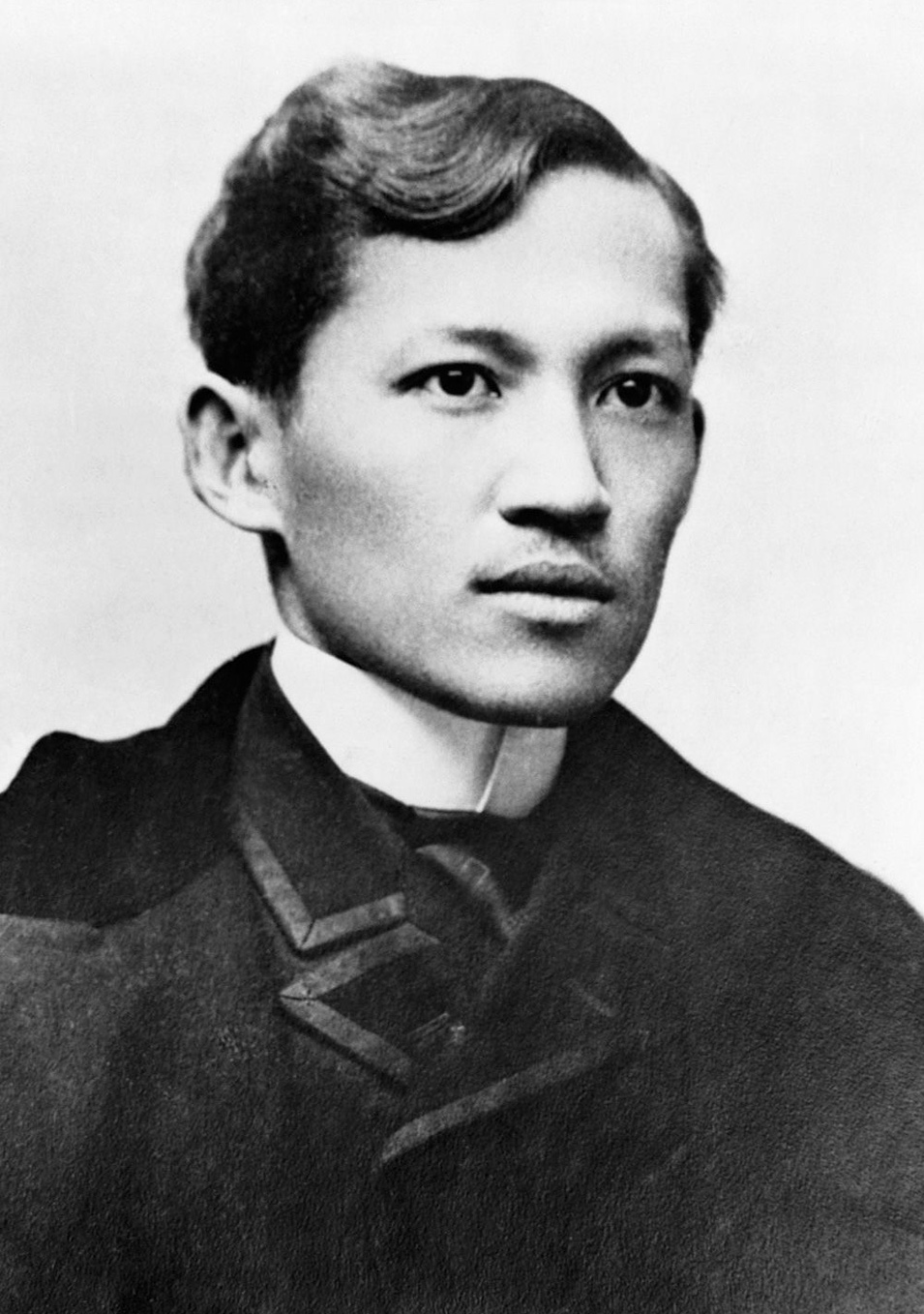
José Rizal

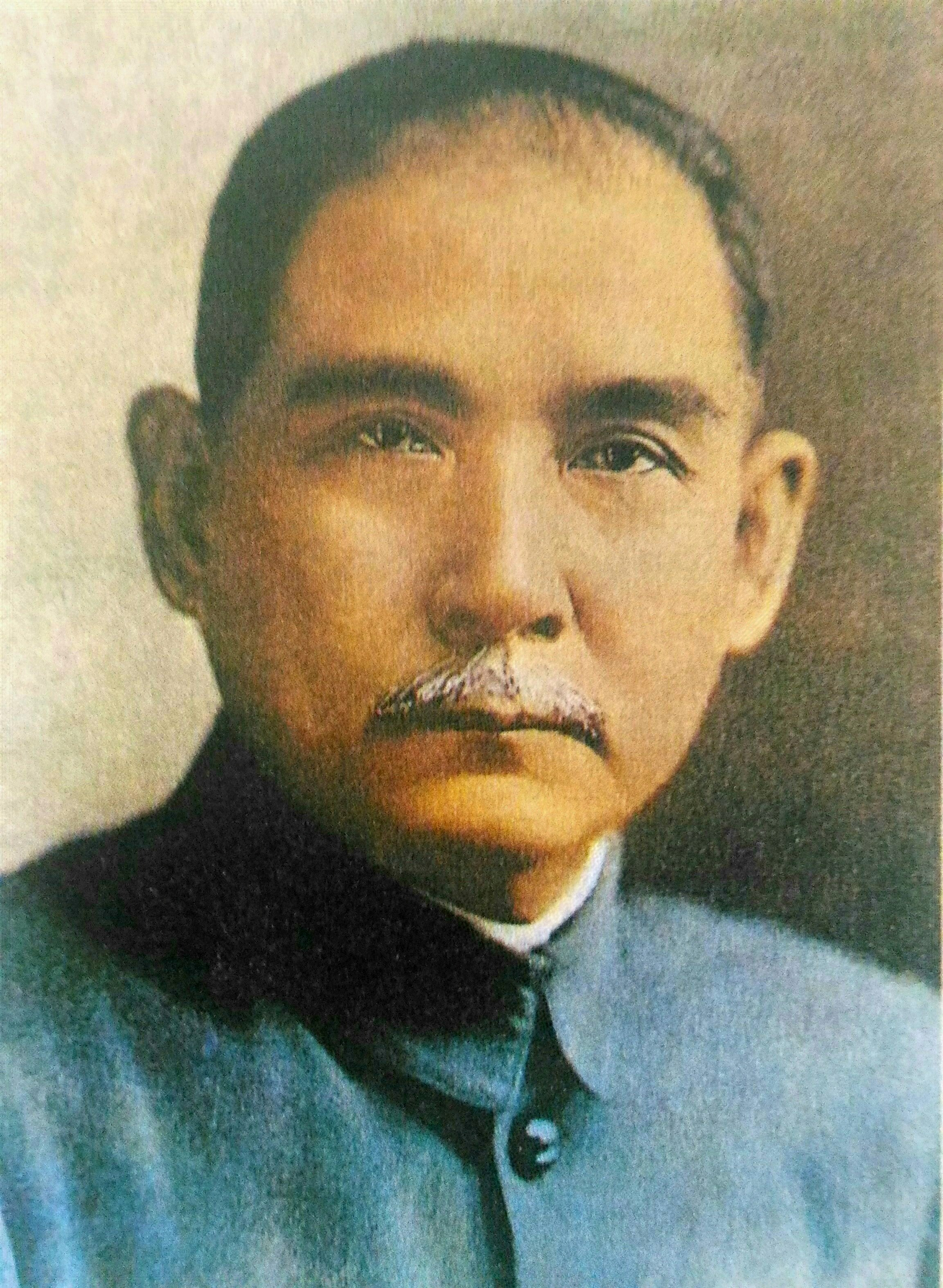
Sun Yat-sen

The United States Constitution has been a notable model for governance worldwide, especially through the 1970s. Its international influence is found in similarities in phrasing and borrowed passages in other constitutions, as well as in the principles of the rule of law, separation of powers, and recognition of individual rights.

The American experience of fundamental law with amendments and judicial review has motivated constitutionalists at times when they were considering the possibilities for their nation's future. It informed Abraham Lincoln during the American Civil War, (Note: "Secession was indeed unconstitutional ... military resistance to secession was not only constitutional but also morally justified. "the primary purpose of the Constitution was ... to create 'a more perfect union' ... the Constitution was an exercise in nation building.) his contemporary and ally Benito Juárez of Mexico, (Note: Juarez regarded the United States as a model of republican democracy and consistently supported Abraham Lincoln.) and the second generation of 19th-century constitutional nationalists, José Rizal of the Philippines (Note: The institutions of the two countries which have most influenced constitutional development are Spain and the United States". One of the reforms, "sine quibus non", to use the words of Rizal and Mabini, always insisted upon by the Filipinos, was Philippine representation in the Spanish Cortes, the promulgation in the Islands of the Spanish Constitution, and the complete assimilation equal to that of any in the Spanish provinces on the continent.) and Sun Yat-sen of China. (Note: In the modern history of China, there were many revolutionaries who tried to seek the truth from the West in order to overthrow the feudal system of the Qing dynasty. Sun Yat-sen, for example, was much influenced by American democracy, especially the U.S. Constitution.) The framers of the Australian constitution integrated federal ideas from the U.S. and other constitutions.

Since the 1980s, the influence of the United States Constitution has been waning as other countries have created new constitutions or updated older constitutions, a process which Sanford Levinson believes to be more difficult in the United States than in any other country.

== Criticism ==
The United States Constitution has faced various criticisms since its inception in 1787.

The Constitution did not originally define who was eligible to vote, allowing each state to determine who was eligible. In the early history of the U.S., most states allowed only white male adult property owners to vote; the notable exception was New Jersey, where women were able to vote on the same basis as men. Until the Reconstruction Amendments were adopted between 1865 and 1870, the five years immediately following the American Civil War, the Constitution did not abolish slavery, nor give citizenship and voting rights to former slaves. These amendments did not include a specific prohibition on discrimination in voting on the basis of sex; it took another amendment—the Nineteenth, ratified in 1920—for the Constitution to prohibit any United States citizen from being denied the right to vote on the basis of sex.

According to a 2012 study by David Law and Mila Versteeg published in the New York University Law Review, the U.S. Constitution guarantees relatively few rights compared to the constitutions of other countries and contains fewer than half (26 of 60) of the provisions listed in the average bill of rights. It is also one of the few in the world today that still features the right to keep and bear arms; the other two being the constitutions of Guatemala and Mexico.

Sanford Levinson wrote in 2006 that it has been the most difficult constitution in the world to amend since the fall of Yugoslavia. Levitsky and Ziblatt argue that the US Constitution is the most difficult in the world to amend, and that this helps explain why the US still has so many undemocratic institutions that most or all other democracies have reformed, directly allowing significant democratic backsliding in the United States.

== Commemorations ==
In 1937, the U.S. Post Office, at the prompting of President Franklin Delano Roosevelt, an avid stamp collector himself, released a commemorative postage stamp celebrating the 150th anniversary of the signing of the U.S. Constitution. The engraving on this issue is after an 1856 painting by Junius Brutus Stearns of Washington and shows delegates signing the Constitution at the 1787 Convention. The following year another commemorative stamp was issued celebrating the 150th anniversary of the ratification of the Constitution. In 1987 the U.S. Mint issued commemorative coins in celebration of the 200th anniversary of the signing of the Constitution.

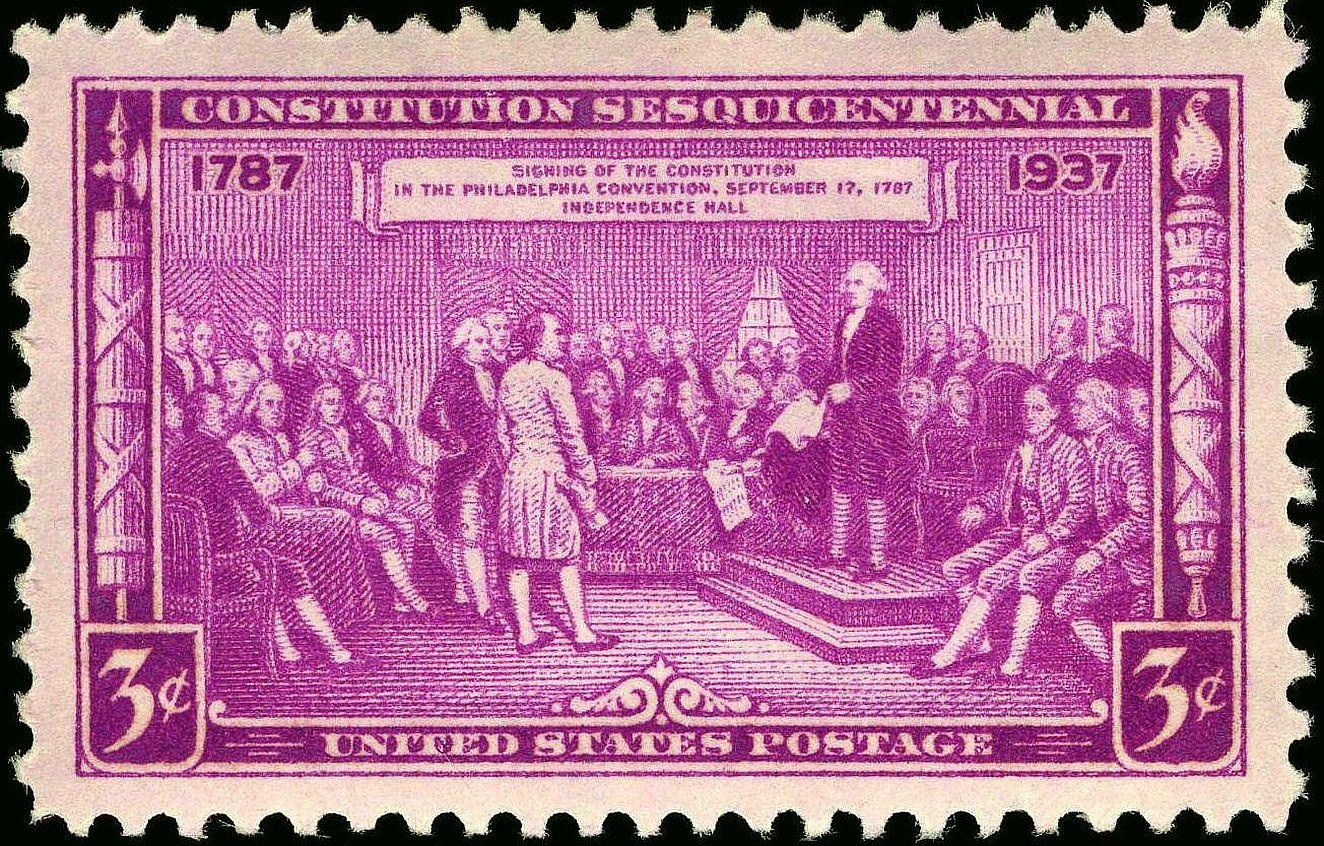
Postage Issue of 1937 commemorating the 150th anniversary of the signing of the Constitution

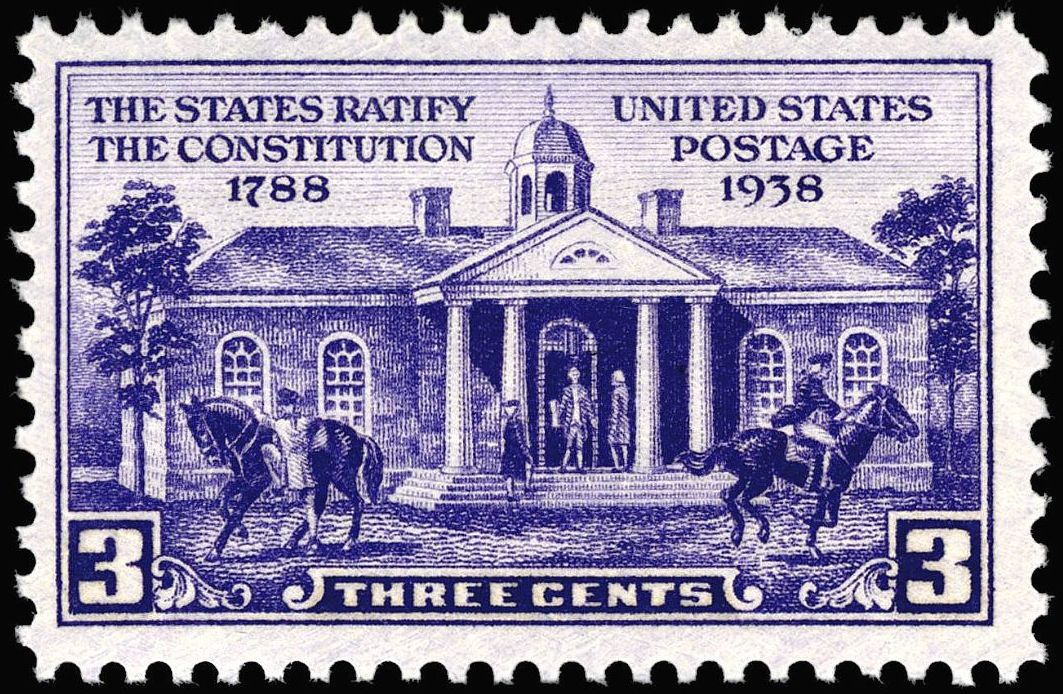
Postage Issue of 1938 commemorating the 150th anniversary of the ratification of the Constitution

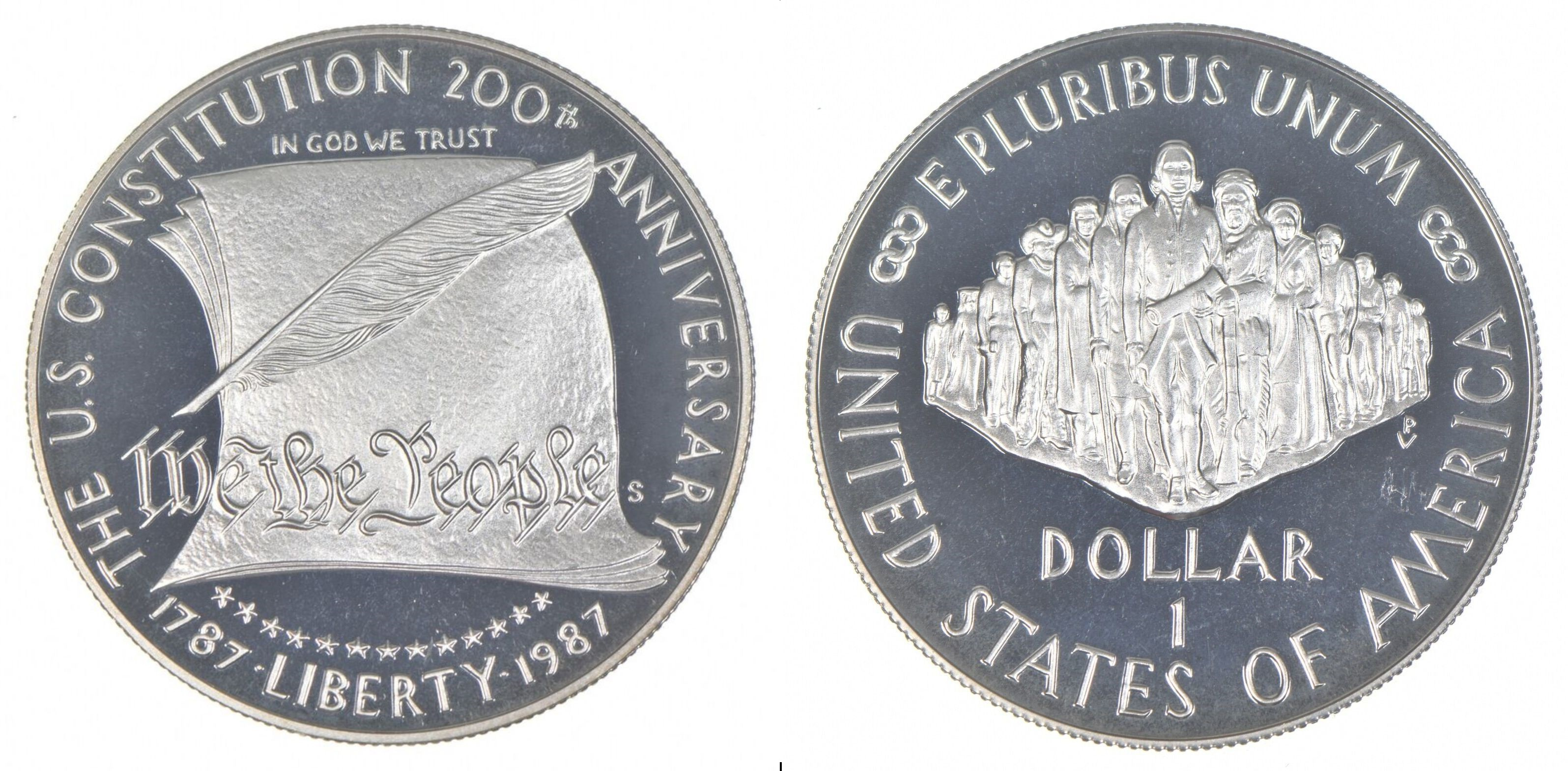
1987 Constitution Commemorative Silver Dollar

== See also ==
- Commentaries on the Constitution of the United States by Joseph Story (1833, three volumes)
- Congressional power of enforcement
- Constitution Day and Citizenship Day
- Constitution Week
- The Constitution of the United States of America: Analysis and Interpretation
- Constitution of 3 May 1791
- Constitutionalism in the United States
- Gödel's loophole
- Founding Fathers of the United States
- Founders Online
- History of democracy
- History of the United States Constitution
- List of national constitutions (world countries)
- List of proposed amendments to the United States Constitution
- List of sources of law in the United States
- Pocket Constitution
- Second Constitutional Convention of the United States
- Timeline of drafting and ratification of the United States Constitution
- UK constitutional law

=== Related documents ===
- Constitution of Massachusetts (1780)
- Fundamental Orders of Connecticut (1639)
- Massachusetts Body of Liberties (1641)
- Mayflower Compact (1620)
- Virginia Statute for Religious Freedom (1779)

== Bibliography ==
- Amar, Akhil Reed (2005). America's Constitution: A Biography. New York: Random House. ISBN 1-4000-6262-4.
- Beeman, Richard R. (2009). Plain, Honest Men: The Making of the American Constitution. New York: Random House. ISBN 978-1-4000-6570-7.
- Berkin, Carol (2002). A Brilliant Solution: Inventing the American Constitution. Orlando, FL: Harcourt. ISBN 0-15-100948-1.
- Bernstein, Richard B. (1987). Are We to Be a Nation? The Making of the Constitution. Cambridge, MA: Harvard University Press. ISBN 978-0-674-04475-3.
- Bickel, Alexander M. (1975). The Morality of Consent. New Haven, CT: Yale University Press. ISBN 0-300-01911-4.
- Billias, George (2009). American Constitutionalism Heard Round the World, 1776–1989: A Global Perspective. New York: New York University Press. ISBN 978-0-8147-9107-3.
- Bowen, Catherine Drinker (1966). Miracle at Philadelphia: The Story of the Constitutional Convention, May to September 1787. New York: Little, Brown. ISBN 978-0-316-10261-2.
- Callanan, Keegan (September 2014). "Liberal Constitutionalism and Political Particularism in Montesquieu's "The Spirit of the Laws"". Political Research Quarterly. 67 (3). Sage Publications, Inc.: 589–602. doi:10.1177/1065912914525862. JSTOR 24371894. S2CID 144988453.
- Campbell, Norine Dickson (1969). Patrick Henry: Patriot and Statesman. New York: Devin-Adair Co. ISBN 978-0-8159-6501-5.
- Ellis, Joseph J. (2000). Founding Brothers: The Revolutionary Generation. New York: Alfred A. Knopf. ISBN 978-0-375-40544-0.
- Farber, Daniel (2003). Lincoln's Constitution. Chicago: University of Chicago Press. ISBN 978-0-226-23793-0.
- Franklin, Benjamin (Spring 2010). "Constitutional Convention Speech". Litigation. 36 (3). American Bar Association: 64. JSTOR 29760791.
- Greene, Francis R. (Winter 1994). "Madison's View of Federalism in "The Federalist"". Publius. 24 (1). Oxford University Press: 47–61. JSTOR 3330704.
- Grinde, Donald A. Jr. (Spring 1995). "The Iroquois and the Development of American Government". Historical Reflections. 21 (2). Berghahn Books: 301–318. JSTOR 41299029.
- Howe, Daniel Walker (July 1989). "Why the Scottish Enlightenment Was Useful to the Framers of the American Constitution". Comparative Studies in Society and History. 31 (3). Cambridge University Press: 572–587. doi:10.1017/S0010417500016042. JSTOR 178771. S2CID 143686208.
- Johansen, Bruce E.; Grinde, Jr., Donald A. (January 1, 2003). "Reaching the Grassroots: The Worldwide Diffusion of Iroquois Democratic Traditions". American Indian Culture and Research Journal. 27 (2): 77–91. doi:10.17953/aicr.27.2.e162876764654688 (inactive August 17, 2025). ISSN 0161-6463.
- Jensen, Merrill (1950). The New Nation: A History of the United States During the Confederation, 1781-1789. New York: Alfred A. Knopf, Inc.
- Jillson, Calvin C. (2016) [2009]. American Government: Political Development and Institutional Change (8th ed.). New York: Routledge. ISBN 978-1-317-66679-0.
- Jefferson, Thomas (August 6, 1787). "References to Indian laws". Letter to John Rutledge. National Archives.
- Laslett, Peter (1960). Jon Locke Two Treatises of Government. Cambridge: The Cambridge University Press.
- Levinson, Sanford (1987). "Pledging Faith in the Civil Religion; Or, Would You Sign the Constitution?". William & Mary Law Review. 29 (113).
- Levy, Philip A. (1996). "Exemplars of Taking Liberties: The Iroquois Influence Thesis and the Problem of Evidence". The William and Mary Quarterly. 53 (3): 588–604. doi:10.2307/2947206. ISSN 0043-5597. JSTOR 2947206. S2CID 146842153.
- Lutz, Donald S. (1988). The origins of American constitutionalism. Baton Rouge: Louisiana State University Press. ISBN 0-807114790.
- Mack, Eric (2009). John Locke. New York: Continuum. ISBN 978-1-6235-6851-1.
- Maier, Pauline (2010). Ratification: The People Debate the Constitution, 1787–1788. New York: Simon & Schuster. ISBN 978-0-684-86854-7.
- Malcolm, George A. (1920). "Constitutional History of the Philippines". American Bar Association Journal. 6.
- Manning, John F. (June 2011). "Separation of Powers as Ordinary Interpretation". Harvard Law Review. 124 (8). The Harvard Law Review Association: 1939–2040. JSTOR 41306771.
- McLaughlin, Andrew C. (1935). A Constitutional History of the United States. New York: Appleton-Century-Crofts.
- Miller, Robert J. (March 2015). "American Indian Constitutions and Their Influence on the United States Constitution". Proceedings of the American Philosophical Society. 159 (1): 32–56. JSTOR 24640169.
- Moncure, Thomas M. Jr. (1990). "Who is the Militia: The Virginia Ratification Convention and the Right to Bear Arms" (PDF). Lincoln Law Review. 19: 1–25.
- Montesquieu, Charles Louis de Secondat, Baron de La Brède et de (1955) [1748]. Jean Jacques Rousseau (ed.). The Spirit of Laws: On the Origin of inequality; On Political Economy: The Social Contract. Vol. XXXVIII. Chicago: Encyclopedia Britannica.
- Morton, Joseph (2006). Shapers of the Great Debate at the Constitutional Convention of 1787: A Biographical Dictionary. Westport, CT: Greenwood Press. ISBN 978-0-313-33021-6.
- O'Connor, Tom (2010). "Constitutional Structure". Archived from the original on February 24, 2021.
- Payne, Samuel B. (1996). "The Iroquois League, the Articles of Confederation, and the Constitution". The William and Mary Quarterly. 53 (3): 605–620. doi:10.2307/2947207. ISSN 0043-5597. JSTOR 2947207.
- Pritchett, C. Herman (1959). The American Constitution. New York: McGraw-Hill.
- Qing Yu, Li (1988). "Dr. Sun Yat Sen and the U.S. Constitution". In Starr, Joseph Barton (ed.). The United States Constitution: Its Birth, Growth, and Influence in Asia. Hong Kong: Hong Kong University Press. ISBN 978-962-209-201-3.
- Rakove, Jack N. (1996). Original Meanings: Politics and Ideas in the Making of the Constitution. New York: Alfred A. Knopf. ISBN 0-394-57858-9.
- Randall, Richard S. (2003). American constitutional development. New York: Longman. ISBN 978-0-8013-2019-4.
- Reck, Andrew J. (June 1991). "The Enlightenment in American Law II: The Constitution". The Review of Metaphysics. 44 (4). Philosophy Education Society Inc.: 729–754. JSTOR 20129097.
- Stacy, Lee, ed. (2003). Mexico and the United States. Vol. 2. London: Marshall Cavendish. ISBN 978-0-7614-7402-9.
- Starna, William A.; Hamell, George R. (1996). "History and the Burden of Proof: The Case of Iroquois Influence on the U.S. Constitution". New York History. 77 (4): 427–452. ISSN 0146-437X. JSTOR 23182553.
- Stubben, Jerry D. (September 2003). "The Indigenous Influence Theory of American Democracy". Social Science Quarterly. 81 (3). University of Texas Press: 716–731. JSTOR 42863999.
- Tooker, Elisabeth (August 1988). "The United States Constitution and the Iroquois League". Ethnohistory. 35 (4). Duke University Press: 305–336. doi:10.2307/482139. JSTOR 482139.
- Warren, Charles (1928). The Making of the Constitution. Boston: Little, Brown, and Company.
- Werner, John M. (July–September 1972). "David Hume and America". Journal of the History of Ideas. 33 (3). University of Pennsylvania Press: 439–456. doi:10.2307/2709045. JSTOR 2709045.
- Wood, Gordon S. (1969). The Creation of the American Republic, 1776–1787. Chapel Hill: University of North Carolina Press. ISBN 978-0-807-84723-7.
- Zeydel, Walter H. (October 1966). "Sir William Blackstone and His Commentaries". The Quarterly Journal of the Library of Congress. 23 (4). Library of Congress: 302–312. JSTOR 29781237.
- Zink, James R. (2009). "The Language of Liberty and Law: James Wilson on America's Written Constitution". The American Political Science Review. 103 (3): 442–445. doi:10.1017/S0003055409990086. JSTOR 27798515. S2CID 145568103.
- "Magna Carta: Muse and Mentor; Magna Carta and the U.S. Constitution". Library of Congress. November 6, 2014.
- "Constitution Sesquicentennial Issue". Smithsonian National Postal Museum.
- "Constitution Ratification Issue". Smithsonian National Postal Museum.
