= Donald A. Grinde Jr. =

American professor and writer

Donald Andrew Grinde Jr., a professor at the University at Buffalo, is noted for his scholarship and writing on Native American issues.

Grinde was born in Savannah, Georgia, and has Yamasee heritage. He received his B.A. from Georgia Southern College (1966), and received his M.A. (1968) and Ph.D. (1974) from the University of Delaware. He taught at Mercyhurst College, Buffalo State College, UCLA, the University of Utah, University of California, Riverside, California Polytechnic State University, San Luis Obispo, and the University of Vermont before moving to Buffalo in 2004 as chair of its American Studies Department, now part of the Transnational Studies Department for which he is now director of graduate studies. He has published widely on Native American topics, with a particular emphasis on study of the Iroquois Confederation (Haudenosaunee). Grinde and Bruce E. Johansen became known for their works showing a connection from the Great Law of Peace of the Iroquois to the drafting of the United States Constitution.

He served as a thesis adviser for Mohamed Abdullahi Mohamed, current Prime Minister of Somalia.

== Publications ==
- Exemplar of Liberty: Native America and the Evolution of Democracy (Tokyo: Misuzu Shobo, 2006ISBN 978-4-62207-186-0) translation, originally published in 1991ISBN 978-0-93562-635-3
- A Political History of Native Americans (CQ Press, 2002) ISBN 978-1-56802-683-1, recognized as "Outstanding Academic Title" in 2003 by Choice Magazine
- with Bruce E. Johansen & Barbara Alice Mann, foreword by Vine Deloria Jr., Debating Democracy: Native American Legacy of Freedom (Santa Fe: Clearlight Publishers, 1997) ISBN 978-0-94066-679-5
- with Bruce Johansen, The Encyclopedia Of Native American Biography: Six Hundred Life Stories of Important People, From Powhatan to Wilma Mankiller

paperback: (Da Capo Press, 1998) ISBN 978-0-30680-870-8
hardcover: (Henry Holt & Co., 1997) ISBN 978-0-80503-270-3

- with translations by Robert Griffin, Apocalypse de Chiokoyhikoy, Chef des Iroquois..., in French (Quebec City: Laval University Press, 1997) ISBN 978-2-76377-449-7
- with Bruce Johansen, foreword by Howard Zinn, Ecocide of Native America: Environmental Destruction of Indian Lands and Peoples (Santa Fe: Clear Light Publishing, 1995) ISBN 0-94066-652-9
- with Duane Champagne, foreword by Dennis Banks, Native America: Portrait of the Peoples (Visible Ink Press, 1994)
- with Carole Gentry, The Unheard Voices: American Indian Responses to the Columbian Quincentenary (UCLA American Indian Studies Center, 1994) ISBN 978-0-935626-39-1
- with Oren Lyons, John Mohawk, et al., foreword by Peter Matthiessen, Exiled in the Land of the Free: Democracy, the Iroquois Nation and the U.S. Constitution (Santa Fe: Clearlight Publishers, 1992) ISBN 0-94066-650-2
- with Bruce Johansen, foreword by Vine Deloria Jr., Exemplar of Liberty: Native America and the Evolution of American Democracy (UCLA American Indian Studies, 1991) in print and internet
- The Iroquois and the Founding of the American Nation (San Francisco: Indian Historian Press, 1977) ISBN 978-0-91343-629-5
