= Bruce E. Johansen =

American academic and author (born 1950)

- Born: January 30, 1950 (age 76); San Diego, California
- Education: BA, PhD University of Washington
- Known for: Writings on environmental issues and Native American history

Bruce Elliott Johansen (born January 30, 1950) is an American academic and author. He is the Frederick W. Kayser Professor of Communication at the University of Nebraska at Omaha and is the author or editor of many books and articles, notably on environmental and Native American issues.

== Life and career ==
Johansen was born in San Diego, California, where his father served as a United States Coast Guard officer. He received his B.A. degree from University of Washington in 1972 and his M.A. from University of Minnesota in 1975. From 1972 to 1976 he also worked as reporter for the Seattle Times. Johansen received his PhD from University of Washington in 1979. His doctoral dissertation, Franklin, Jefferson and American Indians: a study in the cross-cultural communication of ideas, formed the basis of his 1982 book Forgotten Founders: How the American Indian Helped Shape Democracy. In 1982 Johansen joined the faculty of University of Nebraska at Omaha where he is the Kayser Professor of Communication. In 2011, Johansen was awarded the Isaacson Professorship by the university.

Johansen was lifelong friends with Roberto Maestas (July 9, 1938 – September 22, 2010), founder of El Centro de la Raza, a Latino community rights organization in Seattle.

== Publications ==
Indigenous issues

- Wasi'chu: The Continuing Indian Wars (Monthly Review Press, 1979) with Roberto Maestas. ISBN 0-85345-507-4
- Forgotten Founders: How the American Indian Helped Shape Democracy (Harvard Common Press, 1982) ISBN 0-91678-290-5
- El Pueblo: The Gallegos Family's American Journey, 1503–1980 (Monthly Review Press, 1983) with Roberto Maestas. ISBN 0-85345-612-7
- Exemplar of Liberty: Native America and the Evolution of Democracy (UCLA American Indian Studies Center, 1991) with Donald A. Grinde, Jr., foreword by Vine Deloria, Jr..
- Life and Death in Mohawk Country (Fulcrum Publishing, 1993) with John Kahionhes Fadden. ISBN 1-55591-906-5
- So Far from Home: Manila's Santo Tomas Internment Camp, 1942–1945 (PBI Press, 1996) ISBN 1-57579-037-8
- Native American Political Systems and the Evolution of Democracy: An Annotated Bibliography (Greenwood Publishing, 1996) ISBN 978-0-313-30010-3, part of the Bibliographies and Indexes in American History series.
- Debating Democracy: The Iroquois Legacy of Freedom (Santa Fe: Clear Light Publishing, 1997) with Donald A. Grinde Jr. & Barbara Alice Mann. ISBN 978-0-94066-679-5
- The Encyclopedia Of Native American Biography: Six Hundred Life Stories of Important People, From Powhatan to Wilma Mankiller with Donald A. Grinde, Jr.. (hardcover: Henry Holt & Co., 1997, ISBN 978-0-80503-270-3; paperback: (Da Capo Press, 1998) ISBN 978-0-30680-870-8).
- The Encyclopedia of Native American Legal Tradition (Greenwood Publishing, 1998) ISBN 978-0-313-30167-4
- The Encyclopedia of Native American Economic History (Greenwood Publishing, 1999) ISBN 978-0-313-30623-5
- Native America and the Evolution of Democracy: A Supplementary Bibliography (Greenwood Publishing, 1999) ISBN 978-0-313-31010-2, part of the Bibliographies and Indexes in American History series.
- Shapers of the Great Debate on Native Americans--Land, Spirit, and Power: A Biographical Dictionary (Greenwood Publishing, 2000) ISBN 978-0-313-30941-0
- Encyclopedia of the Haudenosaunee (Iroquois Confederacy) (Greenwood Publishing, 2000) with Barbara Alice Mann. ISBN 978-0-313-30880-2
- Enduring Legacies: Native American Treaties and Contemporary Controversies (Praeger Publishing, 2004) ISBN 978-0-313-32104-7
- The Native Peoples of North America: A History, 2 volumes (Praeger Publishing, 2005) ISBN 978-0-275-98159-4
- The Native Peoples of North America: A History (Rutgers University Press, 2006) paperback: ISBN 978-0-8135-3899-0
- The Praeger Handbook on Contemporary Issues in Native America, 2 volumes (Praeger Publishing, 2007) ISBN 978-0-275-99138-8, part of the Native America: Yesterday and Today series
- Encyclopedia of American Indian History, 4 volumes (ABC-CLIO, 2007) with Barry M. Pritzker. ISBN 978-1-85109-817-0
- The Iroquois (Chelsea House, 2010) ISBN 978-1-60413-794-1, part of the 14 volume History and Culture of Native Americans series.
- Native Americans Today: A Biographical Dictionary (Greenwood Publishing, 2010) ISBN 978-0-313-35554-7
- Encyclopedia of the American Indian Movement (Greenwood Publishing, 2013) ISBN 978-1-4408-0317-8, part of the Movements of the American Mosaic series

Environmental issues

- Ecocide of Native America: Environmental Destruction of Indian Lands and Peoples (Santa Fe: Clear Light Publishing, 1995) with Donald A. Grinde Jr., foreword by Howard Zinn. ISBN 0-94066-652-9
- The Global Warming Desk Reference (Greenwood Publishing, 2001) ISBN 978-0-313-31679-1
- The Dirty Dozen: Toxic Chemicals and the Earth's Future (Praeger Publishing, 2003) ISBN 978-0-275-97702-3
- Indigenous Peoples and Environmental Issues: An Encyclopedia (Greenwood Publishing, 2003) ISBN 978-0-313-32398-0
- Global Warming in the 21st Century, 3 volumes (Praeger Publishing, 2006) ISBN 978-0-275-98585-1
- The Global Warming Combat Manual: Solutions for a Sustainable World (Praeger Publishing, 2008) ISBN 978-0-313-35286-7
- Global Warming 101 (Greenwood Publishing, 2008) ISBN 978-0-313-34690-3, part of the Science 101 series
- The Encyclopedia of Global Warming Science and Technology, 2 volumes (Greenwood Publishing, 2009) ISBN 978-0-313-37702-0

Other topics

- Silenced!: Academic Freedom, Scientific Inquiry, and the First Amendment under Siege in America (Praeger Publishing, 2007) ISBN 978-0-275-99686-4
