= Louisa d'Andelot Carpenter =

American aviator and sportsman

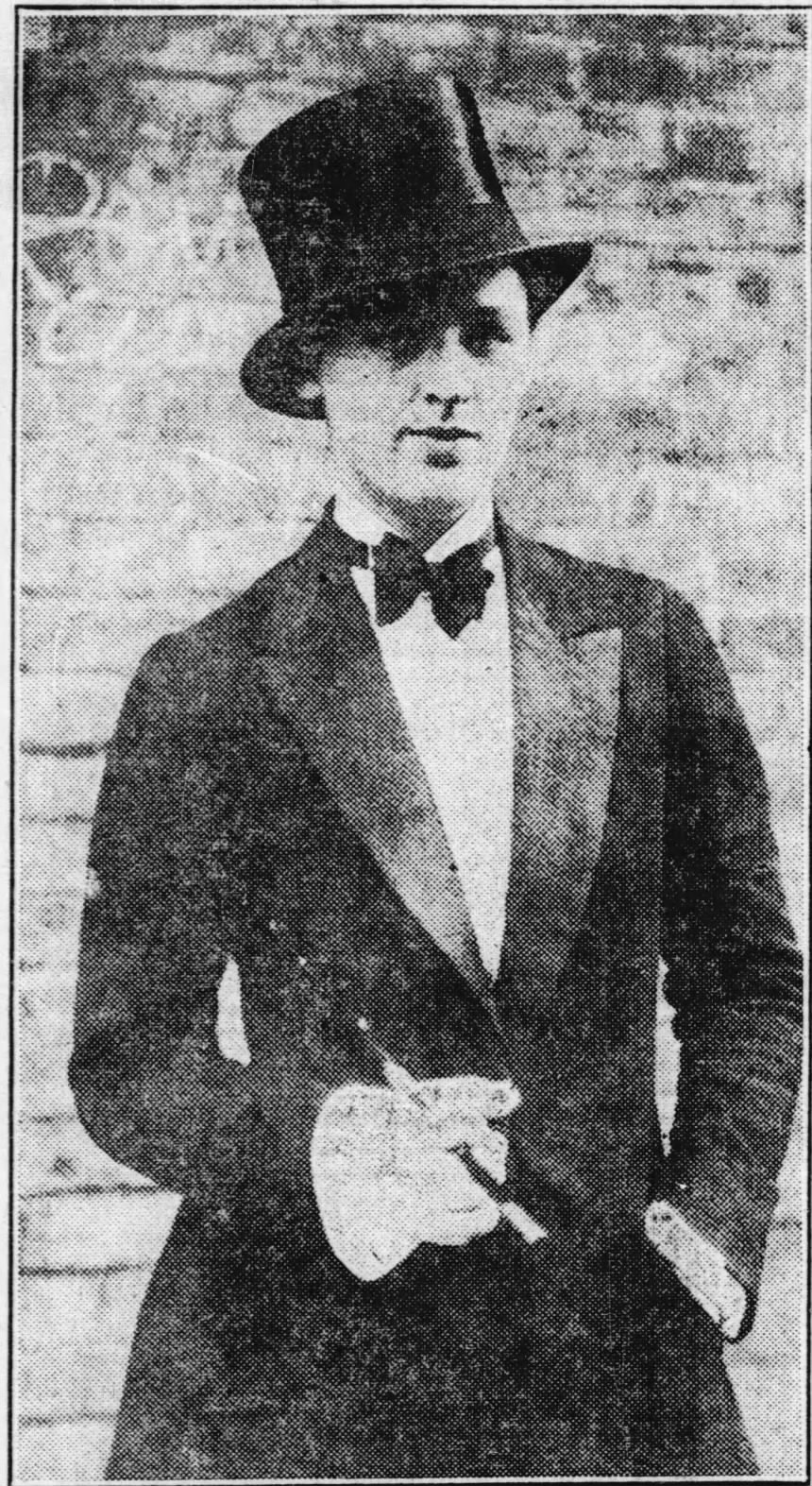
- Born: October 16, 1907
- Died: February 8, 1976 (aged 68); Easton, Maryland, US
- Burial place: Du Pont de Nemours Cemetery, Wilmington, Delaware
- Occupations: Horsewoman, aviator, socialite, philanthropist
- Family: du Pont family

Louisa d'Andelot Carpenter (October 16, 1907 – February 8, 1976) was a du Pont family heiress, noted horsewoman, early woman aviator, Jazz Age socialite, and philanthropist.

== Biography ==
Carpenter was born on October 16, 1907, to Robert Ruliph Morgan Carpenter and Margaretta Lammot du Pont. Her mother was the daughter of Lammot du Pont, grandson of the founder of E. I. du Pont de Nemours and Company. Her siblings were: Irene "Renee" du Pont Carpenter Draper, Nancy Gardiner Carpenter, Robert Ruliph Morgan Carpenter, Jr., and William Kemble Carpenter.

On July 20, 1929, Carpenter married John Lord King Jenney (1904-2005), a Princeton graduate and DuPont executive who retired from his 40-year career with the company in 1967. The couple divorced in 1935.

Carpenter enjoyed fox hunting as a Master of Fox Hounds, shooting pheasants, and riding and breeding horses. She was said to be the first American woman Master of Hounds. In the 1938 Official Roster of Organized Hunts in America, Carpenter is listed with her father, R. R. M. Carpenter, as Joint Master since 1928, of their private pack at Dilwyne Hunt in Montchanin. The Dilwyne Hunt livery and colors were Royal blue with black velvet color and breeches. Carpenter's adopted daughter Sonia (Sunny) Carpenter Tingle (1932-2019), also an accomplished horsewoman, was a whipper-in for the Dilwyne Hunt.

Carpenter commissioned the paintings of thoroughbred horses Jabneh (b. 1952) in 1956 and his dam Belle Soeur (b. 1945) in 1959 by equine artist Ann Collins. Jabneh, owned by Carpenter's partner in horsebreeding and training Eugenia Bankhead, was the 1957 winner of the Hialeah Turf Cup Handicap.

She was one of the first women airplane pilots.

In 1941, Carpenter was named manager of Delaware's only summer theatre, the Robin Hood Theatre in Arden, Delaware.

== Personal life ==
External images
- Photographs of Louisa Carpenter
- “Robin Hood theatre, Louisa Carpenter, new manager", July 17, 1941, via Delaware Public Archives

As an active sportswoman and socialite who hosted social and recreational gatherings at her many homes, Carpenter was mentioned frequently in café society and celebrity columns of the press in her lifetime. Her circle of friends, acquaintances and lovers included Evelyn Eugenia Bankhead and her younger sister Tallulah Bankhead, Jane Bowles, Paul Bowles, Louise Brooks, Marion Carstairs, Noël Coward, Greta Garbo, Libby Holman, Milly Monti, and Z. Smith Reynolds. Carpenter was regarded as a lesbian and often appeared in public in men's suits and ties.

In late 1929, Carpenter met Libby Holman, a Broadway actress and singer, who was to become an important person in her life, from lover to lifelong friend. Clifton Webb, co-starring with Holman in The Little Show, a popular musical review, introduced the two at an international horse show in Manhattan. Through 1929, the couple spent an increasing amount of time together in New York, cruising on The Galaxy (R. R. M. Carpenter's yacht), or at Carpenter's home in Delaware. Libby Holman married tobacco heir and young aviator Zachary Smith Reynolds in 1931, and only months later was indicted for his murder after a drunken house party in Winston-Salem, North Carolina. Carpenter sheltered Holman from the hounding press before the indictment was made, and paid Libby's $25,000 bail, appearing at the Wentworth, North Carolina, courthouse in such mannish clothes that bystanders and reporters thought she was a man.

The scandalous murder charge against Holman was dropped in late 1932 and she returned to live with Carpenter in Delaware, awaiting the birth of her child by Reynolds. Christopher Smith ("Topper") Reynolds was born to Holman on January 9, 1933, at Pennsylvania Hospital in Philadelphia. For the next several years, Holman and Carpenter spent time together at Rim Rock, a 10-acre estate in Watch Hill, Rhode Island, in New York and at Carpenter's home in Delaware. According to Holman biographer Jon Bradshaw, "Their relationship had ripened into what was known in the nineteenth century as a 'Boston marriage': that is, they were romantic friends ... " When Topper Reynolds was about 18 months old, Carpenter adopted "Sunny" from a Philadelphia orphanage and the children were raised as siblings. Holman was Sunny's godmother; Clifton Webb was her godfather.

Carpenter's obituary cited Eugenia Bankhead, the older sister of Tallulah Bankhead, as her partner in horse training and racing. Holman biographer Jon Bradshaw cited Eugenia's relationship with Carpenter as a "complicated love affair." Tallulah Bankhead and Eugenia Bankhead are both buried at St. Paul's Kent Churchyard, an historic Episcopal church in Kent County. When Tallulah died in December 1968, her sister Eugenia had her buried in Rock Hall, not far from where she had lived on Louisa Carpenter's estate since 1954. Tallulah Bankhead bequeathed a "pink shell brooch with gold and diamonds" to Carpenter in her will. Eugenia Bankhead died in 1979.

== Homes ==
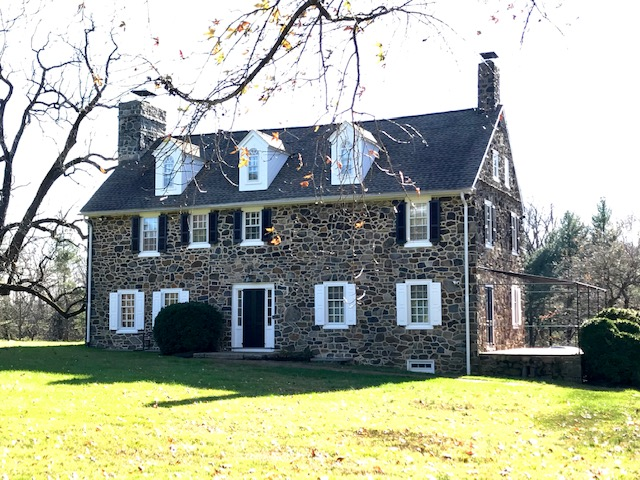
Strand Millas was given to Louisa Carpenter after her marriage in 1929

Carpenter lived in or was associated with many historic homes in her lifetime. Some of these were du Pont family homes and others were acquired directly by Carpenter.

After her marriage to John Jenney in 1929, Carpenters' parents gave her Strand Millas, an historic home with several outbuildings located near Montchanin and the center of Carpenter's horsing life. Built of quarried stone with a datestone of 1701, Strand Millas is from the era of William Penn's Quaker colony in Delaware and was added to the National Register of Historic Places in 1973.

In the late 1940s, Carpenter moved to Fairlee Manor, near Rock Hall, Maryland, where she had more room for horse breeding and training. This home, described as a "telescoping house" with its center structure flanked on each side by two balanced additions, was built between 1825 and 1840 on land traced back to a 1764 patent for James Brown. In 1953, Carpenter gave Fairlee Manor to the Easter Seal Society to be used as a summer camp for children and adults with disabilities. Fairlee Manor was listed in the National Register of Historic Places in 1973.

Before donating Fairlee Manor, in 1951 Carpenter bought and restored Springfield Farm, also located in Kent County (not to be confused with the historic Springfield Farm in Washington County). Benjamin Ricaud purchased the land at Springfield Farm in 1674 and his grandson, also named Benjamin Ricaud, built the extant brick and frame house on the property in 1770. Springfield Farm was surveyed for the Maryland Historic Sites Inventory in September 1977.

In 1920, Carpenter 's parents, Margaretta Lammot du Pont Carpenter and R. R. M. Carpenter, built Shell House, their summer home near Rehoboth Beach, Delaware, which became the site of many of Carpenter's legendary house parties. Carpenter Beach, as the ocean side of the house came be known, is said to be the birthplace of Rehoboth's vibrant gay scene. In August 2020, after being listed on the real estate market for over a year, the century-old Shell House was torn down.

== Death and legacy ==
Carpenter died when her private plane crashed near her Easton, Maryland, farm on February 8, 1976, at the age of 68. She was survived by three children: Sonia C. Tingle, Carla C. Matthews, and Ronald d'Andelot Carpenter, nine grandchildren, and her two brothers and sister Renee Draper. Carpenter was buried in the Du Pont de Nemours Cemetery in Wilmington, Delaware.

At her death, Carpenter was president of the Springfield Foundation, Inc., which she had founded in 1963 to address poor housing conditions for black residents in Chestertown, Maryland. Before Carpenter's death in 1976, the Springfield Foundation completed a 56-unit low-income housing development known as Washington Park.

In June 2017, the Chestertown Council approved renaming of Washington Park in honor of Carpenter. The dedication was recommended by the Washington Park Committee and the Chestertown Recreation Commission in recognition of Carpenter's community contributions. In addition to donating Camp Fairlee to the Easter Seal Society for Crippled Children and Adults of Delaware Inc., Carpenter donated land for the Washington Park development and arranged funding for low-income families to live there.
