= Inn at Montchanin Village =

Historic hotel in Delaware, U.S.

Coordinates: 39.7906°N 75.5887°W

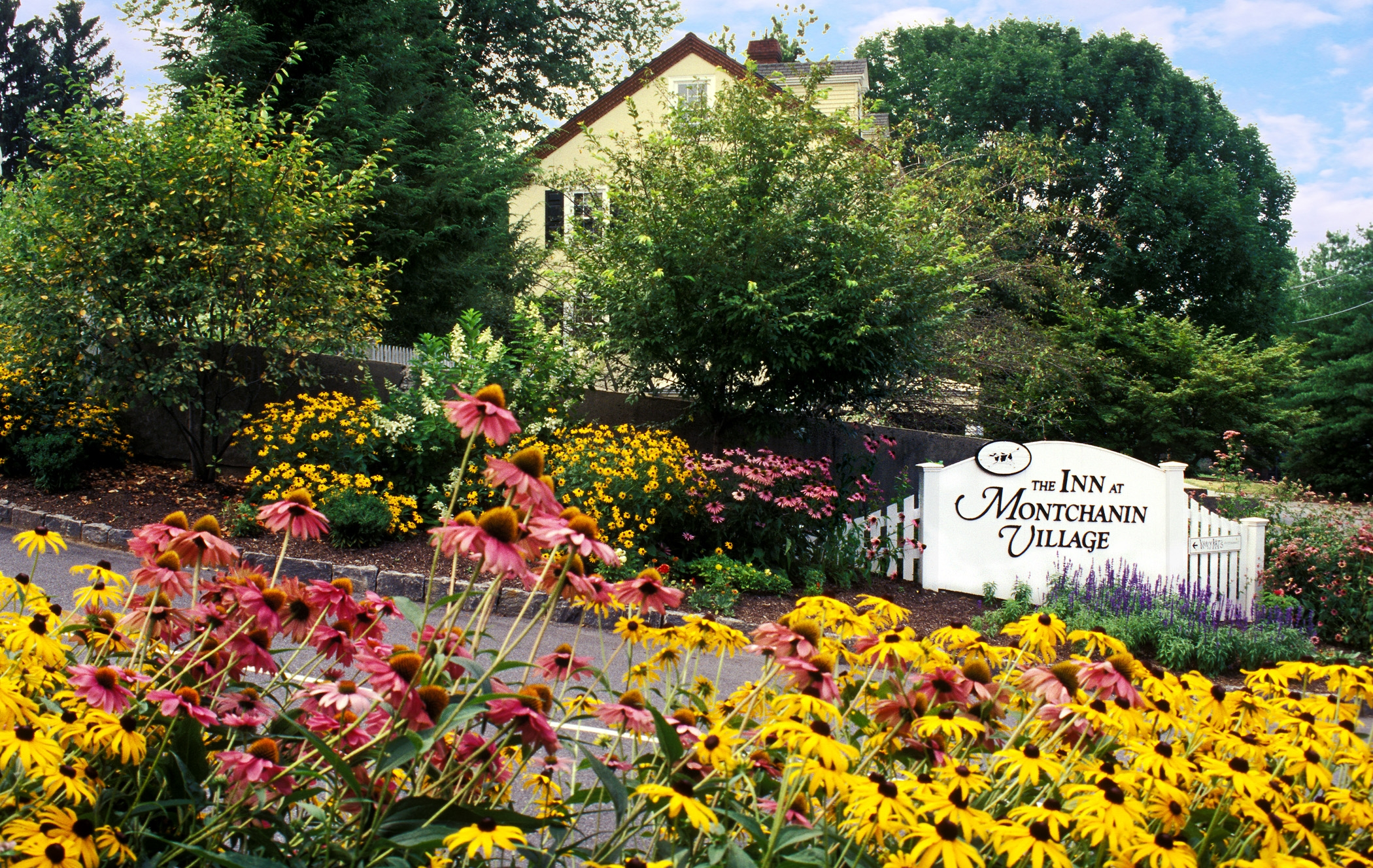
- Entrance in garden

General information
- Location: Montchanin Historic District, 528 Montchanin Road; Montchanin, Delaware 19710
- Affiliation: Historic Hotels of America

Other information
- Number of rooms: 28

Website
- www.montchanin.com

The Inn at Montchanin Village is a historic hotel in Montchanin, Delaware, an unincorporated community in New Castle County. The Inn, which consists of historic houses and other buildings, now interconnected by elaborate gardens, comprises much or all of the Montchanin Historic District, which is listed on the National Register of Historic Places.

== History ==
The modern history of the area can be traced back to the early 19th century and is connected to the DuPont family. Montchanin, which was named after Anne Alexandrine de Montchanin, the mother of Pierre Samuel du Pont de Nemours, patriarch of the DuPont family. The village housed workers in the nearby DuPont gunpowder mill, and the town train station became an important stop for shipping black powder to the coal fields in Pennsylvania.

The existing buildings were added to the National Register of Historic Places in 1978. In 1996 Missy Lickle (a seventh-generation member of the DuPont family) and her husband Daniel, bought the properties and renovated them, turning them into the Inn and Montchanin Village. Today, the eleven buildings on site house 28 rooms. The Inn is a member of the Historic Hotels of America.
