= Ruly Carpenter =

American baseball executive (1940–2021)

- Born: Robert Ruliph Morgan Carpenter III; June 10, 1940; Wilmington, Delaware, U.S.
- Died: September 13, 2021 (aged 81); Montchanin, Delaware, U.S.
- Spouse: Stephanie Conklin
- Children: 3
- Father: R. R. M. Carpenter Jr.
- Relatives: R. R. M. Carpenter (grandfather)

Robert Ruliph Morgan "Ruly" Carpenter III (June 10, 1940 – September 13, 2021) was an American businessman and baseball executive. He was the principal owner and president of the Philadelphia Phillies from 1972 to 1981.

== Early life ==
Carpenter was born in Wilmington, Delaware, on June 10, 1940. He was the first of three children of Bob Carpenter and Mary Kaye Phelps. He was three years old when his grandfather, R. R. M. Carpenter Sr., bought the Philadelphia Phillies in 1943 and appointed Bob as team president. His grandmother was Margaretta Lammot du Pont, the sister of company president Pierre S. du Pont. Carpenter attended Tower Hill School, where he was a first-team All-State end. He went on to study at Yale University, lettering in football and baseball there.

== Career ==
Carpenter joined his father in the Phillies' front office in 1963. Two years later, he suggested that his father hire Paul Owens, a young scout, as farm system director. Owens would eventually become general manager in 1972.

Carpenter became team president at age 32, when his father stepped down during the 1972 season while remaining chairman of the board. He became the youngest team president in MLB. His tenure as owner was, statistically speaking, one of the most successful in franchise history. From 1976 to 1980, the Phillies won the NL East in every season but one, including the team's first World Series win in 1980. They also won the first half National League East title in the strike-shortened 1981 season. Carpenter was opposed to female reporters being allowed into the team's locker rooms, but acquiesced to a court ruling in 1979 because he did not want to continue to fight what he regarded as a losing battle.

Soon after the World Series triumph, however, Carpenter decided to sell the team. With the advent of free agency, salaries were already starting to spiral upward, with the Phillies having the second-highest payroll in the MLB at the time. He believed that even with his considerable wealth he needed to take on minority investors in order to stay afloat. Unwilling to have to get permission from partners in order to make major decisions, he sold the Phillies to a group headed by longtime Phillies executive Bill Giles for $32.5 million in 1981—a handsome return on his grandfather's purchase of the team for $400,000 38 years earlier.

Carpenter resided in Wilmington. He was a longtime member of the University of Delaware Board of Trustees; his family has supported the school for many years. He remained an avid Phillies fan, and closely followed the team's run to its second World Series championship in 2008. He was inducted into the Delaware Sports Hall of Fame in 1987. He was inducted into the Philadelphia Phillies Wall of Fame on August 12, 2023.

== Personal life ==
Carpenter was married to Stephanie (Conklin) Carpenter for 61 years until his death. Together, they had three children: Robert IV, David, and Cinda.

Carpenter died on September 13, 2021, at his home in Montchanin, Delaware.

Preceded by Bob Carpenter	Philadelphia Phillies President; 1972–1981	Succeeded by Bill Giles
