= Ann Collins =

American painter (1916–1999)

Ann Collins Evans
- Born: Ann Collins; April 29, 1916; Lyons, New York
- Died: January 6, 1999 (aged 82); Lyons, New York
- Education: Lyons Central School, Syracuse University
- Known for: She was an artist of thoroughbred racehorses.
- Spouse: Laramie Evans

Ann Collins, also known as Ann Collins Evans (April 29, 1916 – January 6, 1999), was an American artist of thoroughbred racehorses.

== Personal life ==
Ann Collins was born in Lyons, New York. Her father went to Colorado for his health and worked for a timber operation as an overseer soon after she was born. She lived with her parents, Cornelius and Lisetta, and older sister, Ellen. She grew up in a remote area of Colorado where buffalo ran wild on the 25-mile tract of land. At four years of age, she was given a pony. She was breaking in colts and riding any horse on the tract by the time she was eight years old. She began drawing ponies as a young girl and at the age of 14 went to school at Mount St. Scholastica Academy, a Benedictine convent in Cañon City, Colorado. Her father's health improved, and the family returned to Lyons. In 1934, she graduated from Lyons Central School. She studied art at Syracuse University. Her professors encouraged her to pursue oil painting, and two years later, she had her first exhibit on the lawn of the Saratoga gambling casino, Piping Rock, which her father ran with Red Dywer. Col. E.R. Bradley, owner of four Kentucky Derby winners, bought one of her paintings there and launched her career.

She married Laramie Evans, with whom she had a daughter, Larry Ann Evans. She lived in many places during her life and returned to Lyons, New York, in 1975, where she died in 1999.

== Career ==
Collins began painting thoroughbred racehorses in the 1930s. In 1941, she won first prize for Bronco at the Finger Lakes exhibition in northern New York. She became interested in painting racing colts in Florida at Hialeah and at Oriental Park in Havana. Collins held an exhibition in 1941 at Saratoga, New York, and sold paintings to Al Sabath and Col. E. R. Bradley. She then painted Alsab, who won the Narragansett in the fall of 1942, for Sabath. To complete a painting, she researched the horse, visited its stable, and sketched the horse and any distinctive marks. Collins used vivid colors and illustrated the effects of the sun and wind in her works. It took about a month to complete her realistic paintings that captured the horses' personalities. In the early 1940s, she worked in her Lyons, New York, studio.

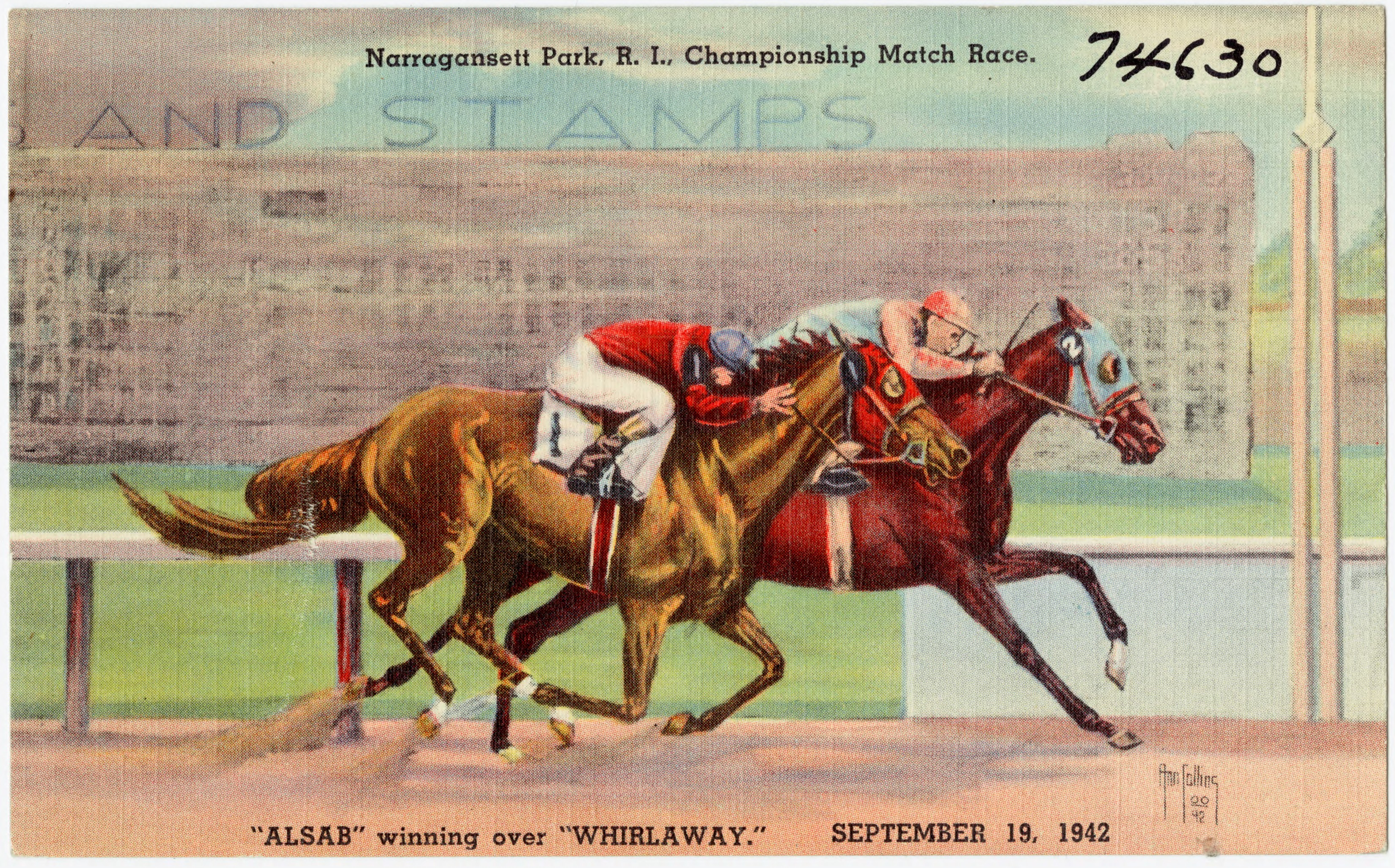
Alsab winning over Whirlaway at Narrangasett Park, Rhode Island, painted by Ann Collins, 1942

Collins was hired by trainers, breeders, and racehorse owners. The more than 75 racehorses that she painted through the 1980s include:

- Citation, commissioned by Nat Herzfeld, former President of Tropical Park Race Course
- Chrysler II and By Jimminy for Walter P. Chrysler
- Dom Bingo for Bing Crosby
- Tom Fool for Jock Whitney
- Discovery and Bed O' Roses for Alfred Gwynne Vanderbilt Jr.
- Rouge Dragon, which is in The National Museum of Racing collection in Saratoga Springs, New York.
- Quadrangle for Paul Mellon
- Alsab and Whirlaway in a famous match race, commissioned by Narangasett Park
- Jabneh and Belle Soueur for Louisa Carpenter
