= Strand Millas and Rock Spring =

Historic house in Delaware, US

- U.S. National Register of Historic Places
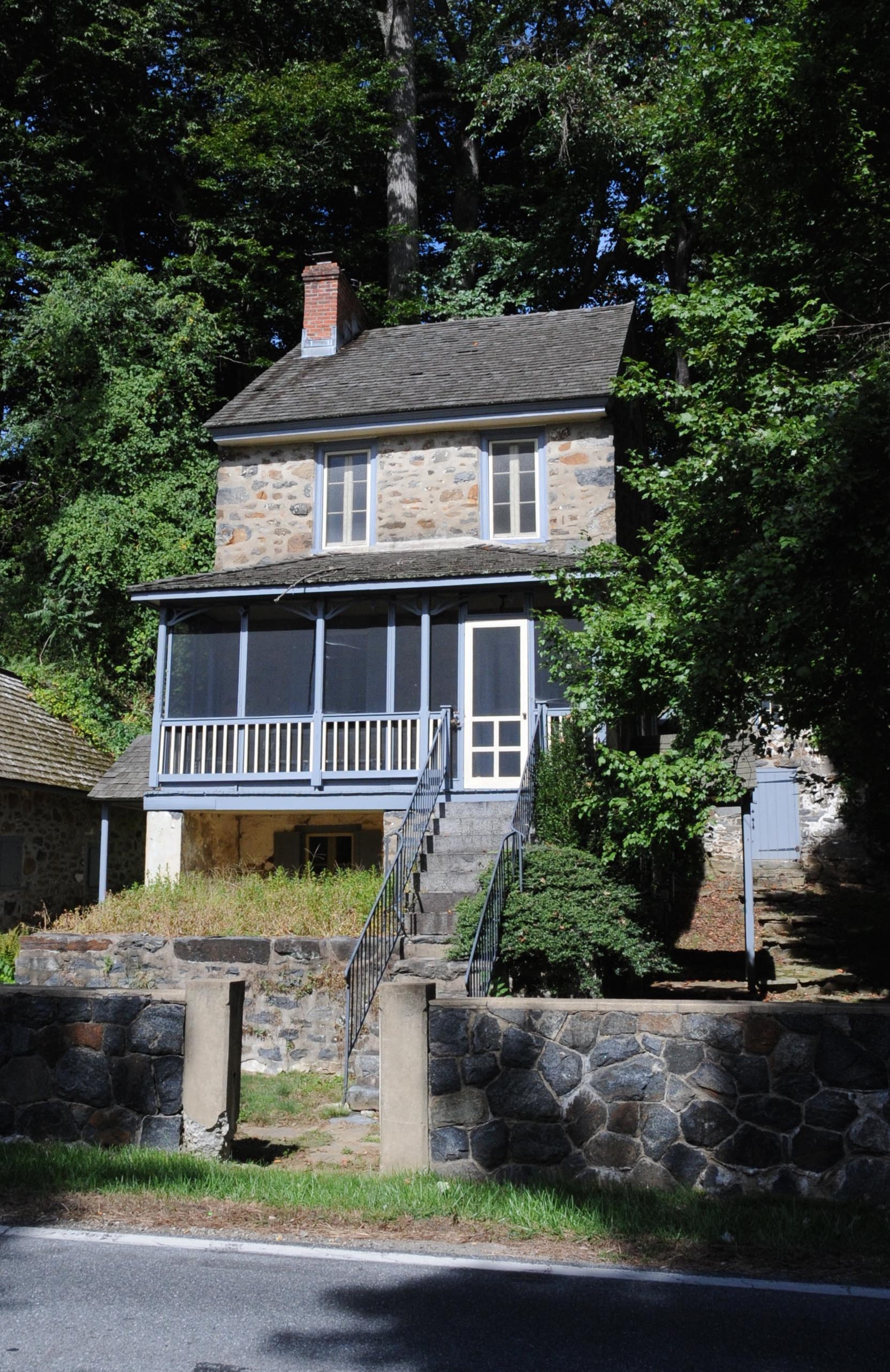
- Miller's house

- Location within Delaware Location within the United States
- Location: 204 & 411 Rockland Rd., near Montchanin, Delaware
- Coordinates: 39°47′32″N 75°35′02″W
- Area: 12.8 acres (5.2 ha)
- Built: 1701
- Built by: Gregg, John
- Architectural style: Colonial, William Penn Style
- NRHP reference No.: 73000520
- Added to NRHP: July 16, 1973

Strand Millas and Rock Spring is a historic home located near Montchanin in New Castle County, Delaware, United States. The name "Strand Millas" is derived from an industrial town near Belfast, Ireland. The Strand Millas house was built in 1701, and is a 2 1/2 story, quarried stone dwelling. It was expanded with one room on each floor during the 1760s. Strand Millas was the home of du Pont heiress Louisa d'Andelot Carpenter after her marriage in 1929.

Across from the main house is the Rock Spring springhouse. Adjacent to the spring is a dwelling said by some to have been built in the 1680s, but it was extensively remodeled during the 19th century.

It was added to the National Register of Historic Places in 1973.

== Gallery ==
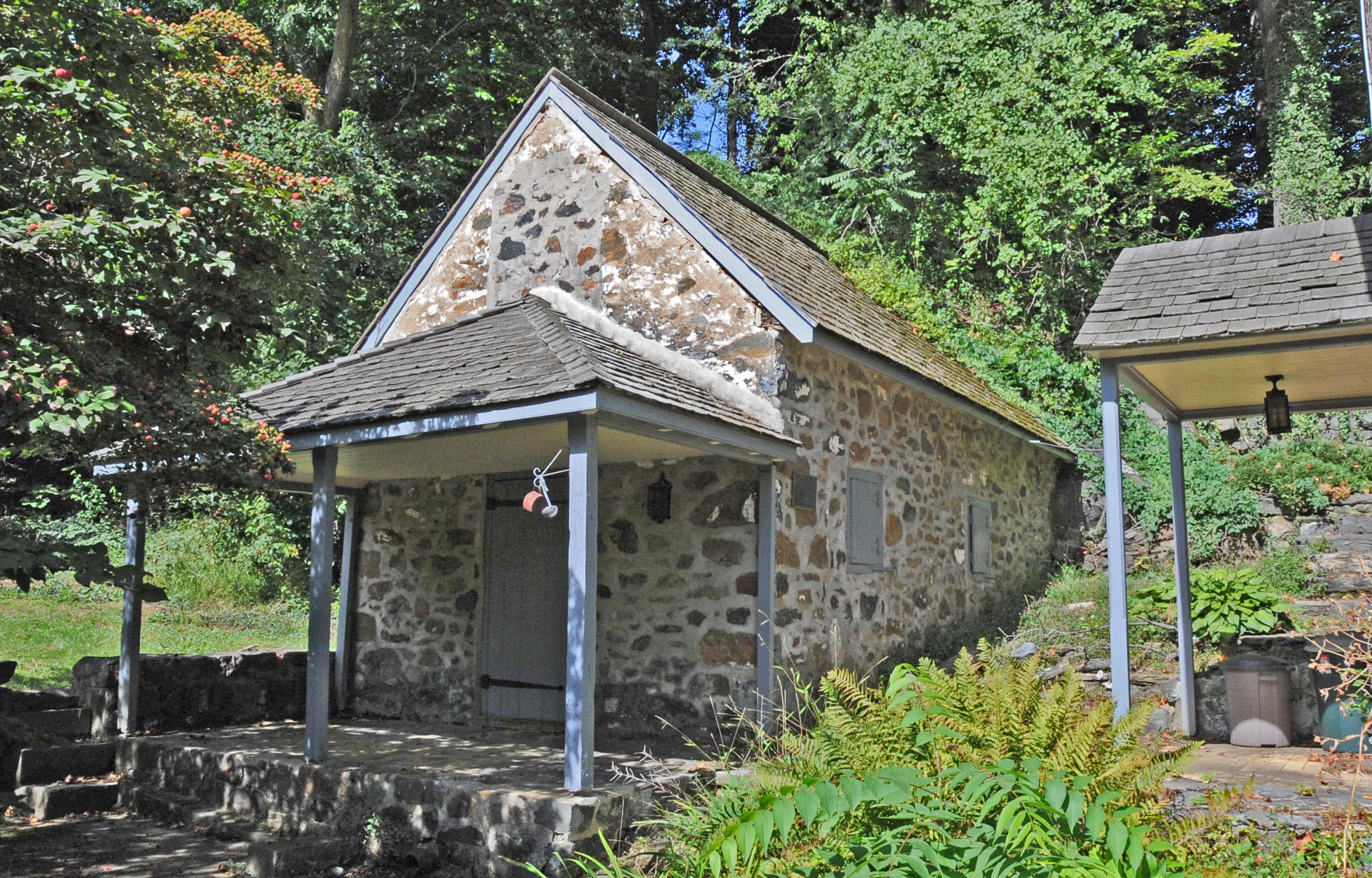
Springhouse

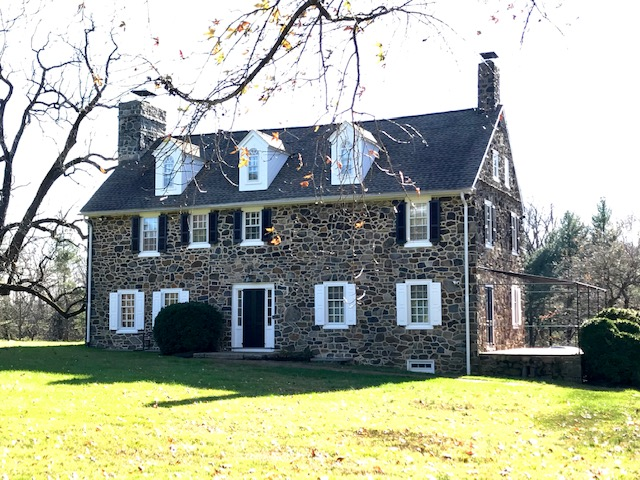
Strand Millas, 1701
