= Scene at the Signing of the Constitution of the United States =

1940 painting by Howard Chandler Christy

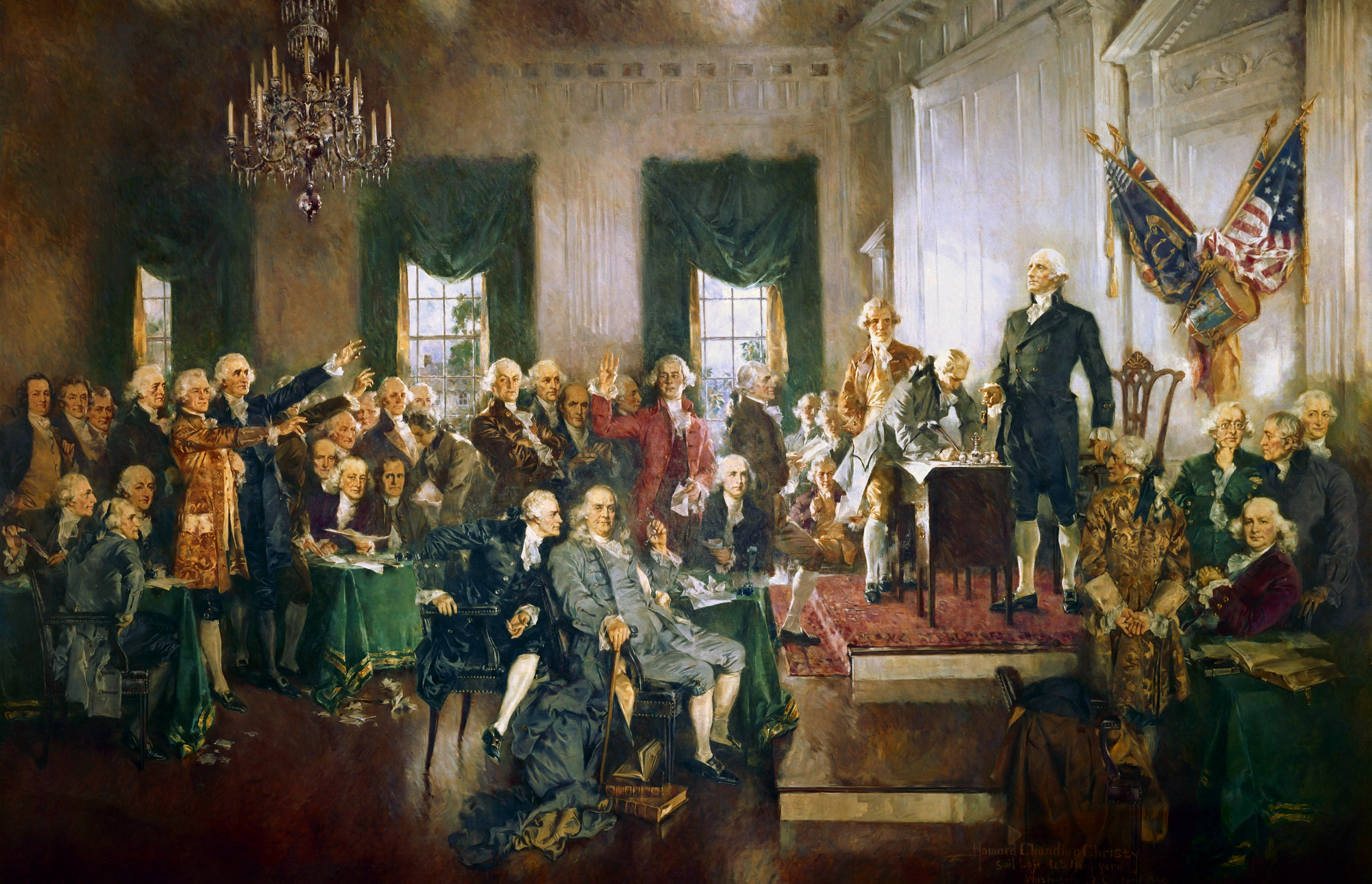
Howard Chandler Christy's Scene at the Signing of the Constitution of the United States

Scene at the Signing of the Constitution of the United States is a 1940 oil-on-canvas painting by Howard Chandler Christy, depicting the signing of the United States Constitution at Independence Hall in Philadelphia on September 17, 1787, at the conclusion of the Constitutional Convention. Along with Washington Crossing the Delaware by Emanuel Leutze, the painting is one of the most famous depictions of the early days of the United States. Christy created the painting in April 1940; because of its large size (20 by 30 feet or 6.1 by 9.1 metres), Christy painted it in a sail loft. Since late 1941, it has been displayed along the east stairway in the House of Representatives wing in the United States Capitol.

== Description ==
Only 39 of the 55 delegates are pictured in the painting; not included are the three delegates who did not sign the Constitution or the 13 delegates who left the convention. On the right side of the painting, on the dais, George Washington, president of the convention, stands upright and looks out over the delegates. The Constitution and the Syng inkstand are on a desk before him, and Richard Spaight of North Carolina is signing the document. The windows are open and an aura of light surrounds Washington's upper body. Behind him are displayed American flags and a drum. Also behind him James Wilson of Pennsylvania and Richard Bassett of Delaware are talking. Behind them on the far right is Delaware delegate George Read; below them is Pennsylvania delegate Robert Morris, and standing slightly to the right of Washington is Daniel of St. Thomas Jenifer from Maryland.

William Jackson, the convention's secretary, is prominently placed directly in the center. Standing, in red, and holding up four fingers, he apparently is counting the votes. At his left elbow, James Madison observes the proceedings. Between Jackson's right hand and head is William Paterson. Benjamin Franklin is seated in the center, and Alexander Hamilton leans toward him. Standing directly behind Hamilton is Gouverneur Morris of Pennsylvania. The South Carolina delegation is depicted in the painting's left corner. Also seated on the left, distinguished by their multi-colored silk coats, are Jonathan Dayton, Rufus King (on Dayton's left) and Nathaniel Gorham.

== Commissioning ==
Representative Sol Bloom, the Director General of the United States Constitution Sesquicentennial Commission, first proposed that the painting be commissioned in 1937 as part of the 150th anniversary of the Constitution. Howard Chandler Christy, one of the most popular illustrators and portrait painters of the time, had created an historically accurate scene of the signing for the commission to reproduce. His first small painting included a maiden representing "We the People" and numerous other symbolic figures, but these were eliminated in the final version. In the three years during which Representative Bloom worked with Christy to locate early portraits of the signers and to fill in historical details, he became aware that there was no scene of the signing of the Constitution in the U.S. Capitol, and few other paintings in existence included all the signers.

A Joint Resolution was first introduced in the House in 1937 to pay Christy $35,000 to paint Signing of the Constitution. Heated debate arose, however: some members of Congress were in favor of memorializing one of the greatest events in American history, but others held deep reservations about spending the funds for art during a period of severe economic depression, and the bill did not pass. The Joint Resolution failed again in 1938.

Finally, in 1939, a modified resolution, P.R. 11, 76th Congress, was accepted to set up a commission consisting of the Vice President, the Speaker of the House, and the Architect of the Capitol to employ an artist to paint a 20-by-30-foot (6.1 by 9.1 m) scene of the signing at a price of $30,000. The contract with Christy was signed on July 24, 1939. On October 29, 1940, the Congress approved $1500 for the purchase of a frame, which was accepted by the Joint Committee on the Library on December 26, 1940.

== Research and work ==
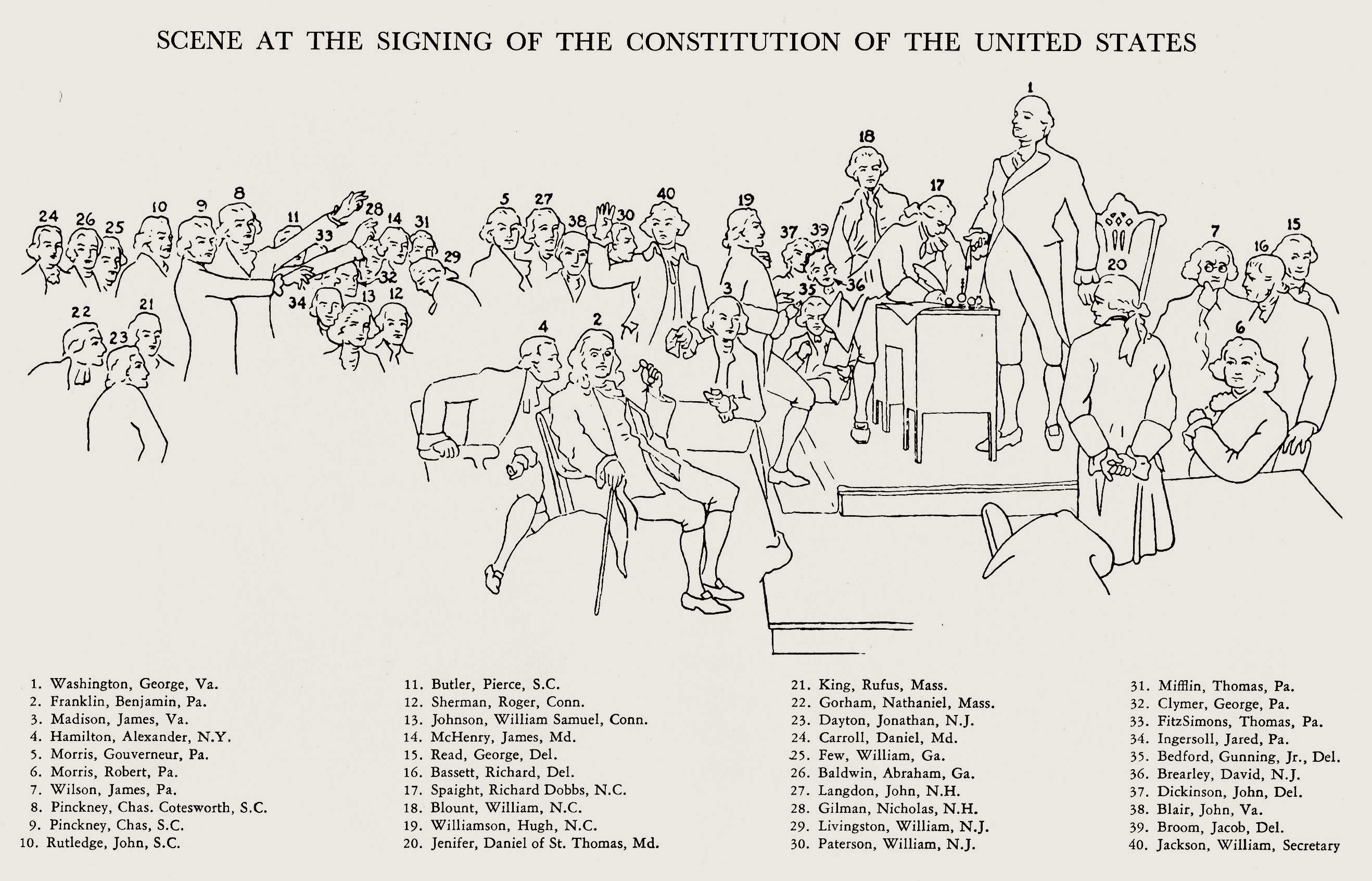
Key to figures in the painting

To achieve the greatest possible accuracy, Christy searched for portraits by the best artists of the late 18th and early 19th centuries, such as Charles Willson Peale and Gilbert Stuart. He located portraits of thirty-seven out of the thirty-nine delegates and the Secretary, William Jackson. Christy took some liberties in composing his scene: John Dickinson, whose signature was added by proxy, is included, and three men who were present but did not sign are not shown. He obscured the faces of the two signers (Thomas FitzSimons and Jacob Broom) of whom no portraits were found. He also researched authentic costumes, including a pair of George Washington's breeches borrowed from the Smithsonian Institution, and he depicted the furniture and artifacts used by the delegates. The books beside Franklin's chair were part of Thomas Jefferson's library; Christy borrowed them from the Rare Book Room of the Library of Congress and included them in the scene to acknowledge Jefferson's importance to the Constitution. He made the sketch for the painting in Independence Hall in September, at the same time of day as the signing, to show accurately the angle of sunlight in the room with its glass chandelier. The artist said that the flags he depicted are the Stars and Stripes, one from a Maryland dragoon regiment, and regimental colors from Massachusetts and New Hampshire.

The 18-by-26-foot (5.5 by 7.9 m) canvas was painted in the sail loft of the Washington Navy Yard, where Christy at times used enlisted men as models for the figures. After five years of research and seven months of painting, the canvas was dedicated in May 1940 in the Rotunda of the Capitol, where it was on view for 16 months. The 20-by-30-foot (6.1 by 9.1 m) frame, made in nine sections including the central eagle and crest, was hand carved and given a gold-leaf finish by Azeglio Pancani of New York. After much debate about where it could be hung, another painting was moved and the Christy in its frame was installed in the east grand stairway of the House, where it remains today.

== Vandalism and restoration ==
In 1967 the painting was vandalized by being slashed along the bottom; the canvas had to be removed from the stretcher to be transported for repair in 1968. The fills made then were apparent, however, and over time dust, grime, and yellowed varnish obscured the original brilliant colors. In 2006 the painting was cleaned and conserved in place by conservators working from a large four-level scaffold from mid-October through December. The cleaning of areas that had looked dull brown revealed lively expressions, detailed costumes and impressionist colors, such as lavender and pink, applied with scintillating brushwork. The vandalized area was given special attention and is now barely visible. Finally, a new coating of clear protective varnish was applied.

The frame, which had been covered with bronze powder paint in 1968, was taken apart in sections and conserved off site. It was cleaned and repaired, regilded with 22-karat gold leaf similar to the color of the original metal leaf, and toned to complement the painting.

== See also ==
- Declaration of Independence, an 1819 portrait by John Trumbull
- Founding Fathers of the United States
- List of paintings of George Washington

== Sources ==
This article incorporates public domain material from the Architect of the Capitol

- Lloyd, Gordon. "About Howard Chandler Christy's Scene at the Signing of the Constitution of the United States."
