= Jacob Broom House =

Historic house in Delaware, US

- U.S. National Register of Historic Places
- U.S. National Historic Landmark
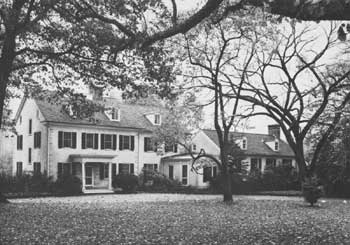
- 1975 HABS photo

- Location within Delaware Location within the United States
- Location: Christchurch Rd., near Hagley Museum and Library, Montchanin, Delaware
- Coordinates: 39.78019°N 75.57824°W
- Area: 2 acres (0.81 ha)
- Built: 1795
- Architect: Jacob Broom
- Architectural style: Late Georgian
- NRHP reference No.: 74000602

Significant dates
- Added to NRHP: December 2, 1974
- Designated NHL: December 2, 1974

The Jacob Broom House, also known historically as Hagley, is a historic house on Christchurch Road near Montchanin, Delaware, United States. It was built in 1795 by Founding Father Jacob Broom, one of the Delaware signers of the United States Constitution. The house was purchased in 1802 by Éleuthère Irénée du Pont, progenitor of the prominent Du Pont family and founder of the DuPont chemical concern, who established the Eleutherian Mills below the house on the banks of Brandywine Creek. The house, which remains in the hands of Du Pont descendants, was declared a National Historic Landmark in 1974 for its association with Broom.

== Description and history ==
The Jacob Broom House is located northwest of Wilmington, Delaware, on a terrace overlooking Brandywine Creek southeast of the village of Montchanin. It is located between the two portions of the Hagley Museum and Library, which commemorates the early industrial history of the du Pont family. The central portion of the house is a 2 1/2-story masonry structure with a dormered gable roof and end chimneys. The main facade is four bays wide, with the entrance in the center-left bay.

Jacob Broom (1752–1810) was born in Wilmington, trained as a surveyor, and had a long and varied career, operating several business ventures. In 1787 he was elected one of Delaware's delegates to the Philadelphia Convention, which drafted the United States Constitution. In 1795 he acquired about 65 acres (26 ha) of land on the west bank of Brandywine Creek and established a cotton mill, building a long stone-lined raceway and dam. This house was built on a terrace overlooking the mill site and is the only significant structure associated with Broom's life.

Broom's mill burned after a few years, and Broom sold the entire property in 1802 to Éleuthère Irénée du Pont, a French immigrant. Du Pont brought detailed knowledge of the production of gunpowder and soon established a powder mill on the property, using this house as an early residence and business headquarters. Successful in his business, du Pont later built the mansion house that is now part of the Hagley Museum complex.

This house was occupied by Eleuthera du Pont Smith and her husband, Thomas Mackie Smith, until 1873 and by Francis G. du Pont until 1919. The house underwent significant additions during Francis' occupation, giving it a distinctly Victorian character while maintaining the core structure. The DuPont company purchased the building in 1919 and sold it in 1933 to Irene du Pont, who bought it for her daughter. The house remains in the family as a private residence, but most of the Victorian alterations have been removed, and more stylistically sympathetic additions have been made to it.

== See also ==
- List of National Historic Landmarks in Delaware
- National Register of Historic Places listings in northern New Castle County, Delaware
