= R. R. M. Carpenter =

American industrialist and baseball executive

- Born: Robert Ruliph Morgan Carpenter; August 30, 1877; Wilkes-Barre, Pennsylvania, US
- Died: June 11, 1949 (aged 71); Wilmington, Delaware, US
- Education: Hillman Academy; Massachusetts Institute of Technology
- Spouse: Margaretta Lammot du Pont
- Children: Louisa d'Andelot Carpenter; Robert Ruliph Morgan Carpenter II
- Relatives: Robert Ruliph Morgan Carpenter III, grandson

Robert Ruliph Morgan Carpenter (Sr.) (July 30, 1877 – June 11, 1949) was an American executive, Major League Baseball franchise owner, and member of the board of directors of DuPont.

== Biography ==
He was born on July 30, 1877, to Walter Samuel Carpenter and Bedde Morgan.

Known as "Ruly", Carpenter was educated at the Hillman Academy in his hometown of Wilkes-Barre, Pennsylvania, and at Massachusetts Institute of Technology.

He worked in his family's hardware store before joining DuPont as a district purchasing agent in 1906. He married Margaretta Lammot du Pont, the sister of company president Pierre S. du Pont, on December 18, 1906. They had a son, Robert Ruliph Morgan Carpenter Jr.

He began working under another brother, Irénée du Pont in the development department, of which he was named director in 1911. Carpenter was instrumental in guiding the company's diversification outside the explosives industry, being appointed to the executive committee and serving on the board of directors from 1914 until his death in 1949. During his tenure, he held positions including head of personnel and vice president. His younger brother, Walter S. Carpenter Jr., was President of DuPont from 1940 to 1948.

In 1940, Carpenter joined the board of trustees of the University of Delaware, and was a major catalyst for the development of its athletic program, personally funding the construction of a new gymnasium. In 1943, he purchased the Philadelphia Phillies of the National League. He left day-to-day control in the hands of his son, R. R. M. Carpenter Jr., who continued his father's tradition of substantial support for the University of Delaware’s athletic program after his father's death.

Carpenter also served as president of Wilmington's Homeopathic Hospital, as a trustee of Philadelphia's Academy of Natural Sciences, and as director of the Girard Trust Company, and of the Philadelphia, Baltimore and Washington Railroad.

He died on June 11, 1949, of cancer at Memorial Hospital in Wilmington, Delaware.

== Children ==
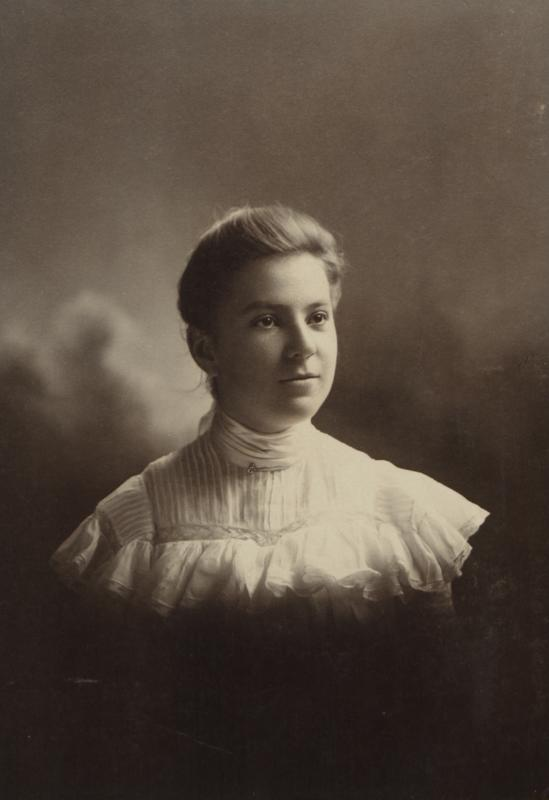
Margaretta Lammot (du Pont) Carpenter, 1884-1973.jpg

- Louisa d'Andelot Carpenter (October 16, 1907 - February 1976, Easton, Maryland)
- Irene "Renee" du Pont Carpenter Draper (January 21, 1911 - January 28, 1991)
- Nancy Gardiner Carpenter (June 19, 1912 - July 13, 1914)
- Robert Ruliph Morgan Carpenter Jr. (August 31, 1915 - July 8, 1990)
- William Kemble Carpenter (May 27, 1919 - August 1987 Boca Raton, Florida)
