= William Jackson (secretary) =

Secretary to the 1787 United States Constitutional Convention

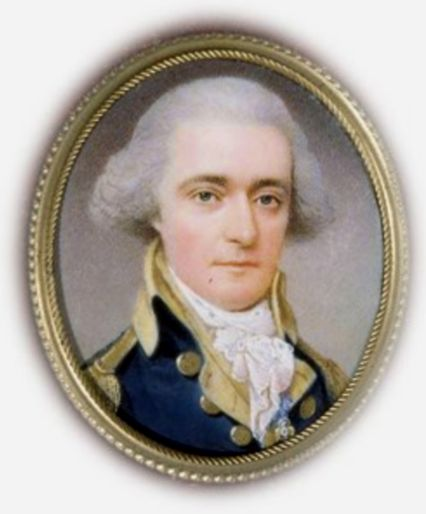
- Jackson depicted in a portrait, c. 1795
- Born: March 9, 1759; Cumberland, England
- Died: December 17, 1828 (aged 69); Philadelphia, Pennsylvania, U.S.
- Occupations: Military officer, merchant, lawyer, secretary, civil servant, editor
- Spouse: Elizabeth Willing

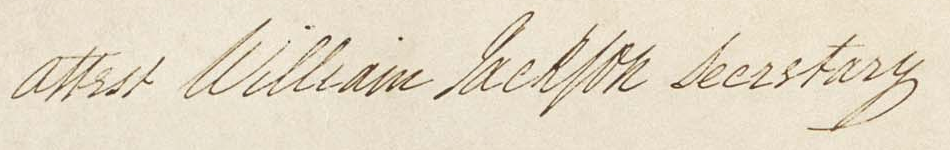
Jackson's signature on the U.S. Constitution

William Jackson (March 9, 1759 – December 17, 1828) was a prominent figure in the American Revolution and one of the Founding Fathers of the United States. He served as secretary to the 1787 United States Constitutional Convention, and as part of his duties added his signature to the United States Constitution. He also served with distinction in the Continental Army during the Revolutionary War. Jackson served as secretary general of the Society of the Cincinnati. After the war, he served as one of President George Washington's personal secretaries. As President, Washington appointed Jackson Surveyor for the Port of Philadelphia.

== Early life ==
Jackson was born in Cumberland, England, on March 9, 1759. He was sent to Charleston, South Carolina, after his parents died, and was raised by a family friend and prominent merchant, Owen Roberts, who was the commander of a militia battalion. After the American Revolutionary War began in 1775, Roberts joined the Patriot side, and Jackson, then a teenager, followed. Roberts likely helped Jackson to obtain a position as a cadet in the 1st South Carolina Regiment. In May 1776 Jackson was commissioned as a second lieutenant.

== Career ==
=== Revolutionary War ===
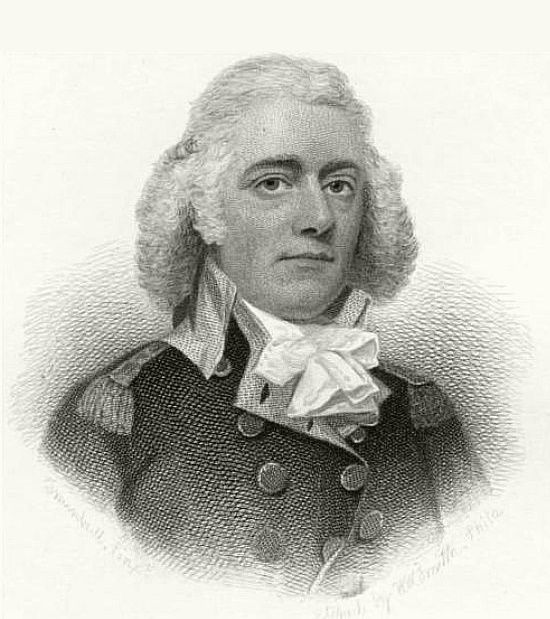
Major William Jackson

Jackson first saw action near Charleston, South Carolina, in June 1776, when his regiment fought off General Henry Clinton's attempted attack on Fort Sullivan. The unit then spent a long period garrisoning Charleston, during which Charles Cotesworth Pinckney assumed command of the 1st South Carolina. In late 1777, Jackson was part of the detachment that made an ill-conceived and poorly conducted expedition against St. Augustine in British East Florida under Major General Robert Howe. The expedition was a colossal failure, and the American force was struck down by disease. Jackson, however, survived, and returned to South Carolina in 1778.

After returning from Florida, the Southern regiments were placed under the command of Major General Benjamin Lincoln from Massachusetts Bay Colony. Pinckney convinced Lincoln that as a Northerner, he needed an aide to assist him in relating to his Southern troops. Jackson was chosen for this position and was temporarily promoted to the rank of major. As Lincoln's aide Jackson saw action in May 1779 during the skirmish at Tullifiny Bridge, and the Battle of Stono Ferry and the Siege of Savannah in 1779. In 1780, General Lincoln surrendered his troops after the lengthy siege of Charleston. As a captured officer, Jackson was shipped to Philadelphia, then held by the British. After a few months he was returned to the Continental Army in an exchange of prisoners.

A skilled staff officer, Jackson was then assigned to the staff of Continental Army general George Washington, serving as secretary to the general's aide John Laurens, son of Henry Laurens of South Carolina. When Laurens was sent to France in 1781 armed with a memorial written by Washington outlining why a sizable loan (25 million livres) was needed, he took Thomas Paine and Jackson, who was fluent in French. For six weeks, they dealt unsuccessfully at Versaille with Foreign Affairs Minister Vergennes, a longtime diplomat who wanted England tied up in an American war but knew the precarious situation of France's own finances.

Against the advice of Benjamin Franklin, direct contact was made with the king, and Washington's memorial was handed to him. The following day, the king directed Finance Minister Jacques Necker to meet with them. The loan was made, the bulk of it for military supplies, including three million in gold specie, with the promise that France would underwrite with Dutch agents a later loan for 10 million should it be needed. Purchases began, and by early May Laurens sailed with 3 ships and Jackson went to Holland where John Adams had contracted with a captain for a fourth ship. That ship vanished, either because Adams had been deceived about the honesty of the captain or because the British Navy, with orders to hunt down all four ships, had sunk it. The three ships, however, arrived in Boston in early September.

Jackson returned to the United States in February 1782, and served as assistant secretary of war under Benjamin Lincoln. After helping settle the Pennsylvania Mutiny of 1783, he resigned his office and his commission in October 1783 to become Robert Morris's agent in England.

=== Constitutional Convention ===
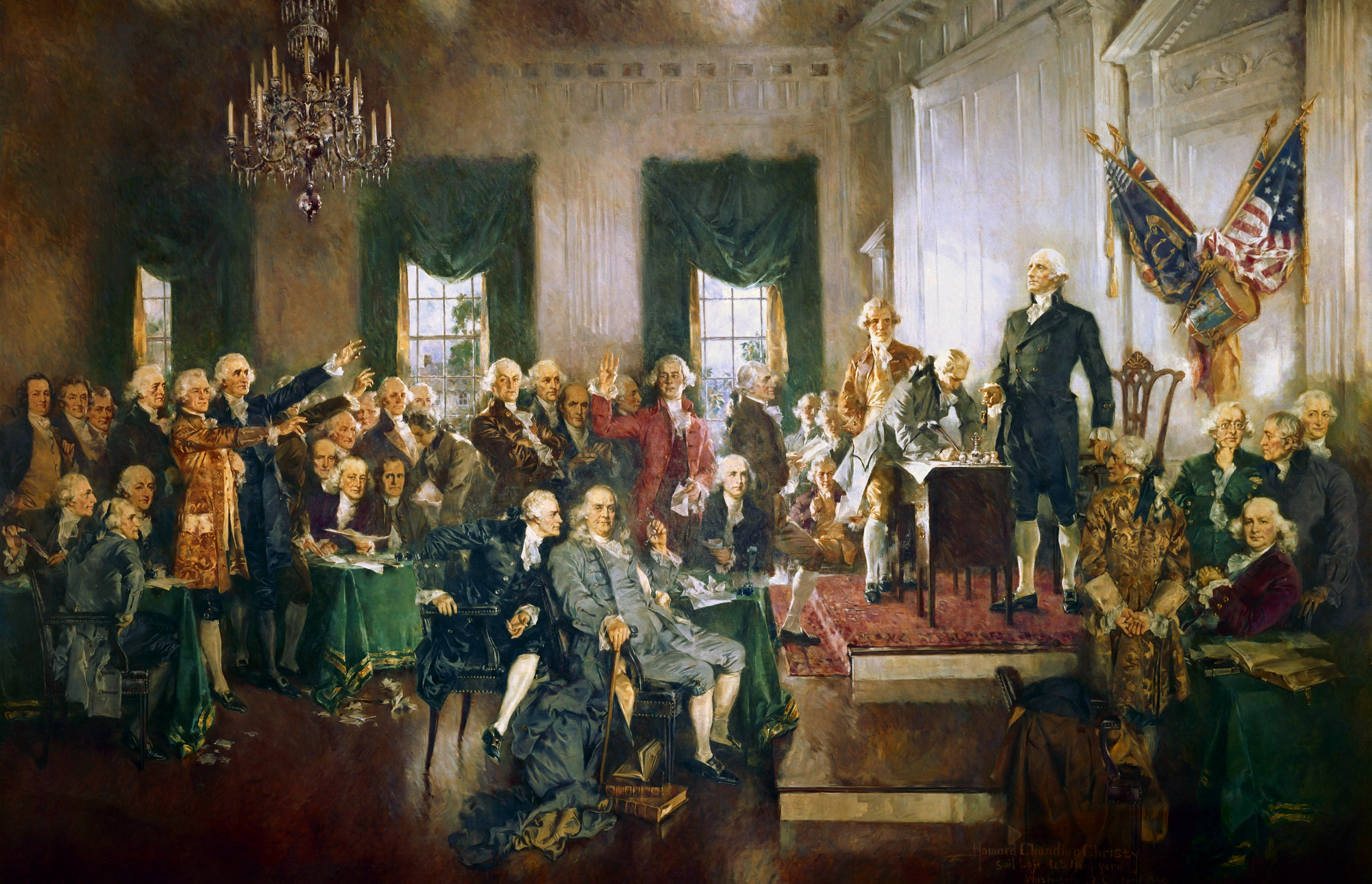
Jackson (standing, center, in red) depicted in Scene at the Signing of the Constitution of the United States, a 1940 painting by Howard Chandler Christy

When Jackson returned the following year, he studied law with Philadelphia lawyer William Lewis. As an impoverished law student, Jackson wrote to Washington in 1787, applying for the post of secretary to the Philadelphia Convention. On the Convention's first day of business, May 25, 1787, Alexander Hamilton nominated Jackson to the post, and the delegates chose him over William Temple Franklin, Benjamin Franklin's grandson, despite the latter's experience serving as his grandfather's secretary during the Treaty of Paris negotiations.

As the Convention secretary, Jackson was responsible for maintaining the secrecy of the Convention's proceedings, keeping official minutes, and destroying many of the proceedings' other records. He signed the document "Attest William Jackson Secretary" to attest to four corrections which had been made to the document.

Jackson was sent to the Congress of the Confederation, assembled in New York City, with a copy of the Constitution, and was honored to read it out to the Congress just days after the signing, on September 20, 1787.

=== Secretary of President Washington ===
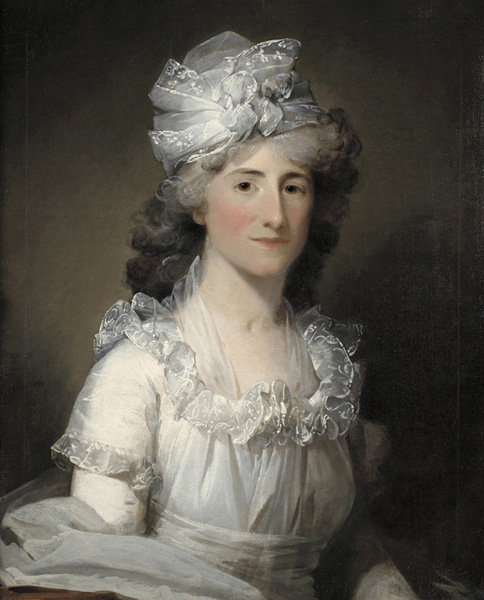
Portrait of Elizabeth Willing Jackson by Gilbert Stuart, 1798

Jackson was admitted to the Pennsylvania Bar in 1788, but was required to wait two years to practice before the Pennsylvania Supreme Court, the most lucrative branch of the law; besides this, he was an unpaid volunteer in the Second Philadelphia Light Horse. He applied to be secretary of the United States Senate, but Samuel Allyne Otis was appointed. He then applied to be personal secretary to George Washington after Washington was elected the nation's first president of the United States in the 1788–89 United States presidential election, writing that he had unpaid expenses as a Continental officer and that business was "not congenial to [his] temper."

=== Agent to Secretary of War ===
He served as Washington's personal secretary until 1791, when he left to restart his law practice and work as agent for William Bingham and Secretary of War Henry Knox, who were selling off a large land grant in Maine first acquired by William Duer, first Undersecretary of the Treasury and now bankrupt. Jackson's job was selling land on commission in England and France; among his potential customers was the Committee of Public Safety. They declined to invest their scant funds in Maine land; but Jackson wrote a very favorable report on them back to the United States.

=== Surveyor for Port of Philadelphia ===
He returned to the United States in the summer of 1795, and married Elizabeth Willing, Mrs. Bingham's sister, in November; they were the oldest daughters of Thomas Willing, a rich Philadelphia merchant, related to the Shippens. In January 1796, during his last months in office, Washington, who attended Jackson's wedding, appointed Jackson Surveyor for the Port of Philadelphia. Thomas Jefferson, another wedding guest, dismissed him in 1801 for politicizing his office.

=== Political and Commercial Register ===
Jackson then started a Federalist newspaper, the Political and Commercial Register, in Philadelphia. and edited it until 1815.

=== Society of the Cincinnati ===
Jackson succeeded Henry Knox in 1799 as secretary general of the Society of the Cincinnati, a group of former Continental Army officers.

Jackson became Secretary of the General Society of the Cincinnati, on invitation of the State Society of the Cincinnati of Pennsylvania, where he authored and delivered a eulogy on the character of the deceased Washington.

On July 4 1786 on the 10th anniversary of Independence the Pennsylvania branch of the Society requested Major Jackson to deliver an oration before the assembly.

On behalf of the remaining officers of the war, he headed an unsuccessful effort to lobby Congress to grant all veteran Revolutionary officers half-pay for life in 1818. Congress was to pass such a bill in 1826, fifty years after independence, but Jackson was not associated with it; his last public appearance was welcoming the Marquis de Lafayette to Philadelphia in 1824. In 1838 he was appointed Assistant Treasures-General. He remained secretary general of the society until his death.

== Death ==
On December 18, 1828, at age 69, Jackson died in Philadelphia, and was interred at Christ Church Burial Ground in Philadelphia, where Benjamin Franklin was earlier interred in 1790. Jackson's wife, of thirty-two years, Elizabeth, died on August 5, 1858, and lies buried beside him.

== William Jackson papers ==
The writings and other papers of Jackson are kept at Yale University in the Archive Department. The collection is relatively small, consisting of about 120 items. Most of the collection includes correspondence received by Jackson from 1782 to 1828 from notable figures involved with the Revolution, including George Washington, Thomas Jefferson, John Quincy Adams, Henry Knox, etc.

== See also ==
- Samuel Osgood House — First Presidential Mansion.
- Alexander Macomb House — Second Presidential Mansion.
- President's House (Philadelphia) — Third Presidential Mansion.
