= R. R. M. Carpenter Jr. =

American baseball executive

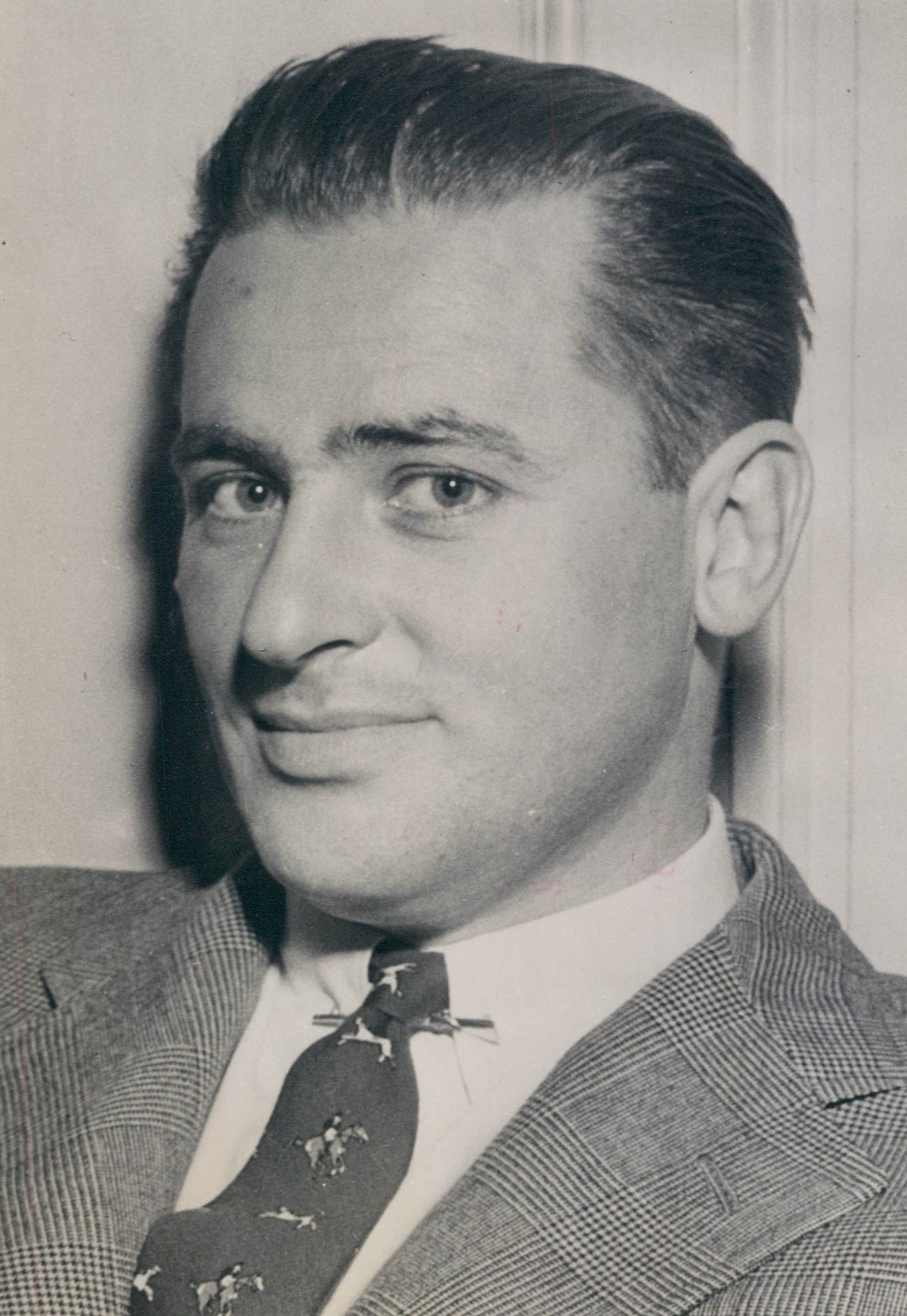
- Carpenter in 1943
- Born: Robert Ruliph Morgan; Carpenter Jr. August 31, 1915; Wilmington, Delaware, U.S.
- Died: July 8, 1990 (aged 74); Montchanin, Delaware, U.S.
- Occupation: Major League Baseball club owner
- Years active: 1943–1981

Robert Ruliph Morgan Carpenter Jr. (August 31, 1915 – July 8, 1990) was an American owner and club president of the Philadelphia Phillies of Major League Baseball. When he took command of the Phillies in November 1943 after his father and he purchased the franchise, the 28-year-old Carpenter became the youngest club president in baseball history. He became sole owner upon his father's death in 1949 and would serve as president of the Phillies until 1972, when his son succeeded him. The Carpenter family owned the Phillies from 1943 to 1981; they also were known as the Blue Jays from 1944 to 1949.

== Early life ==
R. R. M. Carpenter Jr. was typically referred to as Bob Carpenter throughout baseball; both his father and his son were informally known as "Ruly." He was born on August 31, 1915, in Wilmington, Delaware, to the elder Carpenter and Margaretta Lammot Du Pont. Aside from baseball and boxing Carpenter was wealthy from investments and family relations with the DuPont family of the DuPont Conglomerate.

Bob Carpenter attended Duke University, where he starred in football. He married Mary Kaye Phelps on November 18, 1938. She was born on September 11, 1917, in Kentucky to Zack Phelps and Ethel Moreton Phelps.

== Career ==
=== Baseball ===
When his father, an industrialist and sportsman, bought the perennially cash-strapped Phillies in 1943—and when Bob Carpenter invested some of his fortune in talented young players such as Robin Roberts and Richie Ashburn (future members of the Baseball Hall of Fame) after World War II—they helped create the fabled "Whiz Kids" pennant-winning club of 1950. More important, they ensured that Philadelphia would remain a National League city. The Phils' rise of the late 1940s and early 1950s coincided with the final decline of the city's once-dominant American League club, the Athletics of Connie Mack. In 1955, the Athletics abandoned Philadelphia for Kansas City (through 1967), then Oakland (1968–2024), before beginning yet another relocation in 2025 that's destined to end in Las Vegas. Meanwhile, Carpenter and the Phillies bought Shibe Park (renamed "Connie Mack Stadium") from the A's, solidified their hold on Delaware Valley baseball fans, and moved into Veterans Stadium in 1971.

Although Carpenter admitted that he had only seen the Phillies play "two or three games" before his family purchased the team (and had not attended a National League game until 1940), the Carpenters were not new to running a baseball franchise: prior to their purchase of the Phillies, they had owned and operated a minor league baseball club, the original Wilmington Blue Rocks of the Interstate League (not to be confused with the current Carolina League franchise). Bob Carpenter took an active role in the management of the Phillies.

He and his father tried to polish the team's image and way of doing business. They wanted to shed the image of failure by changing the team's nickname. Before the 1944 season, the team held a fan contest soliciting a new team nickname. Management chose "Blue Jays," the fan submission of Elizabeth Crooks, who received a $100 war bond as compensation. Phillies management said that the Blue Jays name was as an official "additional nickname," meaning that the team had two official nicknames simultaneously, the Phillies and the Blue Jays. The new Blue Jays moniker was ultimately unpopular; it was officially dropped by the team in January 1950.

Carpenter went on to serve as the club's general manager without portfolio after the January 1948 death of Herb Pennock, through the 1950 NL pennant, and until April of 1954. For his efforts in rebuilding the franchise, Carpenter was hailed by the Sporting News as Major League Executive of the Year for 1949—one year before the Phils' pennant-winning campaign.

==== The 'Whiz Kids' and their aftermath ====
Led by Most Valuable Player Jim Konstanty, a relief pitcher who won 16 games and set an MLB standard with 74 games pitched, the Phillies improved their 1949 standing by capturing 91 games, and their second-all-time pennant on the final day of the season. They drew 1.217 million fans, first in the National League (and four times greater than the Athletics' home attendance). However, they were foiled in the 1950 World Series by the Yankees' dominant pitching.

But the 1950 Whiz Kids were not able to sustain their high level of play and were the last National League club to break the baseball color line, in 1957. The team hovered at and under .500 through the middle of the 1950s, then collapsed completely, finishing last from 1958 through 1961.

However, in 1962 the Phillies once again exceeded the .500 mark, and placed in the National League's first division in 1963. The following season, 1964, the Phils burst into the league lead and appeared headed for their third NL pennant in late September—only to lose ten games in succession and fritter away a 6½-game lead to finish tied for second. They would not contend again for a dozen years.

Carpenter retired in 1972, handing the team presidency to his son, Ruly, while remaining chairman of the board. In the same year, the Carpenters appointed Paul Owens, the team's shrewd farm system director, as general manager, and Owens would bring the Phils back to contending status from 1976–80, the last five years of the Carpenter family's ownership. With four division titles in five years, and the 1980 world title, the Phillies averaged 93 victories a season.

His Phillies won National League championships in 1950 and 1980, National League East Division titles in 1976, 1977, 1978, and 1980, and the 97-year-old team's first World Series title in 1980. Distressed by the free-spending, free-agent era, and anticipating the 1981 baseball strike, the Carpenters sold the Phils months after their World Series triumph. The team made the 1981 playoffs, and won the 1983 NL pennant under its new owners.

=== Boxing ===
In the 1940s Carpenter along with a friend, boxing promoter Ralph Tribuani established the Wilmington Sportsmens Club, converted Wilmington Baseball Park into a fight venue. Many shows and exhibitions were promoted, featuring future, current and former world champions and contenders, which included Lou Brooks, Al "Bummy" Davis, Lew Jenkins, Joey Maxim, Sugar Ray Robinson, Lee Savold and Al Tribuani.

== Personal life ==
In 1978, he was inducted into the Delaware Sports Hall of Fame. Bob Carpenter died of cancer at age 74 on July 8, 1990.

== See also ==
- List of Philadelphia Phillies award winners and league leaders

Preceded by Herb Pennock	Philadelphia Phillies General Manager; 1948–1954	Succeeded by Roy Hamey
Preceded by William D. Cox	Philadelphia Phillies President; 1943–1972	Succeeded by Ruly Carpenter
Preceded by Bill Veeck	Sporting News Major League Baseball Executive of the Year; 1949	Succeeded by George Weiss
