= Montchanin Historic District =

Historic district in Delaware, United States

- U.S. National Register of Historic Places
- U.S. Historic district
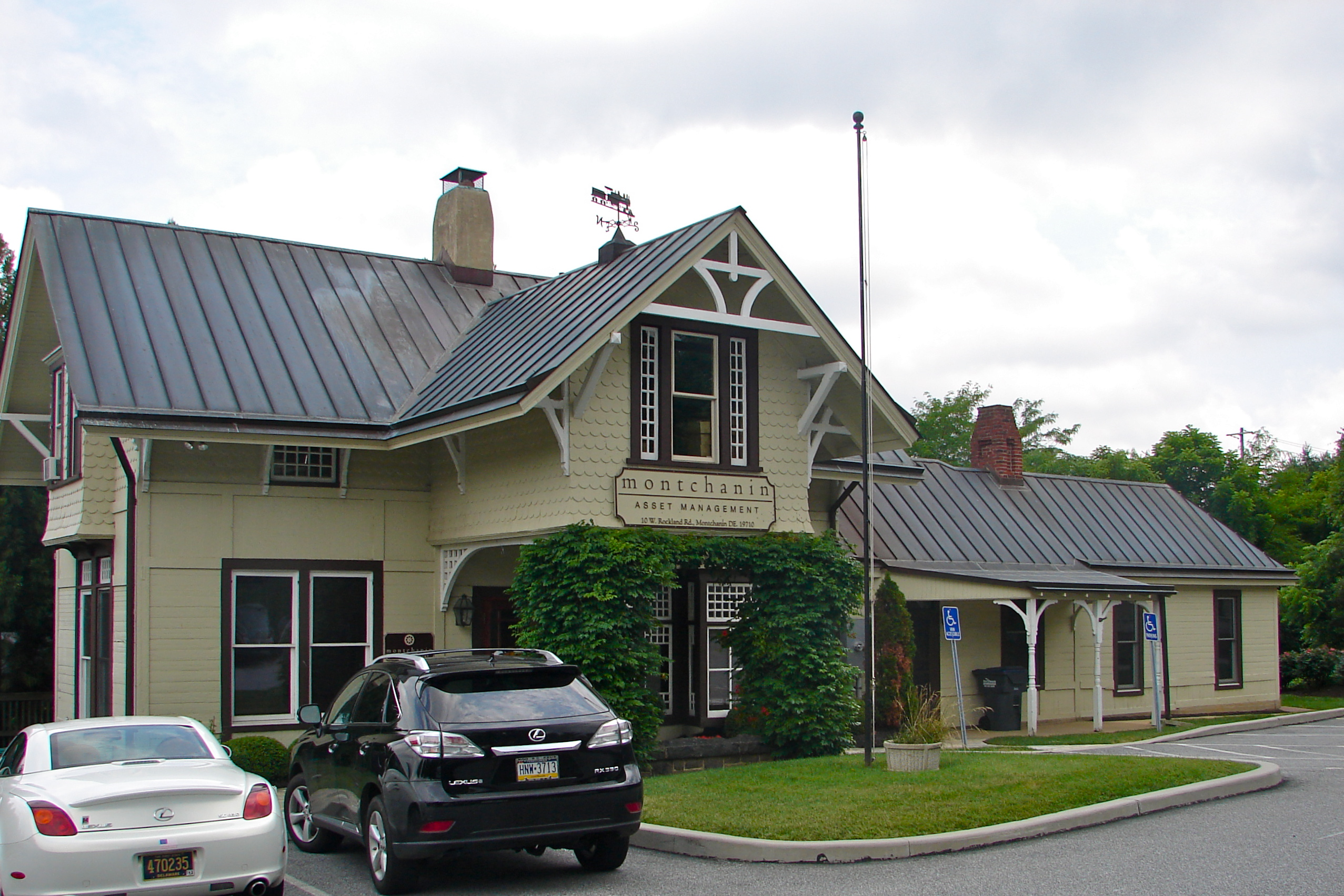
- Montchanin Station, Montchanin Historic District, June 2011

- Location within Delaware Location within the United States
- Location: DE 100, Montchanin, Delaware
- Coordinates: 39°47′21″N 75°35′18″W
- Area: 20.5 acres (8.3 ha)
- Built: 1870
- Built by: Wilmington & Northern Railroad Co.
- Architectural style: Late 19th and 20th Century Revivals, Late Victorian, Stick/eastlake
- NRHP reference No.: 78000900
- Added to NRHP: June 9, 1978

Montchanin Historic District is a national historic district located at Montchanin, New Castle County, Delaware. It encompasses 19 contributing buildings centered on the triangular area which was the original village of Montchanin. Notable buildings include the frame, stick-style railroad station (1889), stuccoed stone schoolhouse (1890), a stone bank barn, the blacksmith shop, and various cottages, dating from circa 1840 through the early-20th century.

It was added to the National Register of Historic Places in 1978.

Most or all of the village is currently included in the Inn at Montchanin Village, a hotel which is a member of Historic Hotels of America.
