= Jacob Broom =

American Founding Father and politician

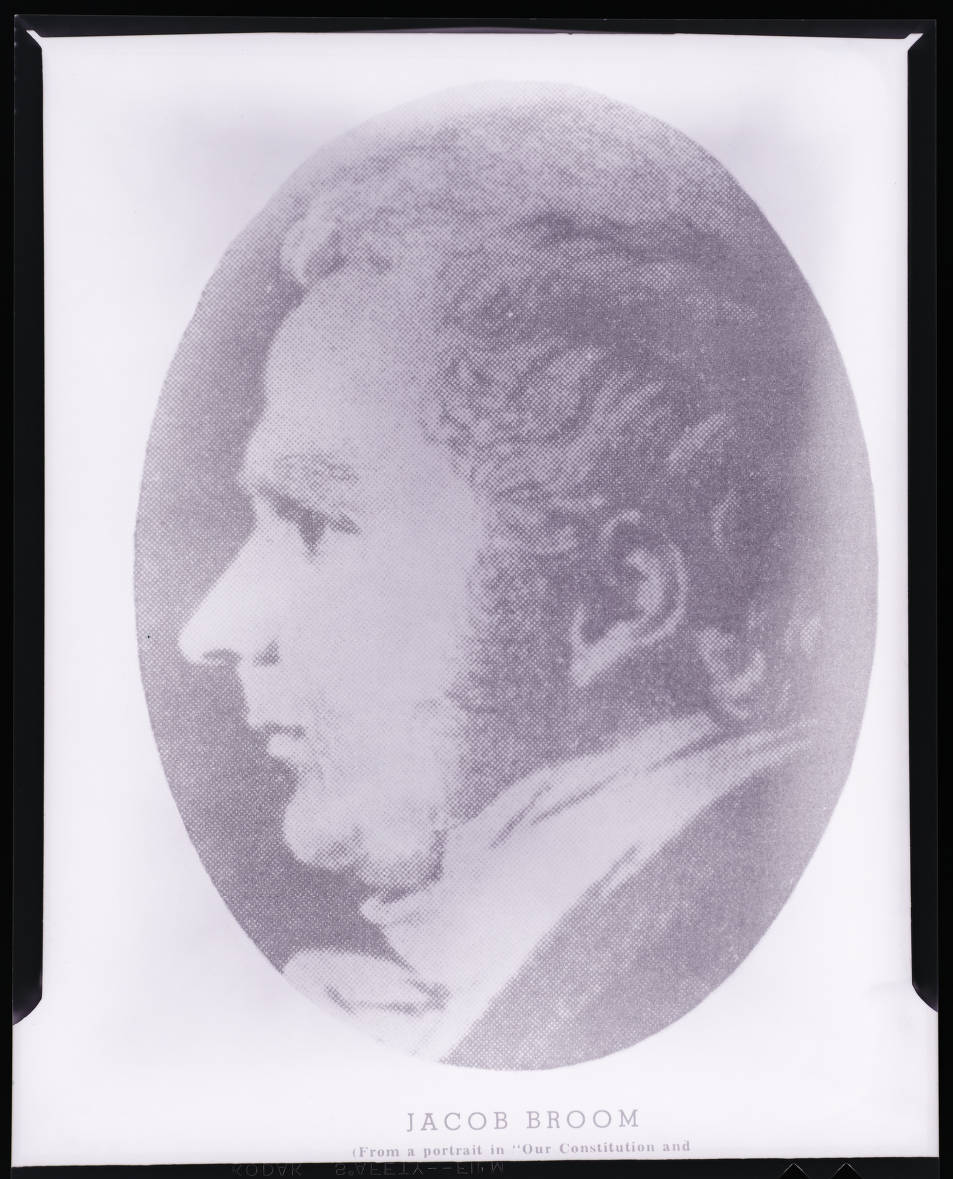
- Born: October 17, 1752; Wilmington, Delaware, British America
- Died: April 25, 1810 (aged 57); Philadelphia, Pennsylvania, U.S.
- Resting place: Christ Church Burial Ground, Philadelphia, Pennsylvania
- Occupations: Merchant, Surveyor, Politician, Manufacturer
- Known for: Signer of the United States Constitution, Contributions to the American Revolutionary War
- Spouse: Rachel Pierce (m. 1773)
- Children: 8, including James M. Broom
- Relatives: Jacob Broom (grandson)

Jacob Broom (October 17, 1752 – April 25, 1810) was an American Founding Father, businessman, and politician from Wilmington, Delaware. As a delegate to the U.S. Constitutional Convention of 1787, he was a signer of the United States Constitution. He was also appointed as a delegate to the Annapolis Convention in 1786 but did not attend, and he served in the Delaware General Assembly. He was the father of Congressman James M. Broom and grandfather of Congressman Jacob Broom.

== Early life ==
His father was James Broom, a blacksmith turned prosperous farmer, and his mother was Esther Willis, a Quaker. In 1773 he married Rachel Pierce, and together they raised eight children.

== Constitutional Convention ==
In his painting Scene at the Signing of the Constitution of the United States, Howard Chandler Christy obscured Broom's face because no portrait of Broom could be found.

Broom was a dedicated supporter of a strong central government who had been appointed as a commissioner to the Annapolis Convention in 1786, although he failed to attend. When George Washington visited Wilmington in 1783, Broom urged him to "contribute your advice and influence to promote that harmony and union of our infant governments which are so essential to the permanent establishment of our freedom, happiness, and prosperity."

Broom carried these opinions with him to Philadelphia, where he consistently voted for measures that would assure a powerful government responsive to the needs of the states. He favored a nine-year term limit for members of the Senate, where the states would be equally represented. He wanted the state legislatures to pay their representatives in Congress, which, in turn, would have the power to veto state laws. He also sought to vest state legislatures with the power to select presidential electors, and he wanted the president to hold office for life. Broom faithfully attended the sessions of the Convention in Philadelphia and spoke out several times on issues that he considered crucial, but he left most of the speech-making to more influential and experienced delegates. Georgia delegate William Pierce described him as "a plain good Man, with some abilities, but nothing to render him conspicuous. He is silent in public, but cheerful and conversable in private."

== Later career ==
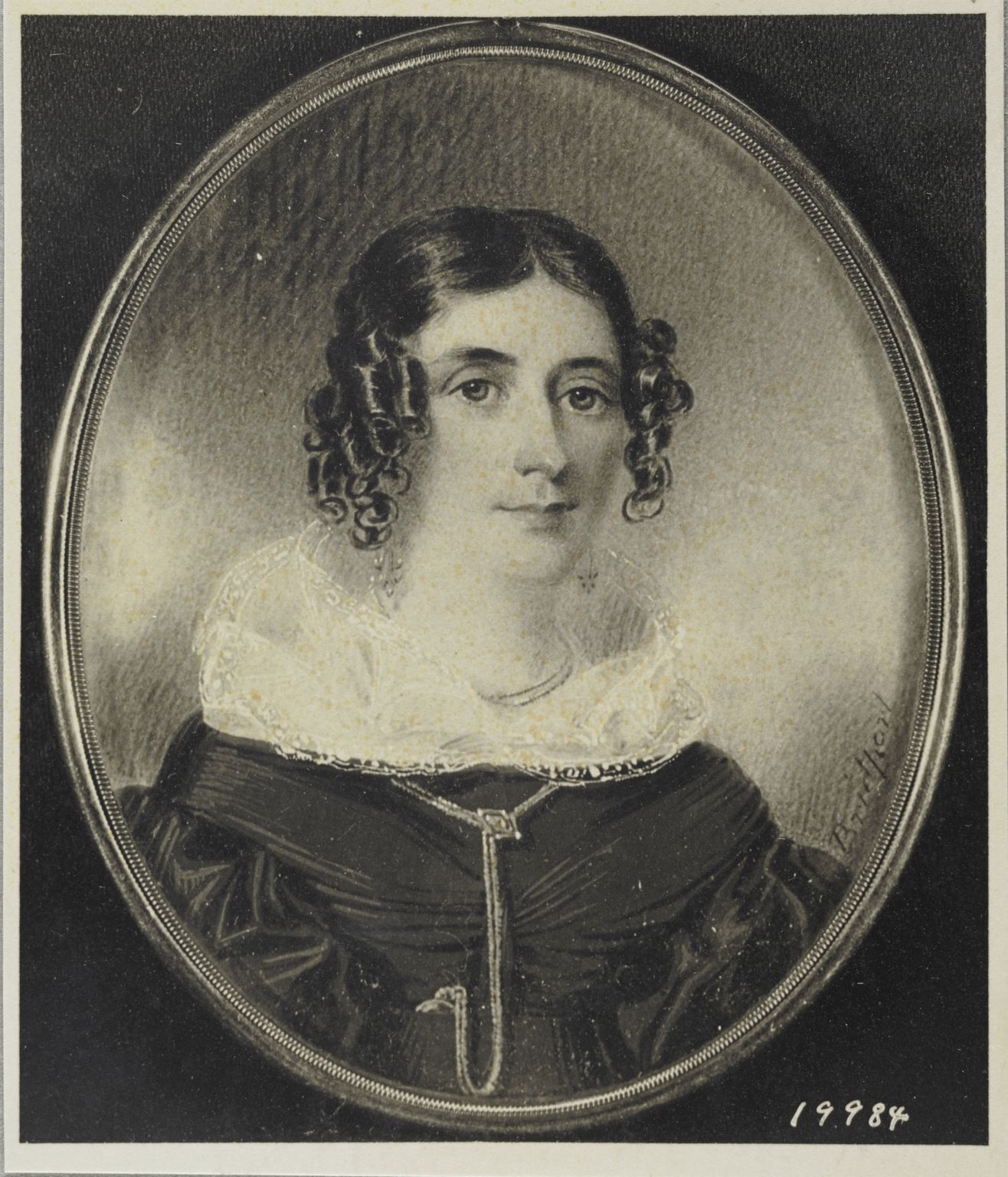
Rachel Broom

After the convention, Broom returned to Wilmington, where in 1795 he built a home near Brandywine Creek on the outskirts of the city. Broom's primary interest remained in local government. In addition to continuing his service in Wilmington's government, he became the city's first postmaster in 1790. For many years, he chaired the board of directors of Wilmington's Delaware Bank. He also operated a cotton mill, as well as a machine shop that produced and repaired mill machinery. In 1802 He sold his mill property, which became the center of the DuPont manufacturing empire. Broom was also involved in an unsuccessful scheme to mine bog iron ore. A further interest was internal improvements: toll roads, canals, and bridges. A letter to his son James in 1794 touches upon a number of these pursuits. Broom also found time for philanthropic and religious activities. His long-standing affiliation with the Old Academy led him to become involved in its reorganization into the College of Wilmington, and to serve on the college's first Board of Trustees. Broom was also deeply involved in his community's religious affairs as a lay leader of the Old Swedes Church.

== Death and legacy ==
He died at age 57 in 1810 while in Philadelphia on business and was buried there at Christ Church Burial Ground. A cenotaph was placed in his honor at the Christ Episcopal Church by the Delaware State Society in 1987. His home near the Brandywine, the Jacob Broom House, was declared a National Historic Landmark in 1974. Broom Street in Madison, Wisconsin, is named in his honor.
