= Montchanin, Delaware =

Unincorporated community in Delaware, United States

- Unincorporated community
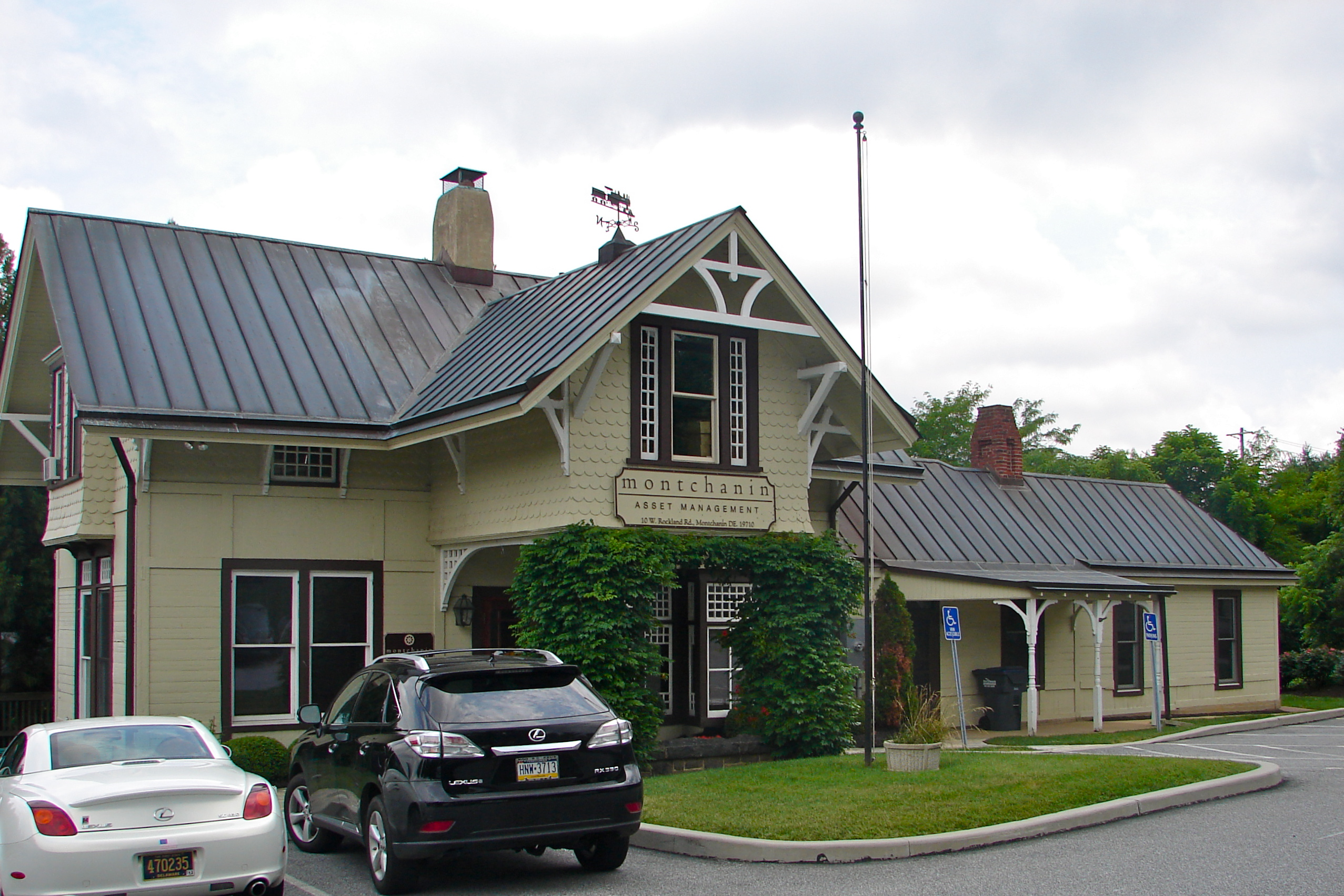
- Montchanin Station

- Location within the state of Delaware Montchanin, Delaware (the United States)
- Coordinates: 39°47′23″N 75°35′21″W
- Country: United States
- State: Delaware
- County: New Castle
- Elevation: 305 ft (93 m)
- Time zone: UTC-5 (Eastern (EST))
  - Summer (DST): UTC-4 (EDT)
- ZIP code: 19710
- Area code: 302
- GNIS feature ID: 214333

Montchanin is an unincorporated community in New Castle County, Delaware, United States. Montchanin is located at the intersection of Delaware Route 100 and Kirk Road to the northwest of Wilmington.

The community received a post office and permanent railroad station in 1889, at which time it acquired the name Montchanin in honor of Anne Alexandrine de Montchanin, mother of Pierre Samuel du Pont de Nemours. Prior to that time, the village rail stop was named DuPont Station in honor of the nearby duPont powder works.

The Jacob Broom House, a National Historic Landmark, is located there. The Jacob Broom House, Montchanin Historic District, and Strand Millas and Rock Spring are listed on the National Register of Historic Places.
