= Timeline of drafting and ratification of the United States Constitution =

The drafting of the Constitution of the United States began on May 25, 1787, when the Constitutional Convention met for the first time with a quorum at the Pennsylvania State House (now Independence Hall) in Philadelphia, Pennsylvania to revise the Articles of Confederation. It ended on September 17, 1787, the day the Frame of Government drafted by the convention's delegates to replace the Articles was adopted and signed. The ratification process for the Constitution began that day, and ended when the final state, Rhode Island, ratified it on May 29, 1790.

In addition to key events during the Constitutional Convention and afterward while the Constitution was put before the states for their ratification, this timeline includes important events that occurred during the run-up to the convention and during the nation's transition from government under the Articles of Confederation to government under the Constitution. It concludes with the unique ratification vote of the Vermont Republic, which at the time was a sovereign state outside the Union. The time span covered is 5 years, 9 months, from March 25, 1785 to January 10, 1791.

== 1785 ==
March 25 • Maryland–Virginia conference convenes

Initially scheduled to assemble in Alexandria, Virginia on March 21, delegates representing the states of Maryland and Virginia gather at Mount Vernon, the Fairfax County home of George Washington, to address navigational rights in the states' common waterways. Attending what later became known as the Mount Vernon Conference were: Daniel of St. Thomas Jenifer, Thomas Stone, and Samuel Chase, from Maryland; along with George Mason, and Alexander Henderson of Virginia.

March 28 • Maryland–Virginia conference concludes

Delegates approve a thirteen-point agreement, commonly known as the Mount Vernon Compact, regulating commerce, fishing, and navigation in the waters of the Potomac and Pocomoke Rivers, and Chesapeake Bay. The agreement was subsequently ratified by both the Virginia and Maryland General Assemblies, becoming the nation's first interstate compact.

== 1786 ==
January 21 • Conference to address certain defects of the federal government called

Virginia General Assembly calls for an interstate convention for the purpose of discussing and developing a consensus about reversing the protectionist trade and commerce barriers existing between the various states.

September 11 • Annapolis Convention convenes

Delegates representing Delaware, New Jersey, New York, Pennsylvania, and Virginia meet in Annapolis, Maryland to discuss ways to facilitate commerce between the states and establish standard rules and regulations. Appointed delegates from Massachusetts, New Hampshire, North Carolina, and Rhode Island either arrived too late to participate or otherwise did not attend. Four states: Connecticut, Georgia, Maryland and South Carolina, did not appoint delegates.

September 14 • Annapolis Convention adjourns

The convention report, sent to Congress and the legislatures of the various states, contains a request that another convention be held the following May at Philadelphia to discuss amending the Articles of Confederation.

November 23

New Jersey elects delegates to the proposed constitutional convention. David Brearley, Jonathan Dayton, William Houston, William Livingston, and William Paterson will attend.

December 4

Virginia elects delegates to the proposed constitutional convention. John Blair Jr., James Madison, George Mason, James McClurg, Edmund Randolph, George Washington, and George Wythe will attend.

December 30

Pennsylvania elects delegates to the proposed constitutional convention. George Clymer, Thomas FitzSimons, Benjamin Franklin, Jared Ingersoll, Thomas Mifflin, Gouverneur Morris, Robert Morris, and James Wilson will attend.

== 1787 ==
January 6

North Carolina elects delegates to the proposed constitutional convention. William Blount, William Richardson Davie, Alexander Martin, Richard Dobbs Spaight, and Hugh Williamson will attend.

January 17

New Hampshire elects delegates to the proposed Philadelphia Convention. Nicholas Gilman and John Langdon will attend.

February 3

Delaware elects delegates to the proposed constitutional convention. Richard Bassett, Gunning Bedford Jr., Jacob Broom, and John Dickinson, and George Read will attend.

February 10

Georgia elects delegates to the proposed constitutional convention. Abraham Baldwin, William Few, William Houstoun, and William Pierce will attend.

February 21 • Convention to discuss revisions to the Articles of Confederation called

The Congress of the Confederation calls a constitutional convention "for the sole and express purpose of revising the Articles of Confederation and reporting to Congress and the several legislatures such alterations and provisions therein and when agreed to in Congress and confirmed by the States render the Federal Constitution adequate to the exigencies of Government and the preservation of the Union".

March 3

Massachusetts elects delegates to the upcoming constitutional convention. Elbridge Gerry, Nathaniel Gorham, Rufus King, and Caleb Strong will attend.

March 6

New York elects delegates to the upcoming constitutional convention. Alexander Hamilton, John Lansing Jr., and Robert Yates will attend.

March 8

South Carolina elects delegates to the upcoming constitutional convention. Pierce Butler, Charles Cotesworth Pinckney, Charles Pinckney, and John Rutledge will attend.

April 23

Maryland elects delegates to the upcoming constitutional convention. Daniel Carroll, Daniel of St. Thomas Jenifer, Luther Martin, James McHenry, and John Mercer will attend.

May 5

A motion to send delegates to the constitutional convention fails in the Rhode Island General Assembly.

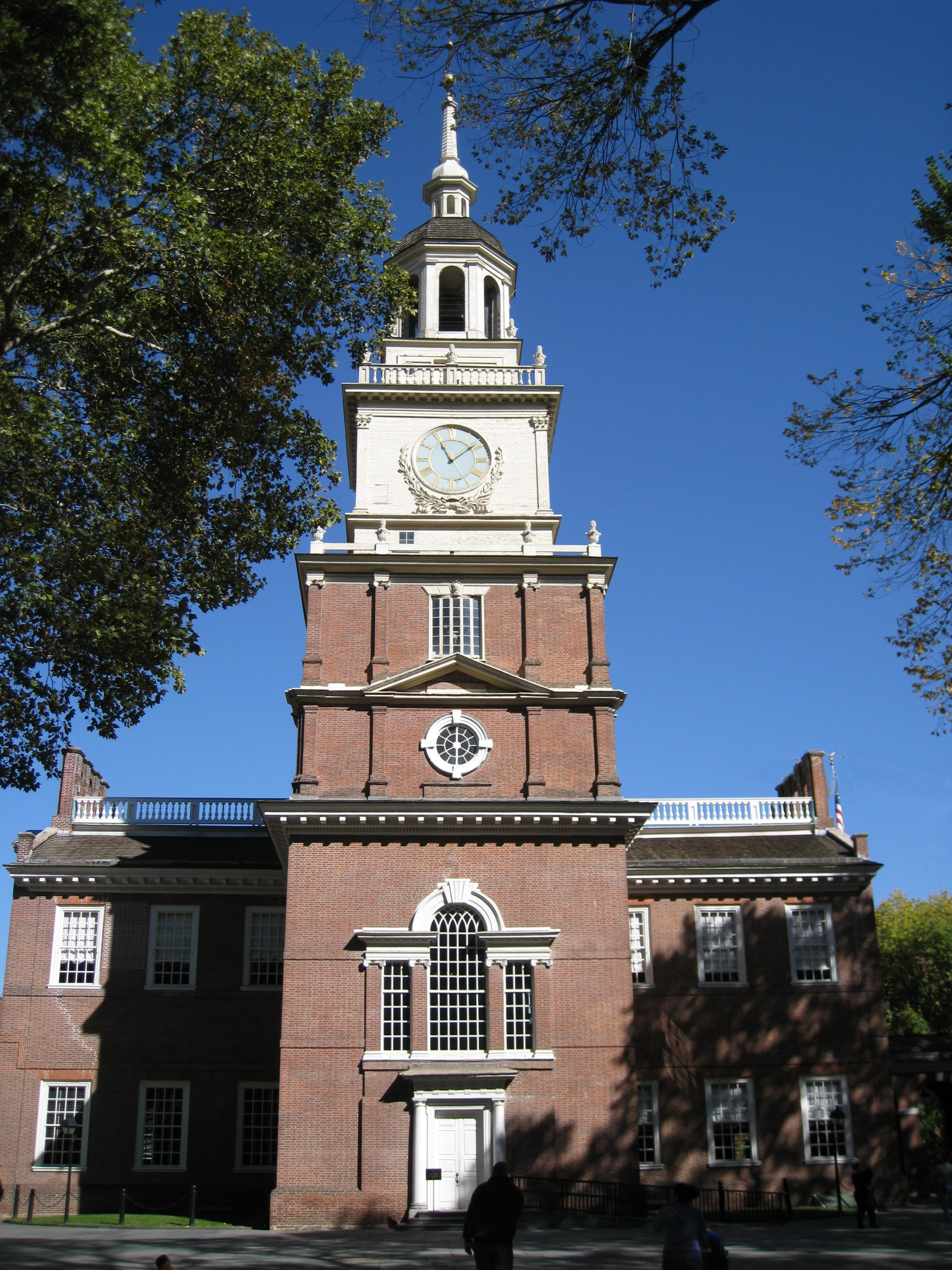
South facade of Independence Hall (formerly the Pennsylvania Statehouse), Philadelphia, where the Constitution was composed.

May 14 • Constitutional Convention scheduled to begin

As only a small number of delegates have arrived in Philadelphia, the convention's opening meeting is postponed for lack of a quorum.

May 14

Connecticut elects delegates to the constitutional convention. Oliver Ellsworth, William Samuel Johnson and Roger Sherman will attend.

May 17

A letter from "Certain Citizens of Rhode Island" is sent to the convention expressing their support for its work and their regret that not every state will be participating.

May 25 • Constitutional Convention convenes

As enough delegates have gathered at the Pennsylvania State House to constitute a quorum, the constitutional convention is called to order and delegates begin their work. George Washington is elected president of the convention. William Jackson is selected as the secretary to the convention. Alexander Hamilton, Charles Pinckney and George Wythe are chosen to prepare rules for the convention.

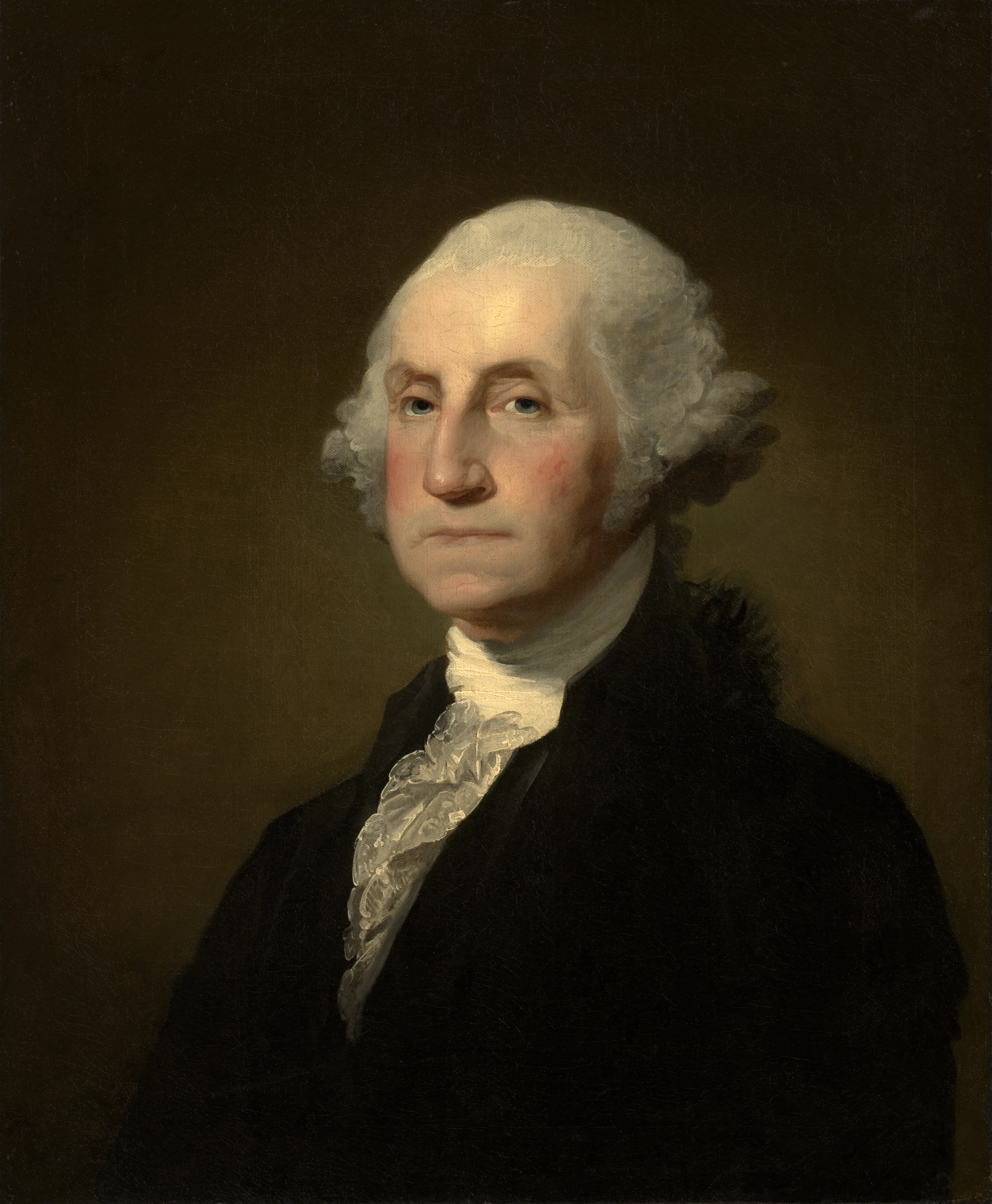
George Washington, who served as president of the 1787 Constitutional Convention

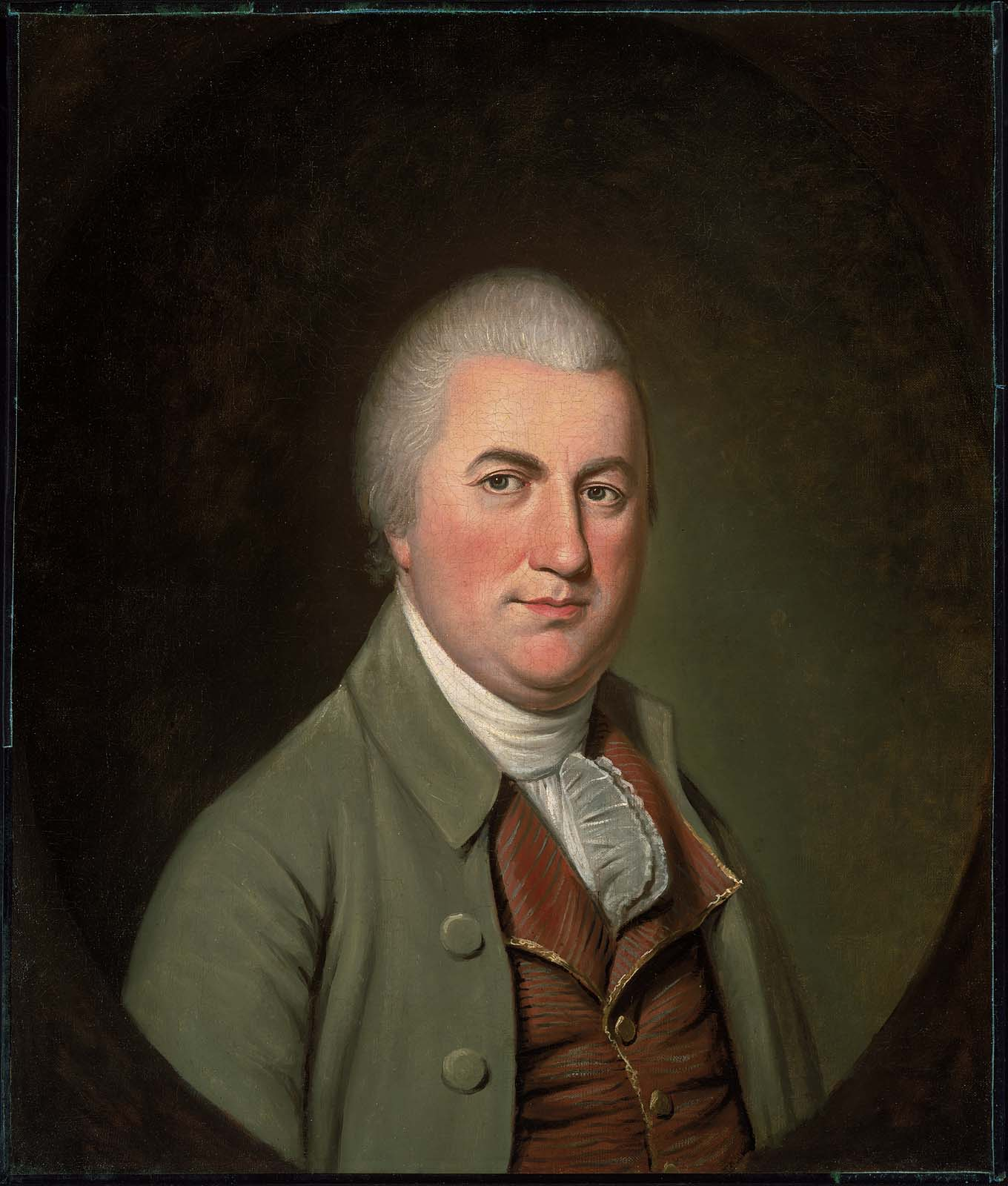
Nathaniel Gorham, who served as chairman when delegates met as a Committee of the Whole

May 29

Virginia Plan (also known as the Large State Plan or the Randolph Plan) for structuring the federal government is presented by Edmund Randolph.

May 29

Pinckney Plan for structuring the federal government is presented by Charles Pinckney.

May 30

Nathaniel Gorham is elected to serve as chairman of the Committee of the Whole.

June 11

Roger Sherman introduces the Connecticut Compromise (also known as the Sherman or Great Compromise) which calls for proportional representation (population-based) in the House of Representatives and equal representation for each state in the Senate. The plan would be referred to committee on July 2 and come up for a vote on July 16.

June 15

New Jersey Plan (also known as the Small State Plan or the Paterson Plan) for structuring the federal government is presented by William Paterson.

June 18

Hamilton Plan (also known as the British Plan) for structuring the federal government is presented by Alexander Hamilton.

July 2

Committee of Eleven, composed of Abraham Baldwin, Gunning Bedford, William Davie, Oliver Ellsworth, Benjamin Franklin, Elbridge Gerry, Luther Martin, George Mason, John Rutledge, William Patterson, and Robert Yates, is selected to work out a compromise on the issue of representation in the two houses of the federal legislature. Committees like this one, which included one delegate from each state represented, were established on several occasions during the convention in order to secure a breakthrough so that the deliberative process could move forward in a productive fashion.

July 12

Delegates from slave states and those from free states adopt the Three-Fifths Compromise concerning how slaves would be counted when apportioning representatives and direct taxes.

July 16

Committee of Eleven report calls for the adoption of the Connecticut Compromise introduced by Roger Sherman on June 11. The compromise allowed proportional representation for seats in the House and equal representation for states in the Senate. The plan, which also proposed that all money bills originate in the House, is approved by the convention (5–4–1).

July 24

Committee of Detail, composed of John Rutledge, Edmund Randolph, Nathaniel Gorham, Oliver Ellsworth, and James Wilson, is selected to write a first draft constitution reflective of the Resolutions passed by the convention up to that point.

August 6

Committee of Detail report, proposing a twenty-three article (plus preamble) constitution is presented.

August 18

Committee of Eleven composed of Abraham Baldwin, George Clymer, John Dickinson, Rufus King, John Langdon, William Livingston, George Mason, James McHenry, Charles C. Pinkney, Roger Sherman, and Hugh Williamson, is selected to address issues related to Federal assumption of state debts. Issues related to the militia are referred to this committee on August 20.

August 22

Committee of Eleven composed of Abraham Baldwin, George Clymer, John Dickinson, William Johnson, Rufus King, John Langdon, William Livingston, Luther Martin, James Madison, Charles C. Pinkney, and Hugh Williamson, is selected to address issues related to federal tax and duty levying powers and also its power to regulate or prohibit the migration or importation of slaves.

August 25

Committee of Eleven composed of Pierce Butler, Daniel Carrol, Jonathan Dayton, William Few, Thomas FitzSimons, Nathaniel Gorham, John Langdon, George Mason, George Read, Roger Sherman, and Hugh Williamson, is selected to consider issues related to interstate trade and navigation.

August 31

Committee of Eleven (Leftover Business) composed of Abraham Baldwin, David Brearly, Pierce Butler, Daniel Carrol, John Dickinson, Nicholas Gilman, Rufus King, James Madison, Gouvernour Morris, Roger Sherman, and Hugh Williamson, is selected to settle "such parts of the Constitution as have been postponed, and such parts of Reports as have not been acted on".

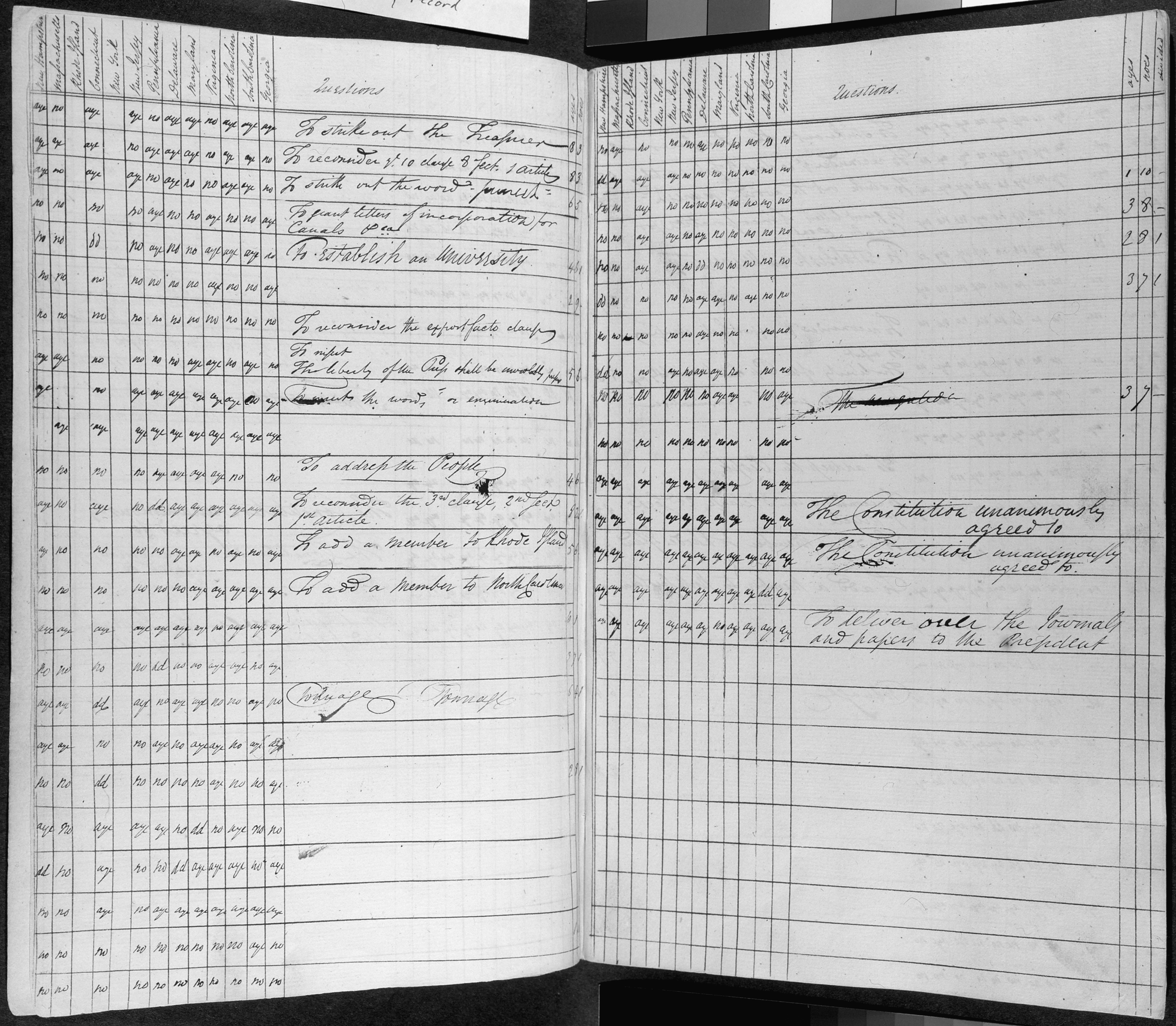
The convention voting record, which reflects the mutual concessions and compromises that produced the Constitution; this page records the final vote taken September 15, 1787

September 1–8

Committee of Eleven (Leftover Business) addresses several outstanding issues—including the method of choosing a president, the length of a presidential term of office, the president's treaty making power, and the impeachment of the president—and makes a series of reports.

September 8

Committee of Style and Arrangement, composed of Alexander Hamilton, William Johnson, Rufus King, James Madison, and Gouverneur Morris, is selected to distill a final draft constitution from the twenty-three approved articles.

September 12

Committee of Style and Arrangement presents the completed final draft of the Constitution to the convention for its consideration. The twenty-three articles have been reorganized into a cohesive document containing seven articles, a preamble and a closing endorsement, of which Gouverneur Morris was the primary author. The committee also presented a proposed letter to accompany the constitution when delivered to Congress.

September 13–14

The official copy of the draft Constitution is engrossed by Jacob Shallus.

September 15

The draft Constitution receives the unanimous approval of the state delegations.

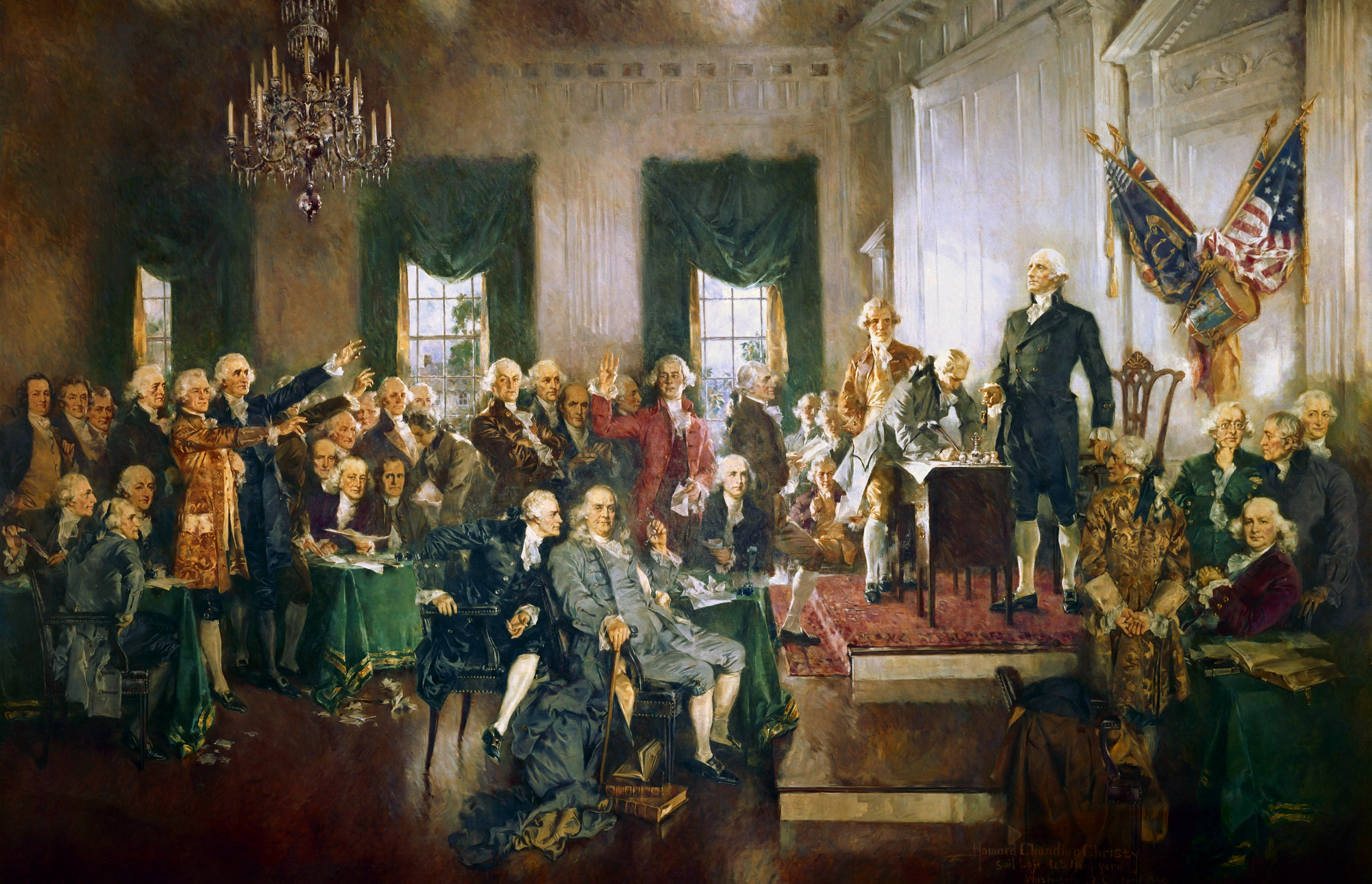
Howard Chandler Christy's 1940 Scene at the Signing of the Constitution of the United States

September 17 • Constitution signed and convention adjourns

The approved Constitution is signed by thirty-nine delegates from twelve states (all but Rhode Island). One delegate, John Dickinson, who was ill and not present, had George Read sign his name by proxy. Three delegates present declined to sign the document: Edmund Randolph, George Mason, and Elbridge Gerry. George Washington, as president of the convention, signed first. The other delegates then signed, grouped by state in strict congressional voting order. Washington, however, signed near the right margin, and so when the delegates ran out of space beneath his signature, they began a second column of signatures to the left. Jackson, the convention secretary, also signed as a witness. The convention then adjourned sine die.

September 18 • Proposed Constitution published

The Pennsylvania Packet prints the first public copies of the proposed Constitution in Philadelphia.

September 20

Proposed Constitution is received by Congress.

September 27

First Anti-Federalist letter by "Cato" is published.

September 28

Congress of the Confederation votes to transmit the proposed Constitution to the thirteen states for ratification by the people in state conventions, as prescribed In its Article Seven.

October 5

First Anti-Federalist letter by "Centinel" is published.

October 8

First Anti-Federalist letter by "Federal Farmer" is published.

October 18

First Anti-Federalist letter by "Brutus" is published.

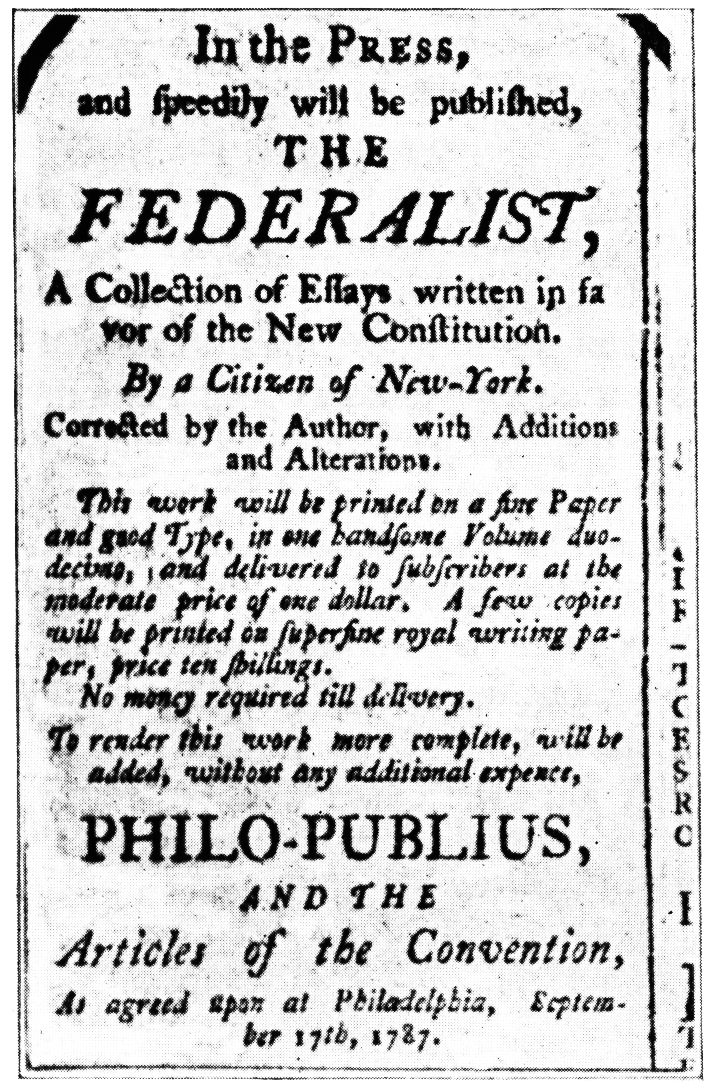
An advertisement for The Federalist, 1787, using the pseudonym "Philo-Publius"

October 27

First of The Federalist Papers by "Publius" (Alexander Hamilton, John Jay, and James Madison), Hamilton's Federalist No. 1, is published in The Independent Journal. The planned series of essays would, the authors hoped, "give a satisfactory answer to all the [Anti-Federalist] objections which shall have made their appearance, that may seem to have any claim to your attention."

November 20

Ratifying convention begins in Pennsylvania.

December 3

Ratifying convention begins in Delaware.

December 7 • Ratification by Delaware

Delaware becomes the first state to ratify the Constitution (30–0).

December 11

Ratifying convention begins in New Jersey.

December 12 • Ratification by Pennsylvania

Pennsylvania becomes the second state to ratify the Constitution (46–23).

December 18 • Ratification by New Jersey

New Jersey becomes the third state to ratify the Constitution (38–0).

December 18

Pennsylvania convention Anti-Federalist minority publishes their "Dissent".

December 25

Ratifying convention begins in Georgia.

== 1788 ==
January 2 • Ratification by Georgia

Georgia becomes the fourth state to ratify the Constitution (26–0).

January 3

Ratifying convention begins in Connecticut.

January 9 • Ratification by Connecticut

Connecticut becomes the fifth state to ratify the Constitution (128–40).

January 9

Ratifying convention begins in Massachusetts.

February 6 • Ratification by Massachusetts

Massachusetts becomes the sixth state to ratify the Constitution (187–168). In addition to ratifying the constitution, Massachusetts requests that nineteen alterations be made to it.

February 13–22

Ratifying convention (first session) held in New Hampshire.

March 1

Flouting the letter and spirit of Article Seven of the proposed Constitution, the Rhode Island General Assembly calls for a statewide referendum rather than a state convention.

March 24

Voters in Rhode Island overwhelmingly reject the Constitution (2,708–237).

April 10

Albany Antifederal Committee publishes a circular forcefully objecting to the proposed constitution, calling the frame of government "more arbitrary and despotic than that of Great Britain."

April 21

Ratifying convention begins in Maryland.

April 28 • Ratification by Maryland

Maryland becomes the seventh state to ratify the Constitution (63–11).

May 12

Ratifying convention begins in South Carolina.

May 23 • Ratification by South Carolina

South Carolina becomes the eighth state to ratify the Constitution (149–73). In addition to ratifying the constitution, South Carolina requests that two alterations be made to it.

June 2

Ratifying convention begins in Virginia.

June 17

Ratifying convention begins in New York.

June 18

Ratifying convention (second session) begins in New Hampshire.

June 21 • Ratification by New Hampshire

New Hampshire becomes the ninth state to ratify the Constitution (57–47). In addition to ratifying the constitution, New Hampshire requests that twelve alterations be made to it.

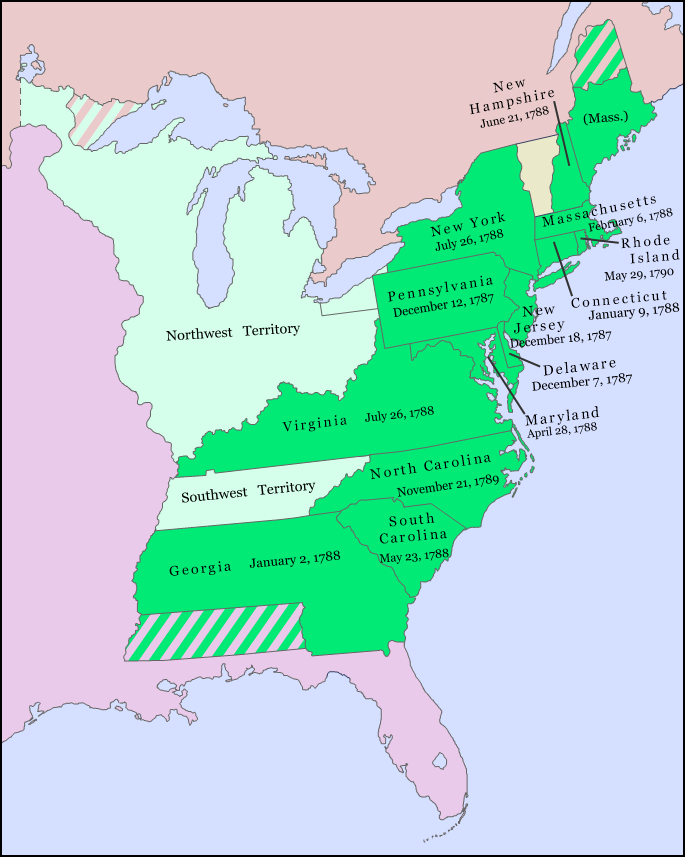
Dates the 13 states ratified the Constitution

June 21

Having been ratified by nine of the thirteen states, the Constitution is officially established, and takes effect for those nine states.

June 25 • Ratification by Virginia

Virginia becomes the tenth state to ratify the Constitution (89–79). In addition to ratifying the constitution, Virginia requests that 20 alterations be made to it.

July 2

Congress President Cyrus Griffin informs Congress that New Hampshire has ratified the Constitution and notes that this is the ninth ratification transmitted to them. A committee is formed to examine all ratifications received thus far and to develop a plan for putting the new Constitution into operation.

July 21 – August 2

First ratifying convention held in Hillsborough, North Carolina. With the hope of effecting the incorporation of a bill of rights into the frame of government, delegates vote (184–84) neither to ratify nor to reject the Constitution.

July 26 • Ratification by New York

New York becomes the eleventh state to ratify the Constitution (30–27). In addition to ratifying the constitution, New York issues a circular letter requesting that 33 alterations be made to it, and also that the new United States Congress take positive action on all amendments demanded by other state ratifying conventions.

September 13

Congress of the Confederation certifies that the new constitution has been duly ratified and sets date for first meeting of the new federal government and the presidential election.

December 15, 1788 – January 10, 1789 • Presidential election held

First quadrennial presidential election under the new Constitution is held.

== 1789 ==
February 4 • Electoral College convenes

Presidential electors meet to cast their votes in their respective states. George Washington is unanimously elected to be the nation's first president and John Adams is elected its first vice president, receiving 34 of 69 votes cast. Only ten of the thirteen states cast electoral votes in this election. North Carolina and Rhode Island were ineligible to participate as they had not yet ratified the Constitution. The New York legislature failed to appoint its allotted electors in time, so there were no voting electors from New York.

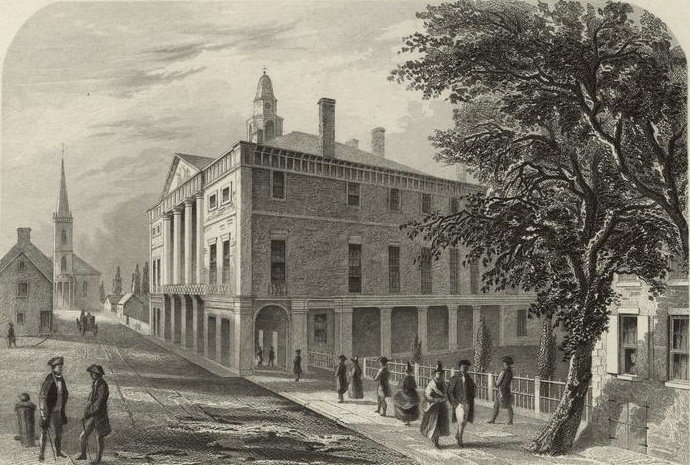
Federal Hall, New York City, first seat of government of the United States under the Constitution

March 4 • United States Congress convenes

The federal government begins operations under the new form of government as members of the 1st United States Congress are seated at Federal Hall in New York City. The Senate of eleven states would include 20 Federalists and two Anti-federalists (both from Virginia). The House would seat 48 Federalists and 11 Anti-federalists (from four states: Massachusetts, New York, South Carolina, and Virginia). However, the initial meeting of each chamber must be adjourned due to lack of a quorum.

April 1 • House of Representatives achieves its first quorum

With a quorum being present representatives begin their work. Frederick Muhlenberg of Pennsylvania is elected Speaker of the House.

April 6 • Senate achieves its first quorum

With a quorum being present senators begin their work. John Langdon of New Hampshire is elected President pro tempore of the Senate.

April 6 • Electoral votes counted

The House and Senate, meeting in joint session, certify that George Washington has been elected President of the United States and John Adams elected as Vice President.

April 21 • John Adams assumes vice presidential duties

John Adams is sworn in as Vice President of the United States in the Senate chamber at Federal Hall in New York City.

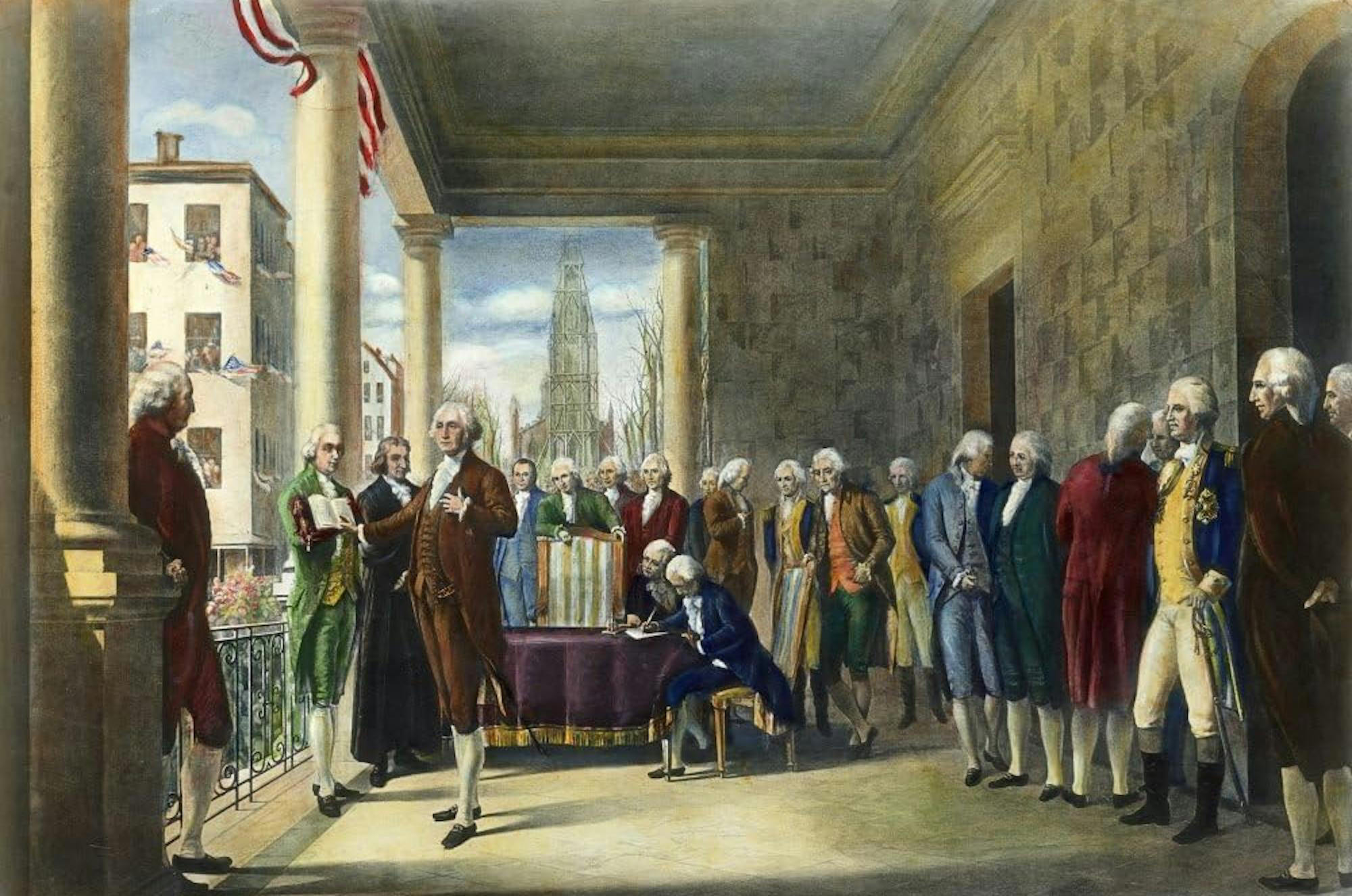
George Washington's inauguration as the first President of the United States, April 30, 1789

April 30 • George Washington assumes presidential duties

George Washington inaugurated as President of the United States at Federal Hall in New York City. Washington placed his hand upon a Bible belonging to the St. John's Lodge No. 1, A.Y.M. as Chancellor of New York Robert Livingston administered the presidential oath of office.

September 25 • Constitutional amendments proposed by Congress

Twelve articles of amendment to the Constitution are approved by the Senate, having been passed by the House on the preceding day, both without recorded vote, and sent to the states for ratification. Articles Three through Twelve were ratified as additions to the Constitution December 15, 1791, and are collectively known as the Bill of Rights. Article Two became part of the Constitution May 7, 1992 as the Twenty-seventh Amendment. Article One is technically still pending before the states.

November 16

Second ratifying convention begins in Fayetteville, North Carolina.

November 21 • Ratification by North Carolina

North Carolina becomes the twelfth state to ratify the Constitution (194–77). In addition to ratifying the constitution, North Carolina requests that twenty-six alterations be made to it.

== 1790 ==
February 2 • Supreme Court of the United States convenes

The Supreme Court of the United States holds its inaugural session with a quorum present at the Royal Exchange Building on Broad Street in New York City, with Chief Justice John Jay presiding. As set by the Judiciary Act of 1789, the Supreme Court would initially consist of a chief justice and five associate justices.

March 1–6

Ratifying convention (first session) held in Rhode Island.

May 24

Ratifying convention (second session) begins in Rhode Island.

May 29 • Ratification by Rhode Island

Rhode Island becomes the last of the thirteen states to ratify the Constitution (34–32). In addition to ratifying the constitution, Rhode Island requests that twenty-one alterations be made to it.

== 1791 ==
January 6

Convention to consider joining the United States begins in Vermont.

January 10 • Ratification and application by Vermont

Vermont votes to ratify the Constitution and to apply for admission to the Union (105–2).

== Gallery ==
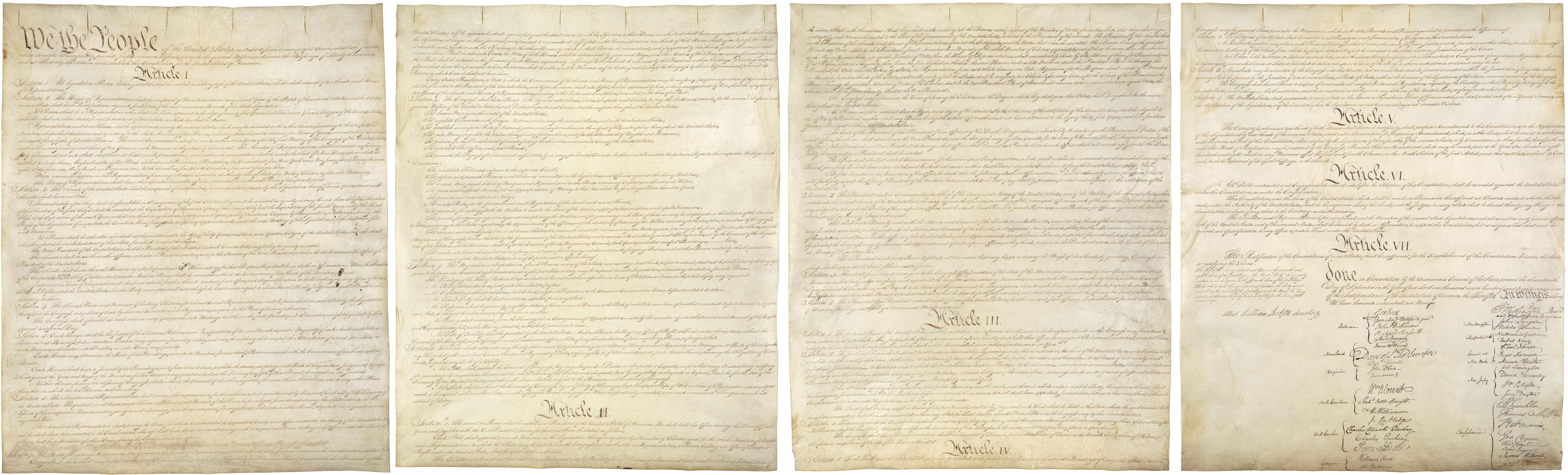
Original parchment pages of the United States Constitution

== See also ==
- Confederation Period
- Federal Procession of 1788
- Founding Fathers of the United States
- History of the United States (1776–1789)
- Republicanism in the United States
- Notes of Debates in the Federal Convention of 1787

== Bibliography ==
- Elliot, Jonathan (1836a). Elliot's Debates. Vol. One (2nd ed.). Washington D.C.: Published under the sanction of Congress. LCCN 17007172.
- —— (1836c). Elliot's Debates. Vol. Three (2nd ed.). Washington D.C.: Published under the sanction of Congress. LCCN 17007172.
- —— (1836d). Elliot's Debates. Vol. Four (2nd ed.). Washington D.C.: Published under the sanction of Congress. LCCN 17007172.
- Ferling, John (2003). A Leap in the Dark: The Struggle to Create the American Republic. New York, New York: Oxford University Press. ISBN 978-0-19-515924-0.
- Gunn, Giles B., ed. (1994). Early American Writing. New York, New York: Penguin Group. ISBN 978-0-14-039087-2.
- Kilpatrick, James J., ed. (1961). The Constitution of the United States and Amendments Thereto. Richmond, Virginia: Virginia Commission on Constitutional Government.
- Labunski, Richard (2006). James Madison and the Struggle for the Bill of Rights. New York, New York: Oxford University Press. ISBN 978-0-19-518105-0.
- Madison, James (1787). "Notes of Debates in the Federal Convention of 1787". New Haven, Connecticut: Avalon Project, Yale Law School Lillian Goldman Law Library – via The Debates in the Federal Convention of 1787, which framed the Constitution of the United States of America, reported by James Madison, a delegate from the state of Virginia. Hund, Gaillard; Scott, James Brown, eds. Oxford University Press, 1920.
- Maier, Pauline (2010). Ratification: The People Debate the Constitution, 1787–1788. New York, New York: Simon & Schuster. ISBN 978-0-684-86854-7.
- Millican, Edward (1990). One United People: The Federalist Papers and the National Idea. Lexington, Kentucky: University Press of Kentucky. ISBN 978-08131-6033-7.
- Scharf, J. Thomas (1888). History of Delaware 1609–1888. Vol. One. Philadelphia, Pennsylvania: L. J. Richards and Company.
- Smith, Page (1962). John Adams. Vol. Two 1784–1826. Garden City, New York: Doubleday.
- Vile, John R. (2005). The Constitutional Convention of 1787: A Comprehensive Encyclopedia of America's Founding. Vol. 1: A-M. Santa Barbara, California: ABC-CLIO. ISBN 978-1-85109-669-5.
- Warren, Charles (1928). The Making of the Constitution. Boston: Little, Brown, and Company.
- Wright, Robert K. Jr.; MacGregor, Morris J. Jr. (1987). "Appendix A: The Annapolis Convention". Soldier-Statesmen of the Constitution. Washington, D.C.: U.S. Army Center of Military History. ISBN 978-0-16-035959-0. CMH Pub 71-25.
- Yates, Robert (1821). Secret Proceedings and Debates of the Convention Assembled at Philadelphia, in the Year 1787: For the Purpose of Forming the United States of America. Albany: Websters and Skinners.
