= 1789 New Hampshire gubernatorial election =

- March 10, 1789
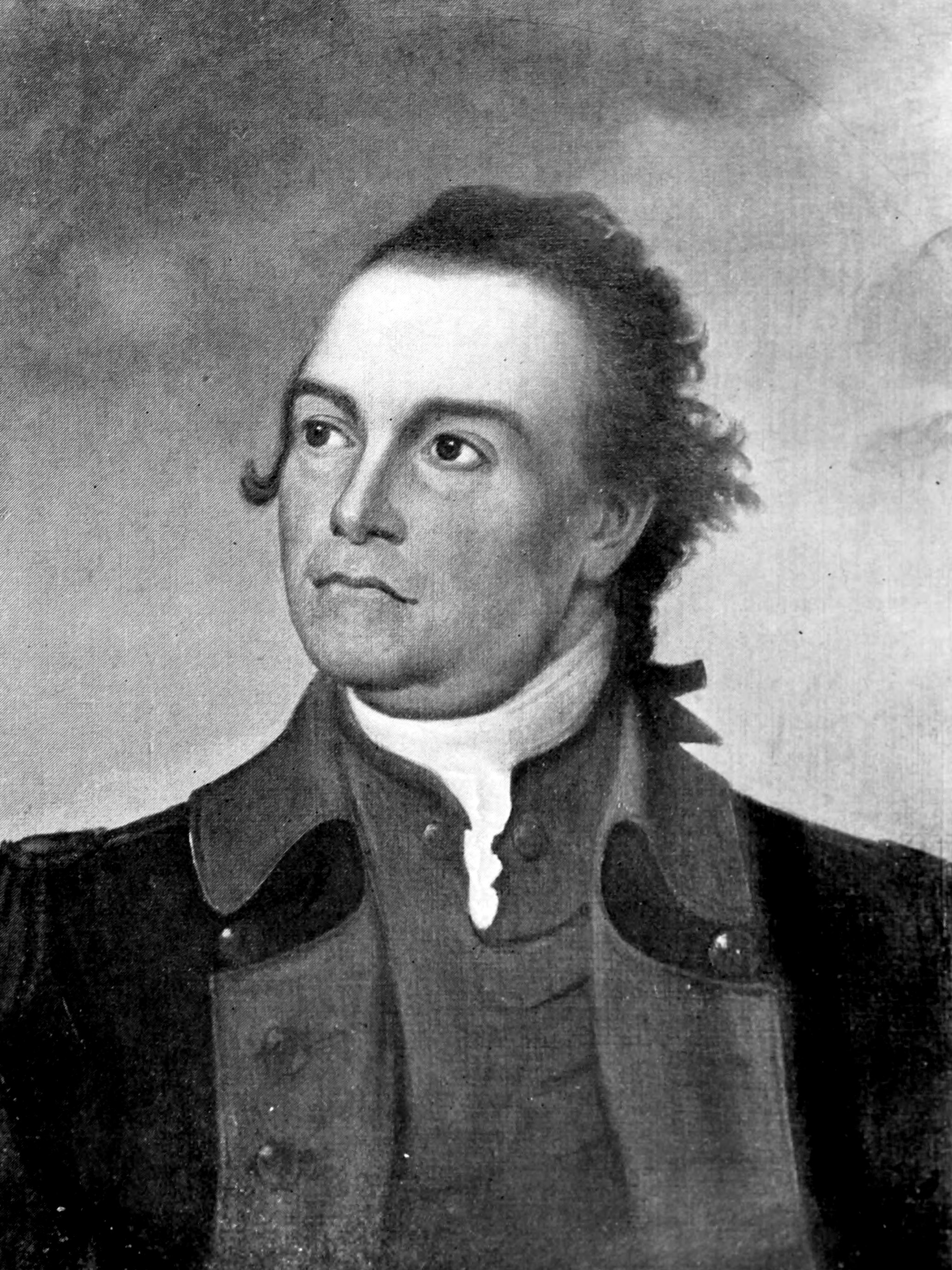

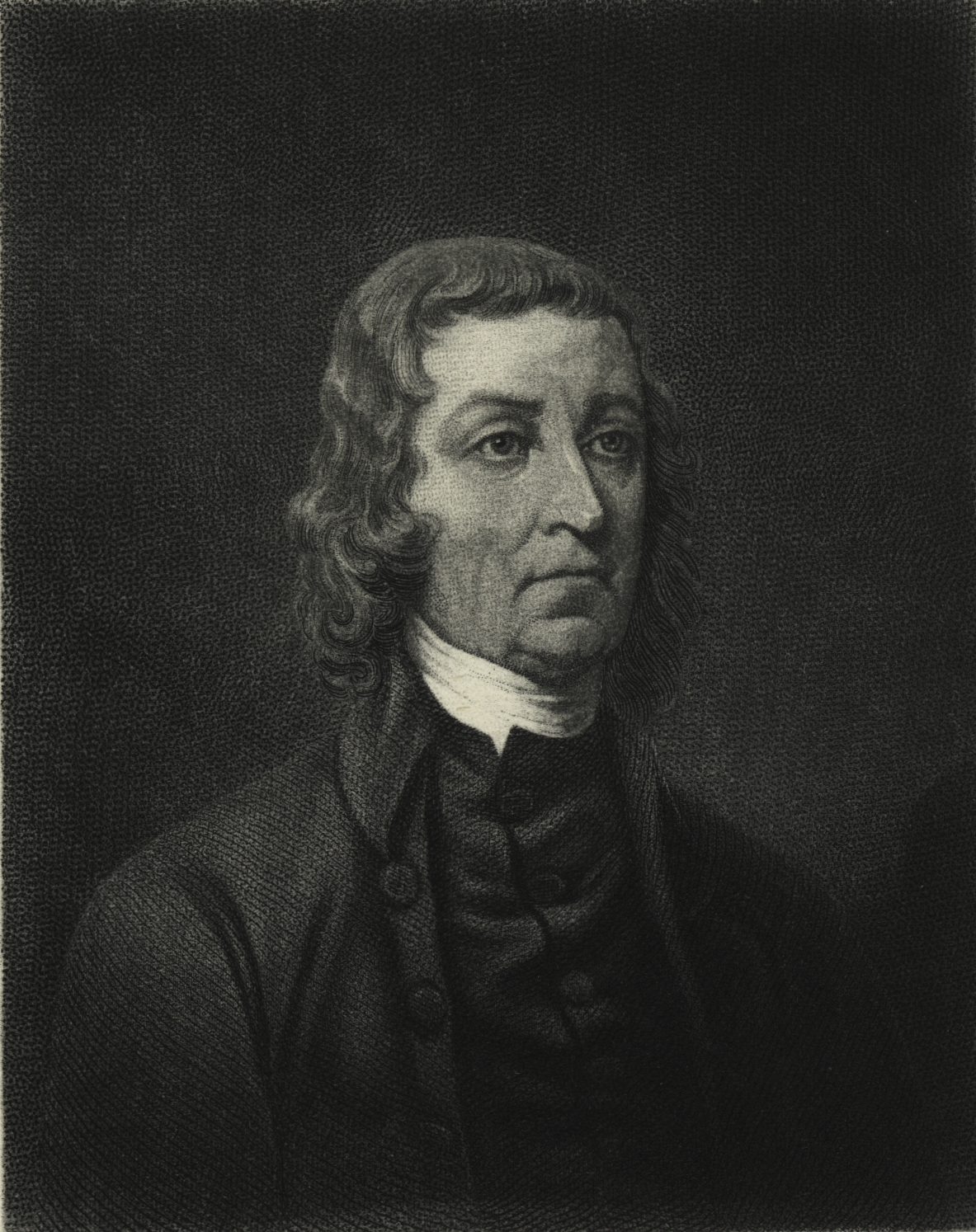
| Nominee | John Sullivan | John Pickering | Josiah Bartlett |
| Party | Federalist | | Anti-Federalist |
| Popular vote | 3,657 | 3,488 | 968 |
| Percentage | 42.85% | 40.87% | 11.34% |
President before election
John Pickering (Acting)
Elected President
John Sullivan
Federalist

The 1789 New Hampshire gubernatorial election was held on March 10, 1789, in order to elect the President of New Hampshire. (The office would be renamed to Governor in 1792.) Federalist candidate and former President John Sullivan defeated incumbent Acting President John Pickering and 1785 & 1787 President Anti-Federalist candidate Josiah Bartlett. Since no candidate received a majority in the popular vote, Sullivan was elected by the New Hampshire General Court per the state constitution.

== General election ==
On election day, March 10, 1789, Federalist candidate and former President John Sullivan won the popular vote by a margin of 169 votes against his foremost opponent and incumbent Acting President John Pickering. But because no candidate received a majority of the popular vote, a separate election was held by the New Hampshire General Court, which chose Sullivan as the winner. He thereby gained Federalist control over the office of President. Sullivan was sworn in for his third term on June 6, 1789.

=== Results ===
New Hampshire gubernatorial election, 1789
| Party | Candidate | Votes | % |
|---|---|---|---|
| Federalist | John Sullivan | 3,657 | 42.85 |
| | John Pickering (incumbent) | 3,488 | 40.87 |
| Anti-Federalist | Josiah Bartlett | 968 | 11.34 |
| | Scattering | 421 | 4.94 |
| Total votes | | 8,534 | 100.00 |
| Federalist gain from Anti-Federalist | | | |
