= New York Circular Letter =

1788 compromise in American politics

The New York Circular Letter was a solution reached in a controversy between Federalists and Anti-Federalists over ratification of the United States Constitution. The compromise built on earlier deals like the Massachusetts Compromise to call for the use of the Convention provision written into the newly ratified Constitution in order to get the amendments demanded by New York and other states.

Melancton Smith led the Anti-Federalists at the New York Ratifying Convention in Poughkeepsie. John Jay and Alexander Hamilton were among the leaders of the Federalists. A majority of the Convention were Anti-Federalists. But after New Hampshire and Virginia ratified the Constitution, many felt it was no longer practical to insist on amendments before ratifying. With 10 other States having ratified, the Constitution was clearly going into effect, the debate was whether or not New York would be a part of it.

Smith proposed that the States call for a Convention under Article V as a condition of New York's ratification, but Jay and Hamilton altered the proposal to ratification unconditionally, but with the understanding that the Article V Convention procedure would be used. The delegates assigned both Smith and Jay to the committee to draft the letter, though ultimately the draft adopted by the New York Convention was written by John Jay with help from Hamilton and John Lansing Jr.

The Convention adopted the letter unanimously. Governor of New York and Chair of the Convention George Clinton sent the letter to all of the States and championed the proposal in the New York State Legislature to call for the Convention. Virginia and New York were the only two states to call for the Convention. The response in other states varied from outright rejection to consideration only after giving Congress a chance to propose the amendments first.

James Madison opposed the idea of early amendments, advocating a few years of seeing how the Constitution would run first. However, he believed that if amendments were to be proposed early, especially if some of them went to the heart of the function of Congress before Congress had a chance to demonstrate how well it would work, it would be better if they were proposed by Congress. Madison, a member of the first United States House of Representatives, proposed the Bill of Rights partially in response to the Convention effort.
