= Thomas Greenleaf =

American publisher

Thomas Greenleaf (1755–1798) was an American publisher during the 18th-century who published Anti-Federalist letters including those by the Federal Farmer in the New York Journal. He also published the laws of the state of New York.
