= Federal Farmer =

Pseudonym of an Anti-Federalist opposed to the ratification of the Constitution

The Federal Farmer was the pseudonym used by an Anti-Federalist who wrote a methodical assessment of the proposed United States Constitution that was among the more important documents of the ratification debate. The assessment appeared in the form of two pamphlets, the first published in November 1787 and the second in December 1787.

The letters, which were addressed to "The Republican," were signed only with the pseudonym "the Federal Farmer." The identity of the author is subject to debate. Scholars have suggested Richard Henry Lee and Melancton Smith as possibilities, though recent evidence suggests Elbridge Gerry is the most likely author. While the Smith attribution is supportable, John Kaminski's attribution of Elbridge Gerry is more compelling and increasingly authoritative. "The Republican" was most likely New York governor George Clinton.

The Federal Farmer made typical Anti-Federalist arguments, claiming that the Constitution would tear down the sovereign states in favor of a consolidated government, and that this end of the federal system would be destructive of American liberties. The letters were praised at the time for their thoughtfulness, composition, and persuasiveness, and today are among the most widely read works in the Anti-Federalist canon.

== Publication and contemporary reaction ==
On November 8, 1787, the New York Journal began to advertise a new pamphlet entitled Observations Leading to a Fair Examination of the System of Government Proposed by the Late Convention; and to Several Essential and Necessary Alterations in It. In a Number of Letters from the Federal Farmer to the Republican. This pamphlet contained the first five Federal Farmer letters, dated October 8 to 13. The first edition was replete with errors and a second, corrected printing appeared within a week. The letters also began to appear in newspapers; on November 14 the Poughkeepsie County Journal started publishing the series, finishing on January 2. The first two editions of the pamphlet were probably produced by Thomas Greenleaf, who printed the New York Journal. At least two further editions were released by other printers.

Through January, the Federal Farmer letters circulated through New York, Connecticut, Massachusetts, and Pennsylvania. Following on the success of the first pamphlet, a second one containing thirteen new letters, dated from December 25 to January 25, appeared in early May. Also printed by Thomas Greenleaf, this pamphlet, entitled An Additional Number of Letters From the Federal Farmer to the Republican Leading to a Fair Examination of the System of Government Proposed by the Late Convention; To Several Essential and Necessary Alterations in It; And Calculated to Illustrate and Support the Principles and Positions Laid Down in the Preceding Letters, was first advertised in the Journal on May 2. The Additional Letters had significantly less success than the Observations.

Among the Federalists, Alexander Hamilton (as Publius), Edward Carrington, and Noah Webster acknowledged the Federal Farmer as, in Hamilton's words, the "most plausible" Anti-Federalist. Only one Federalist, Timothy Pickering, took the time to develop a complete critical response to the Federal Farmer. Though this was not published during the course of the constitutional debates, it survives in a personal letter. Pickering described the Federal Farmer as "a wolfe in sheep's cloathing" and too focused on a misplaced fear of aristocracy.

== Attribution ==
=== Richard Henry Lee ===
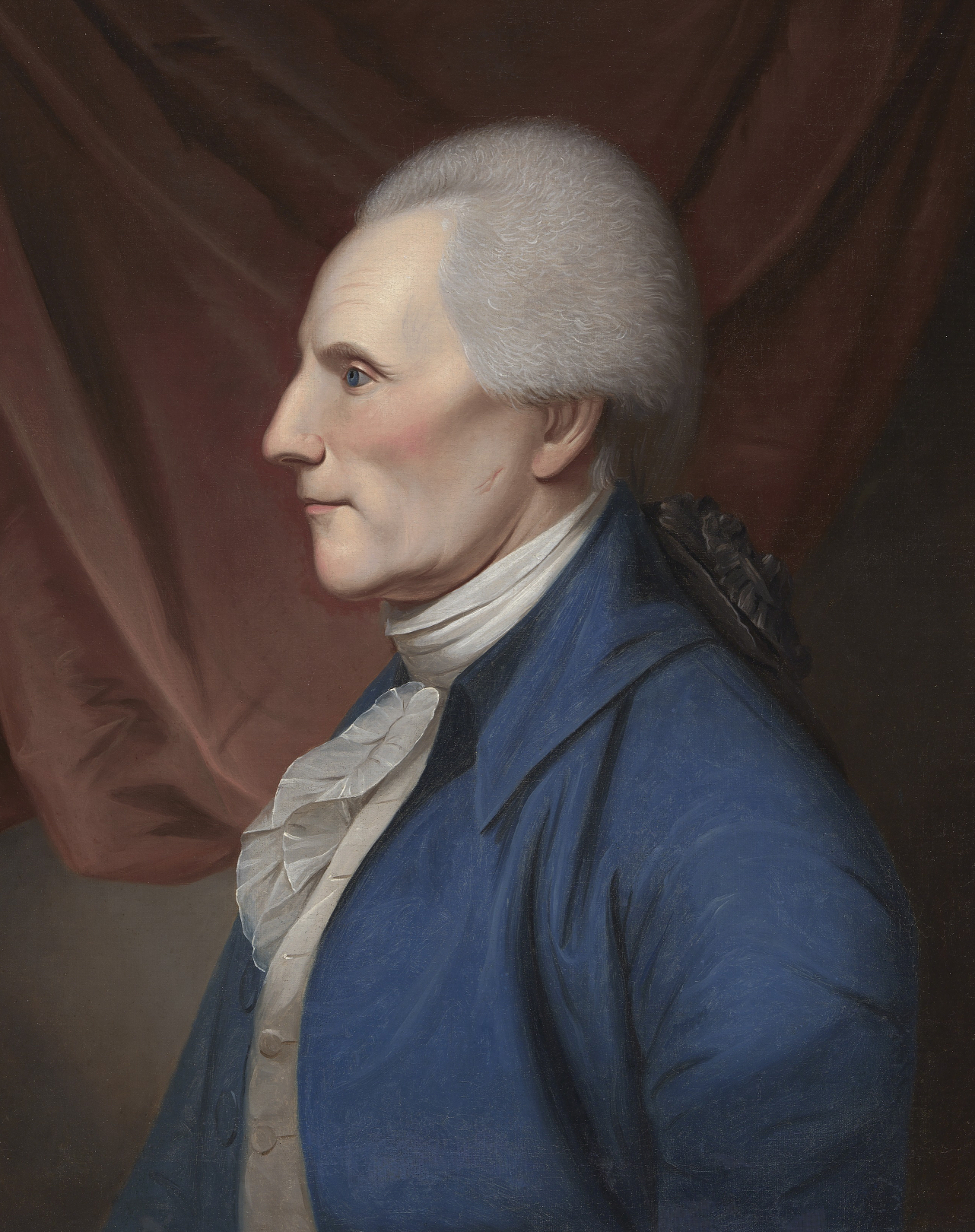
Portrait of Lee

The authorship of the Federal Farmer letters is uncertain. Until the latter part of the 20th century, the letters were generally accepted to be the work of Richard Henry Lee. Lee had been a member of the Continental Congress and had served as that body's presiding officer. He was known to be an Anti-Federalist, and as he was at New York in 1787 while serving on Virginia's Congressional delegation, he could have arranged for the initial publication of the pamphlets. A handful of contemporary sources identified Lee with the Federal Farmer pamphlets, beginning with a letter addressed to Lee that appeared in the Connecticut Courant on December 24. That letter was reprinted in a handful of Massachusetts papers as a response to the Federal Farmer. Aside from these instances, the Federal Farmer was nowhere identified in the papers as the product of Lee's pen.

Surviving private correspondence is unhelpful in answering the question of authorship. Many contemporary writers admitted the author's identity was unknown to them, including Noah Webster, Timothy Pickering, and Edward Carrington, who was in New York with Lee at the time the pamphlets were composed. Lee was not the only writer accused by Federalists of producing the pamphlets—a correspondent of John Lamb accused him of diverting money from the New York impost into the production of "the foederal farmer and other false Libels." Historian Gordon S. Wood observes that at least in Connecticut, emphasizing the association of Lee with any Anti-Federalist production would have been a sound political move for the Federalists; the Lee family was reviled in the state due to the involvement of Arthur Lee, Richard Henry's brother, in instigating the recall of Connecticut merchant Silas Deane from his position as envoy to France.

The Boston Athenaeum in 1874 published a catalogue of its holdings that indicated Lee as the Federal Farmer; until just a few years prior, major catalogues had listed the pamphlets as anonymous, including the 1864 Library of Congress catalogue and an 1868 bibliography by Joseph Sabin. After the Athenaeum's publication, the Lee attribution appeared in a new Sabin volume in 1878, an 1888 edition of the first Federal Farmer pamphlet, and other documents.

=== Questioning Lee's authorship ===
In 1974, historian Gordon S. Wood presented the first complete argument against Lee's authorship. Wood argues that the letters were almost certainly not written by Lee; nothing in Lee's papers or memoirs supported the notion that he was the author. Lee is not known ever to have written an extended piece for public consumption, and Wood concludes that the production of 181 pages of pamphlets in less than half a year was not his style.

Wood identifies differences in style and content between the Federal Farmer pamphlets and a letter from Lee to Edmund Randolph that was published in various newspapers. While the Federal Farmer's style displays "moderation, reasonableness, and tentativeness," the letter known to be Lee's contained "exclamatory statements" and "charged phrases." The Federal Farmer makes references primarily to the New England states and New York, while Lee focuses particularly on the ways in which the proposed Constitution would be harmful to the South. Finally, Lee's letter and the Federal Farmer pamphlets recommend significantly different measures for remedying the problems with the proposed Constitution; Lee was particularly interested in limiting Congressional control over commerce while the Federal Farmer was most concerned with the threat posed to the states by excess consolidation of national power.

At about the same time as Wood, Herbert Storing, who was working on his 1981 collection The Complete Anti-Federalist, came to the same conclusion that the case for Lee's authorship was weak, the only original evidence being the Courant article. Storing, however, argues that the case against Lee's authorship is also weak. Work produced since Wood's paper has been mixed in its attribution of the pamphlets, with some writers not naming an author and others citing the work as Lee's. Authors who have taken the time to comment on the debate generally concur with Wood, and no scholar has attempted a substantial refutation of Wood's paper. Walter Bennett, editor of a 1979 edition of the Federal Farmer, disagrees with Wood on many points but concludes that the evidence for Lee is not "sufficient to justify continuing this attribution." The editors of The Documentary History of the Ratification of the Constitution declare Wood's challenge to Lee's authorship to be "effective."

Accepting that Lee did not write the pamphlet raises the question of who did. Wood asserts that the authorship of the pamphlets is a mystery that will probably never be solved, though he believes it probable that they were produced by a New York resident. Robert Webking argues that Melancton Smith was probably the author. Webking finds deep similarities between Smith's speeches at the New York ratifying convention and the Federal Farmer. Furthermore, a computational analysis of Smith's writings and speeches done by John Burrows found that Lee's authorship "found no support at all" and Smith was the most likely author. Smith, a New York lawyer, was one of the Anti-Federalist leaders at the New York convention, though he eventually voted for the Constitution. Webking speculates that Smith might have kept his authorship of the Federal Farmer pamphlets a close secret so as not to jeopardize his future as a politician in heavily Federalist New York City.

In 1998, John Kaminski proposed that Elbridge Gerry was the Federal Farmer. Among other evidence, Kaminski cites to Gerry’s 18 October 1787 objections, set forth in a letter to the Massachusetts Legislature.

Beginning in August of 1787, Elbridge Gerry became increasingly frustrated with the emerging draft of the Constitution. In a letter from Gerry to his wife Ann, Gerry promised to "leave no stone unturned" to prevent adoption of the Constitution.

== Argument ==
The Federal Farmer argues that the plan of the Constitution, while claimed to be a federal system and seeming to be so in some respects, will in the end annihilate the states by consolidating them into one national government. This concern over consolidation was among the most important of the Anti-Federalist objections to the Constitution; they saw the destruction of state sovereignty as inimical to freedom. Honest federalists, in the view of the Federal Farmer, wished for the substantial preservation of the state governments, but sought a federal government that was more than merely advisory. The letters indicate that the Federal Farmer ascribed to the compact theory of federalism.

The threat to federal government constituted a menace to republicanism. Without federalism, a republic the size of the United States would have grave difficulty giving fair representation to the varied interests of the people in the different states. Representatives in the national capital would have to be kept responsible to their constituents at home; the Federal Farmer believed that a large number of representatives was required to ensure a high ratio of representatives to constituents and guarantee that all classes would be fairly represented.

== Evaluation ==
The Federal Farmer letters are among the best-written and convincing pieces in the Anti-Federalist canon, and make regular appearances in collections of Anti-Federalist writing. Ralph Louis Ketcham writes that "though sometimes discursive and repetitious, the letters, skillfully written, moderate in tone, and thoughtful, were perhaps the most eloquent and persuasive anti-federalist writings."

== Bibliography ==
- Bennett, Walter Hartwell. Introduction to Letters from the Federal Farmer to the Republican. Tuscaloosa: University of Alabama Press, 1978.
- Main, Jackson Turner. The Antifederalists: Critics of the Constitution, 1781-1788. Chapel Hill: The University of North Carolina Press. 1961.
- Webking, Robert H. "Melancton Smith and the Letters from the Federal Farmer." The William and Mary Quarterly, 3rd series, 44 (1987): 510-528.
- Wood, Gordon S. "The Authorship of the Letters from the Federal Farmer." The William and Mary Quarterly, 3rd series, 31 (1974): 299-308.
- The Anti-Federalist. Ed. Herbert Storing. Chicago: The University of Chicago Press, 1985.
- The Anti-Federalist Papers. Ed. Ralph Loius Ketcham. New York: Signet Classic, 2003.
- The Documentary History of the Ratification of the Constitution. Vols. XIV-XV. Ed. John P. Kaminski and Gaspare J. Saladino. Madison: State Historical Society of Wisconsin, 1981. (Appears in notes as DHRC) Particularly used here is the editorial note appearing in pp. 14–18.
- Zuckert and Webb. The Anti-Federalist Writings of the Melancton Smith Circle. Indianapolis: Liberty Fund.
