= Suzanna Sherry =

American legal scholar

- Born: March 29, 1954 (age 72); New York City, U.S.
- Spouse: Paul Edelman
- Children: 2

Academic background
- Education: Middlebury College (BA); University of Chicago (JD)
- Academic advisor: Murray Dry

Academic work
- Discipline: Law
- Sub-discipline: Constitutional law
- Institutions: Vanderbilt University; University of Minnesota

Suzanna Sherry (born March 29, 1954) is an American legal scholar in the area of constitutional law with particular emphasis in the subject of federal courts. She is the Herman O. Loewenstein Chair Emerita at the Vanderbilt University Law School.

== Early life and education ==
Sherry was born on March 29, 1954, in New York City. She earned a Bachelor of Arts degree from Middlebury College in 1976, where she studied under Murray Dry. She earned a J.D. degree from the University of Chicago Law School in 1979.

== Career ==
After graduating from law school, Sherry served as a law clerk for Judge John Cooper Godbold of the United States Court of Appeals for the Fifth Circuit. She later worked as an associate at Miller Cassidy Larroca & Lewin in Washington, D.C. From 1982 to 2000, she was on the faculty of the University of Minnesota Law School. She joined Vanderbilt University in 2000. Sherry's primary works are Desperately Seeking Certainty: The Misguided Quest for Constitutional Foundations, Beyond All Reason: The Radical Assault on Truth in American Law, and A History of the American Constitution (each with Daniel A. Farber of the University of California's Boalt Hall). Beginning in 1986, Sherry studied Supreme Court Justice Sandra Day O'Connor's opinions as a part of research on female jurists. She has published numerous law review articles and essays, including on the topics of constitutional law, judicial activism, and the federal court system. Sherry's work has been published in the Harvard Law Review, Texas Law Review, Iowa Law Review, Michigan Law Review, the William & Mary Law Review, and others. Sherry retired from Vanderbilt in 2022, assuming the position of chair emerita.

== Personal life ==
Sherry is married to Paul Edelman, a professor of law and mathematics, who has authored and collaborated on many quantitative analyses of law and law and economics articles. They have 2 children.
