= 1787 New Hampshire gubernatorial election =

- March 13, 1787
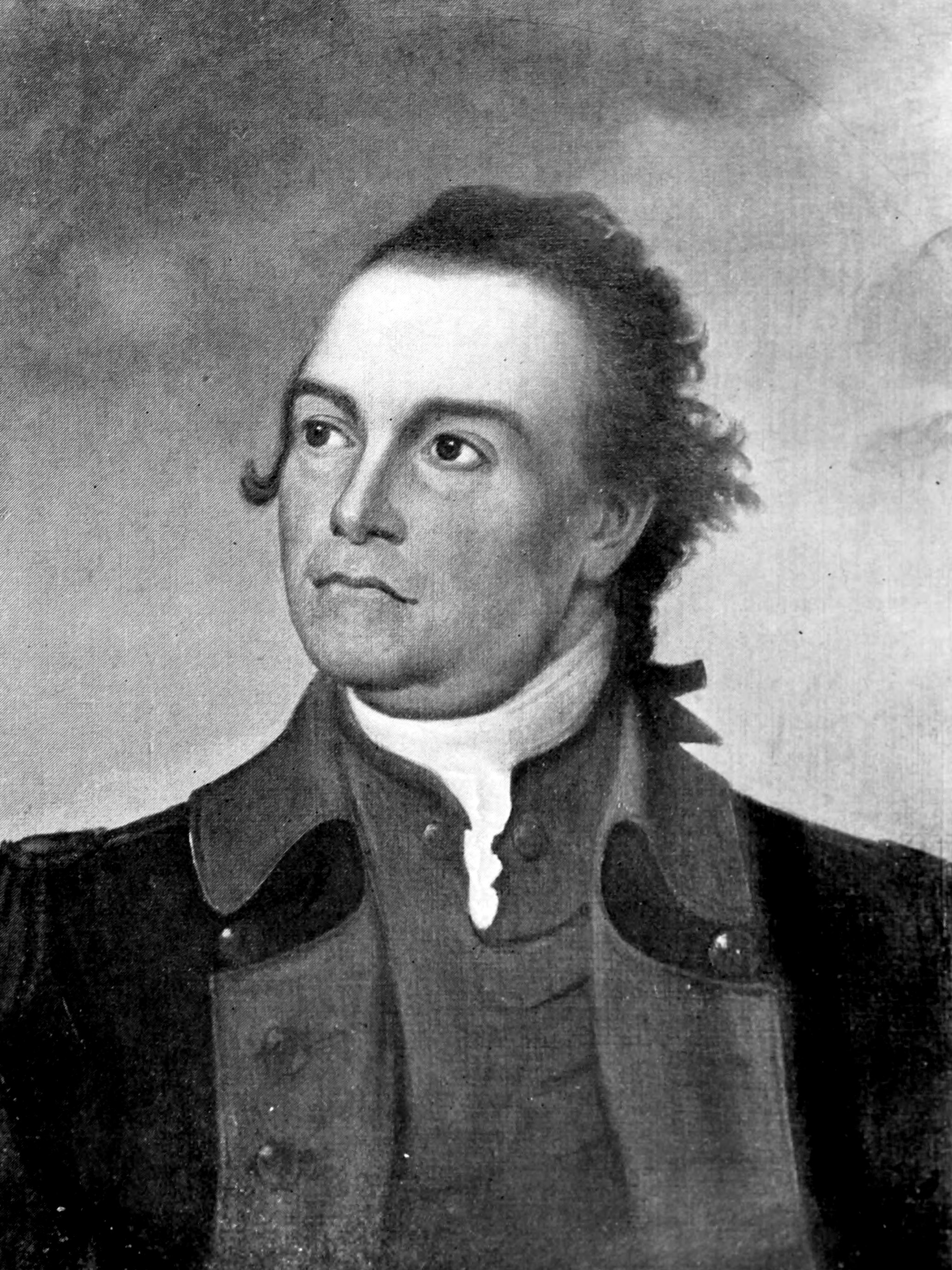

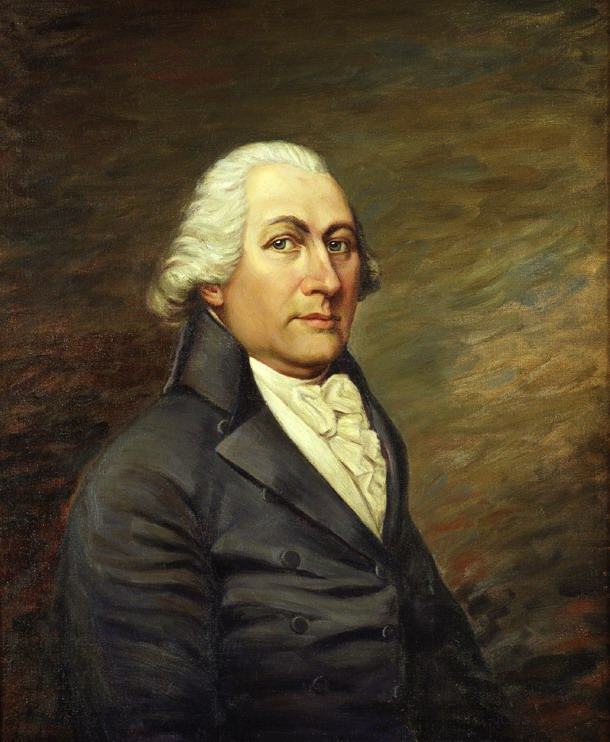

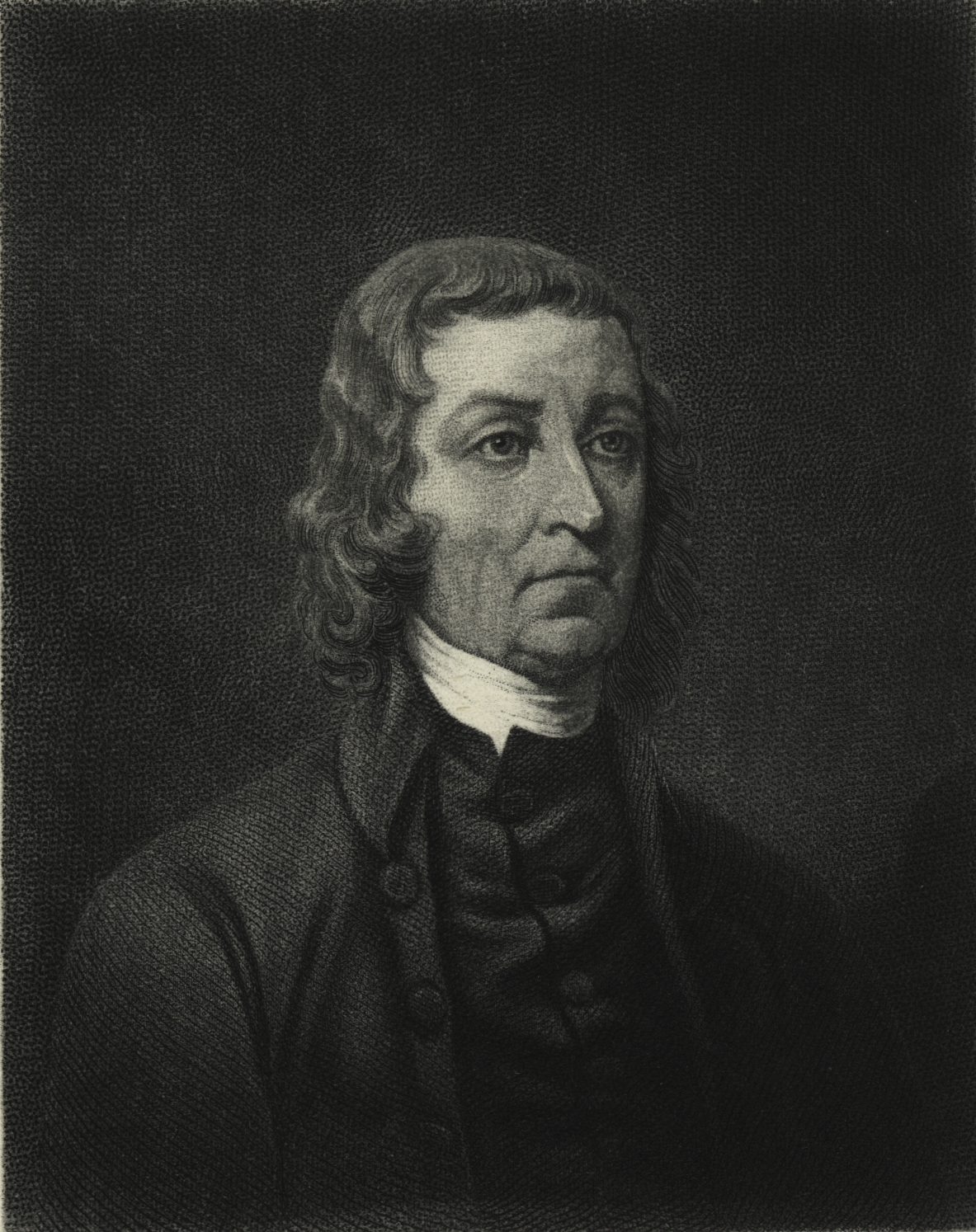

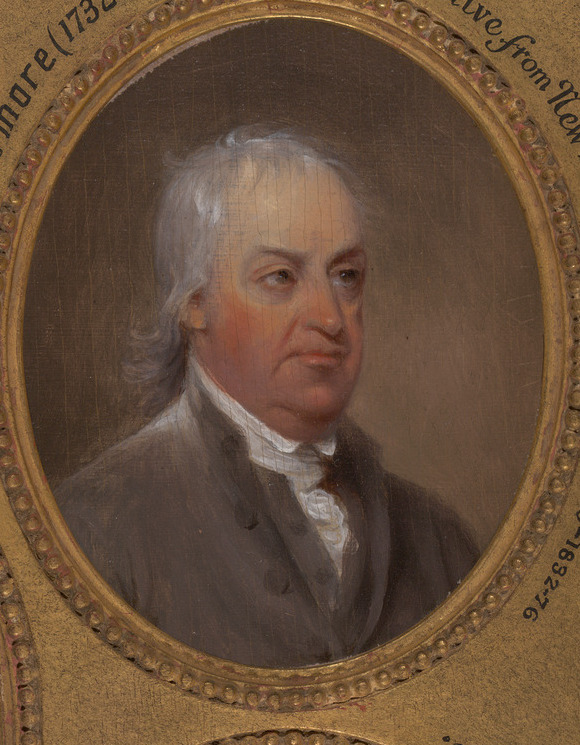
Nominee	John Sullivan	John Langdon
Party	Federalist	Anti-Federalist
Popular vote	3,642	4,034
Percentage	39.65%	43.92%
Nominee	Josiah Bartlett	Samuel Livermore
Party	Anti-Federalist	Federalist
Popular vote	628	603
Percentage	6.84%	6.57%
President before election
John Sullivan
Federalist
Elected President
John Sullivan
Federalist

The 1787 New Hampshire gubernatorial election was held on March 13, 1787, in order to elect the President of New Hampshire. (The office would be renamed to Governor in 1792.) Incumbent Federalist President John Sullivan defeated Anti-Federalist candidate and former President John Langdon, 1785 President Anti-Federalist candidate Josiah Bartlett and Federalist judge Samuel Livermore. Since no candidate received a majority in the popular vote, Sullivan was elected by the New Hampshire General Court per the state constitution, despite having come in second in the popular vote.

== General election ==
On election day, March 13, 1787, Anti-Federalist candidate and former President John Langdon won the popular vote by a margin of 392 votes against his foremost opponent Federalist candidate and incumbent President John Sullivan. But because no candidate received a majority of the popular vote, a separate election was held by the New Hampshire General Court, which chose Sullivan as the winner instead of Langdon. Sullivan thereby held Federalist control over the office of President and was sworn in for his second term on June 6, 1787.

=== Results ===
New Hampshire gubernatorial election, 1787
Party	Candidate	Votes	%
Federalist	John Sullivan (incumbent)	3,642	39.65
Anti-Federalist	John Langdon	4,034	43.92
Anti-Federalist	Josiah Bartlett	628	6.84
Federalist	Samuel Livermore	603	6.57
	Scattering	278	3.02
Total votes		9,185	100.00
Federalist hold			
