= Daniel A. Farber =

American legal scholar

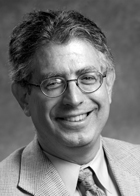
- Born: July 16, 1950 (age 76); Chicago, Illinois, U.S.

Academic background
- Education: University of Illinois at Urbana-Champaign (BA, MA, JD)

Academic work
- Discipline: Legal history
- Institutions: University of Minnesota; University of California, Berkeley

Daniel A. Farber (born July 16, 1950) is an American lawyer who is the Sho Sato Professor of Law at the UC Berkeley School of Law.

== Life and work ==
Born in Chicago, Illinois, Farber graduated from the University of Illinois, earning his B.A. (pre-law), M.A. (sociology), and J.D. degrees. He graduated summa cum laude from the College of Law, where he was class valedictorian. After graduating from law school, Farber clerked for Judge Philip Willis Tone on the United States Court of Appeals for the Seventh Circuit and Justice John Paul Stevens on the United States Supreme Court.

After a brief period in private practice, Farber joined the University of Illinois faculty in 1978. In 1981, he became a member of the University of Minnesota Law School faculty. He joined the Berkeley Law faculty in 2002, where he is currently co-director of the Center for Law, Energy, and the Environment. Farber has also served as a visiting professor at the University of Chicago Law School, Harvard Law School, and Stanford Law School.

Farber's academic interests include constitutional law, environmental law, and the history of American law. He has published over twenty books and nearly two hundred articles during his career. He has also taught a wide array of courses as a professor, including energy law, environmental law, First Amendment law, contracts, torts, and constitutional law.

Farber is a regular contributor to the Legal Planet blog, which analyzes developments in environmental law and policy.

== Selected works ==
- Contested Ground. How to Understand the Limits of Presidential Power (2021)
- Lincoln's Constitution (2003).
- Eco-Pragmatism: Making Sensible Environmental Decisions in an Uncertain World (1999).
- Environmental Law: Cases and Materials (1st ed. 1981, 2d ed. 1985, 3rd ed. 1991, 4th ed. 1995, 5th ed. 1999, 6th ed. 2003, Supp. 1983, 1988, 1993 & 1997) (with Roger W. Findley).
- The First Amendment (1998, 2d ed. 2003).
- Cases and Materials on Constitutional Law: Themes for the Constitution's Third Century (1st ed. 1993, 2d ed. 1998, 3d ed. 2003, Supp. 1996) (with William N. Eskridge Jr. and Philip P. Frickey).
- Beyond All Reason: The Radical Assault on Truth in American Law (1997) (with Suzanna Sherry).
- Environmental Law in a Nutshell (1st ed. 1983, 2d ed. 1988, 3d. ed. 1992, & 4th ed. 1996) (with Roger W. Findley).
- Law and Public Choice: A Critical Introduction (1991) (with Philip P. Frickey).
- A History of the American Constitution (1990) (with Suzanna Sherry).
- Retained by the People: The "Silent" Ninth Amendment and the Constitutional Rights Americans Don't Know They Have (2007).

== See also ==
- List of law clerks for the fourth seat of the Supreme Court of the United States
