= Paul O. Carrese =

American educator

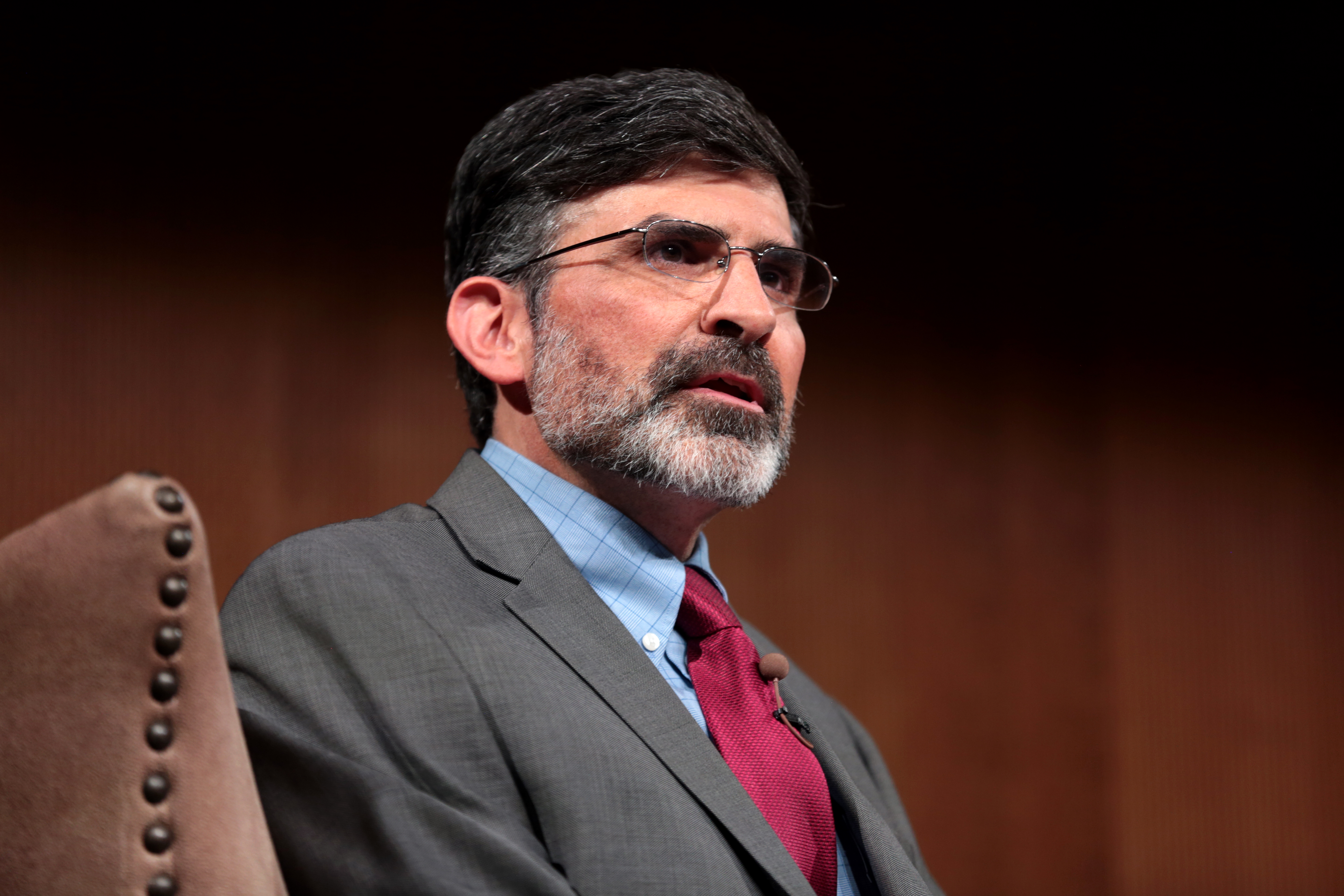
Carrese in 2018

Paul O. Carrese (kuh-REES) is a professor in the School of Civic & Economic Thought and Leadership at Arizona State University, and was its founding director, 2016-2023. For nearly two decades he was a professor of political science at the United States Air Force Academy. He is author of the books The Cloaking of Power: Montesquieu, Blackstone, and the Rise of Judicial Activism and Democracy in Moderation: Montesquieu, Tocqueville, and Sustainable Liberalism, and co-editor of two other books. His forthcoming book is Teaching America: Reflective Patriotism in Schools, College, and Culture (Cambridge University Press, expected 2026). He has held fellowships at Harvard University; the University of Delhi (as a Fulbright fellow); and the James Madison Program, Politics Department, Princeton University.

== Education ==
Carrese graduated from Middlebury College in Vermont with a B.A. in political science in 1989, where he studied with Murray Dry and Paul Nelson, before attending Oxford University on a Rhodes Scholarship. At Oxford's Pembroke College, he earned two master's degrees, one in politics and philosophy in 1991 and one in theology in 1993. He received his Ph.D. in political science from Boston College in 1998.

== Career ==
From 1993 to 1995, Carrese was a teaching assistant at Boston College, and he taught at Middlebury College from 1996 to 1998. After receiving his Ph.D., Carrese took a position at the U.S. Air Force Academy in Colorado Springs as an assistant professor of political science. In 2000, he became an associate professor, and in 2003 a full professor. He was the co-founder of the Academy's great-books honors program, the Scholars Program, and served as its second Director. He was awarded a post-doctoral fellowship in the Government Department of Harvard University, 2000–2001; a Fulbright fellowship at University of Delhi in New Delhi, 2007-2008; and a research fellowship in the James Madison Program on American Ideals and Institutions, Politics Department, Princeton University in 2012–13. At the Air Force Academy and at Arizona State University Carrese's teaching focuses on American political and constitutional thought, Western political philosophy, comparative political philosophy, statecraft and strategy, and civics.

In fall 2016 he became the first Director of the School of Civic & Economic Thought and Leadership at Arizona State University in Tempe, an interdisciplinary department in liberal arts and American civics that prepares leaders for American civil society and statesman-like leaders for public service. The model of a public university establishing a state-mandated, and separately funded, academic unit focused on civic thought and leadership has spread, as of 2024, to a total of eight states and 13 public university campuses.

Carrese is a Senior Fellow for Civic Thought and Leadership with the Jack Miller Center for Teaching America's Founding Principles and History, and a Visiting Scholar during 2025 at the Center for Revitalizing American Institutions, Hoover Institution, Stanford University. He also has served since 2024 on the standing Committee on Civic Education of the American Political Science Association.
