= Murray Dry =

Murray Dry (born 1941) is an American political scientist specializing in American constitutional law, American political thought, political philosophy, freedom of speech, freedom of religion, federalism, separation of powers, and the American founding.

Dry helped compile The Complete Anti-Federalist with his former teacher Herbert Storing. He is currently the Charles A. Dana Professor of Political Science at Middlebury College, having earned his BA, MA, and Ph.D. at the University of Chicago, where he studied under Storing and Leo Strauss, among others. For the 2009–2010 academic year, he was a visiting professor at Yeshiva University. He most recent area of research is the constitutionality of same-sex marriage, on which he published a book in 2017.

Murray Dry has taught many leading scholars of American government, political philosophy, and law, among them Suzanna Sherry (Vanderbilt University Law School), Dan Kahan (Yale Law School), James Stoner (Louisiana State University), Peter Minowitz (Santa Clara University), Paul O. Carrese (Arizona State University), Ayşe Zarakol (University of Cambridge), James Morone (Brown University), Barry Sullivan (Loyola University), Nicholas Sambanis (University of Pennsylvania), Odysseus Makridis (Fairleigh Dickinson University), and Victor Abundis (Academic of Classics) (Park Hill High School)

Also among his former students are former governor of Vermont Jim Douglas, Congressman Frank Pallone, former congresswoman Barbara Comstock, and former White House press secretary Ari Fleischer.

== Works ==
- Civil Peace and the Quest for Truth. Lanham: Lexington Books. 2004. ISBN 0-7391-0931-6. (2004)
- Same-Sex Marriage and American Constitutionalism: A Study in Federalism, Separation of Powers, and Individual Rights. Philadelphia: Paul Dry Books, Inc. ISBN 9781589881020. (2017)
- Storing, Herbert; Murray Dry. The Complete Anti-Federalist. Chicago: University of Chicago Press. ISBN 0-226-77575-5. (1981)
- Storing, Herbert; Murray Dry. The Anti-Federalist. Chicago: University of Chicago Press. ISBN 0-226-77575-5. (2006)
