= James Morone =

American political scientist (born 1951)

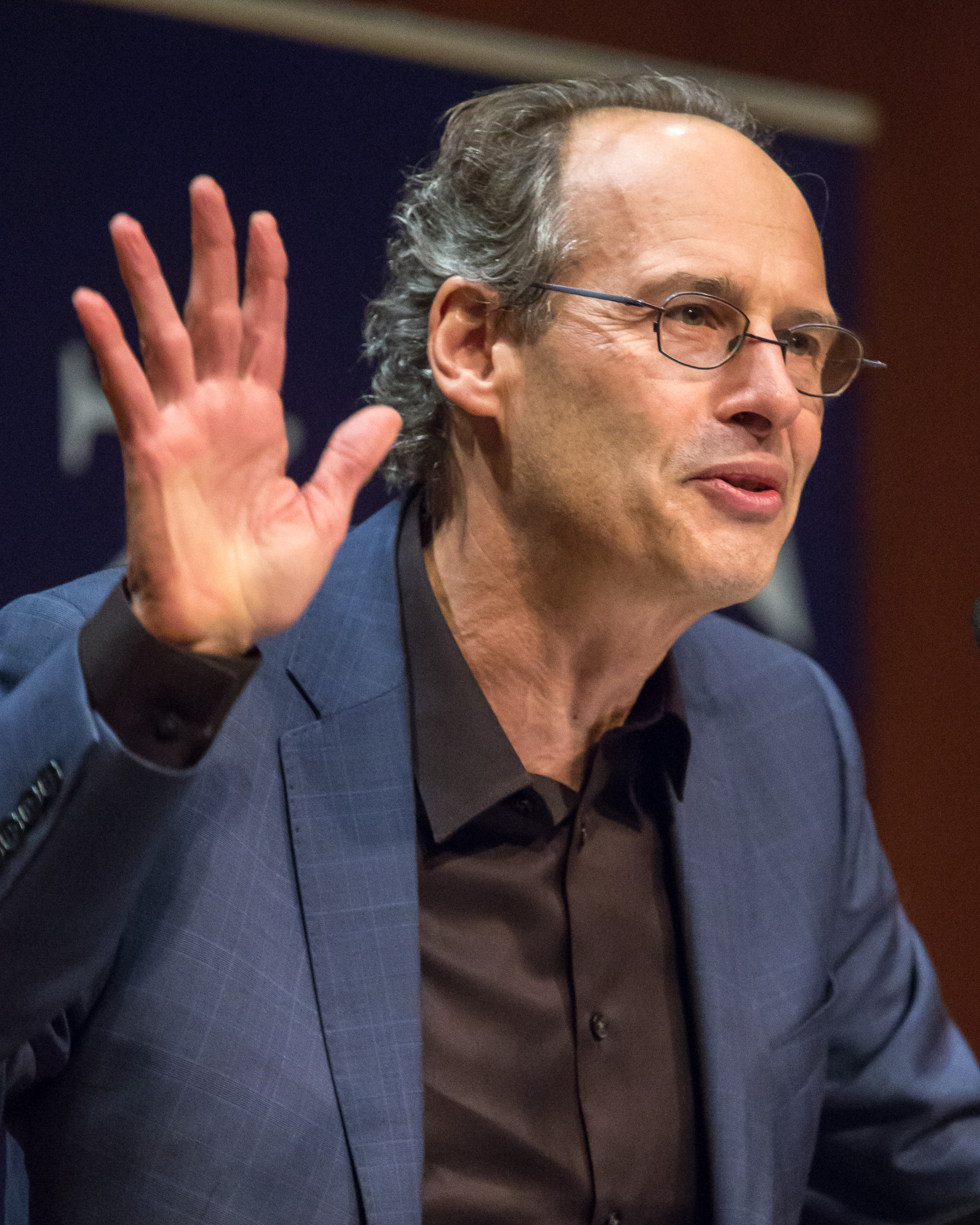
- 2015 photo
- Born: James Morone; 1951 (age 74–75)
- Education: Middlebury College (B.A.); University of Chicago (Ph.D.)
- Known for: Wealthy, Healthy and Fair, Hellfire Nation, The Democratic Wish
- Scientific career
- Fields: Political Science, Health care in the United States, Participatory democracy
- Workplaces: Brown University

James A. Morone (born 1951) is an American political scientist and author, noted for his work on health politics and policy and on popular participation and morality in American politics and political development.

Morone graduated with a B.A. from Middlebury College in 1973, where he studied under Professor Murray Dry, and then attended graduate school at the University of Chicago, where he completed an M.A. in 1976 and a PhD degree in political science in 1982. His doctoral dissertation examined "The dilemma of citizen action: representation and bureaucracy in local health politics."

Morone has taught at Brown University since 1982 and is a professor of political science and urban studies. He has also been a visiting professor at Yale University, the University of Bremen, and the University of Chicago.

Morone's book Hellfire Nation (2003) is nonfiction. The Democratic Wish (1990) was awarded the Gladys M. Kammerer Award for the best book on American national policy by the American Political Science Association (APSA).

Morone edited the Journal of Health Politics, Policy and Law from 1989 to 1994. He was president of the Politics and History Section of APSA for 1999–2000 and of the New England Political Science Association for 2002–03. Along with Rogan Kersh, Morone completed a college textbook on American government titled "By the People" with Oxford University Press in 2012.

== Selected publications ==
- The Devils We Know: Us and Them in America's Raucous Political Culture. 2014. University Press of Kansas.
- By the People: Debating American Government. 2012. Oxford University Press. (written with Rogan Kersh)
- The Heart of Power: Health Politics in the Oval Office. 2009. University of California Press. (written with David Blumenthal).
- Wealthy, Healthy and Fair: The Politics of Health Care for a Good Society. 2005. Oxford University Press. (edited with Lawrence Jacobs).
- "Storybook Truths about America". 2005. Studies in American Political Development 19(2): 216–226.
- Hellfire Nation: The Politics of Sin in American History. 2003. Yale University Press.
- Health Care Policy in the USA and Germany: Market Forces in Cross National Perspective. 1996. NOMOS Verlang. (edited with Bernard Braun, Johann Behrens, and Deborah Stone).
- "The Struggle for American Culture." 1996. PS: Political Science and Politics 29(3): 424–430.
- The Politics of Health Care Reform: Lessons from the Past, Prospects for the Future. 1994. Duke University Press. (edited with Gary Belkin).
- The Democratic Wish: Popular Participation and the Limits of American Government. 1990. Basic Books.
- The Politics of Innovation: The Evolution of Hospital Regulation in New Jersey. 1983. Health Research and Education Trust. (written with Andrew Dunham).
