= Article Seven of the United States Constitution =

Portion of the US Constitution regarding requirements for ratification

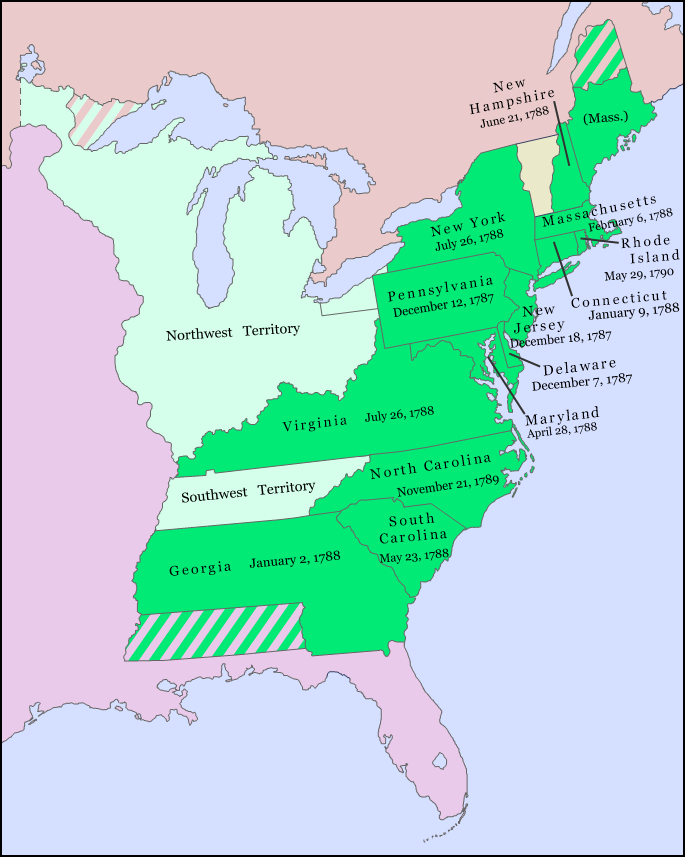
Dates the 13 states ratified the Constitution

Article Seven of the United States Constitution sets the number of state ratifications necessary for the Constitution to take effect and prescribes the method through which the states may ratify it. Under the terms of Article VII, constitutional ratification conventions were held in each of the thirteen states, with the ratification of nine states required for the Constitution to take effect. Delaware was the first state to ratify the Constitution, doing so on December 7, 1787. On June 21, 1788, New Hampshire became the ninth state to ratify the Constitution, thereby placing the Constitution into effect. Rhode Island was the last of the thirteen original states to ratify the Constitution under Article VII, doing so on May 29, 1790.

== Text ==
The Ratification of the Conventions of nine States, shall be sufficient for the Establishment of this Constitution between the States so ratifying the Same.

== Attestation Clause ==
In the Constitution immediately following the above language, the Constitutional Convention set out a closing statement known as the Attestation Clause. The clause is often identified as Article VII's second clause.

done in Convention by the Unanimous Consent of the States present the Seventeenth Day of September in the Year of our Lord one thousand seven hundred and Eighty seven and of the Independance of the United States of America the Twelfth In witness whereof We have hereunto subscribed our Names,

The language was drafted by Gouverneur Morris and proposed on the convention floor by Benjamin Franklin. James Madison, in his Notes on the Constitutional Convention, called it an “ambiguous form” meant to win over dissenting delegates. Because the convention voted by state, the signatures attest that the states present consented, not that each signer personally approved the document. Eleven states voted on the final question. Alexander Hamilton signed for New York even though, as its only delegate present, he could not cast the state's vote. Rhode Island never sent delegates. Thirty-nine of the forty-two delegates present signed; Edmund Randolph, George Mason, and Elbridge Gerry refused. George Washington signed first, as president of the convention and deputy from Virginia, and the other signers are grouped by state. The convention's secretary, William Jackson, added a signed note verifying handwritten corrections to the text.

Scholars disagree about whether the Attestation Clause is part of the Constitution's legal text. Akhil Reed Amar argues that it is not part of the Constitution, because the state ratifying conventions did not ratify it. Others argue the opposite, contending that the state ratifying conventions approved the document as a single whole, so the Attestation Clause was ratified along with the rest.

== Ratification ==
On September 20, 1787, three days after its adoption by the Constitutional Convention, the drafted Constitution was submitted to the Congress of the Confederation for its endorsement. After eight days of debate, the opposing sides came to the first of many compromises that would define the ratification process. The Confederation Congress voted to release the proposed Constitution to the states for their consideration, but neither endorsed nor opposed its ratification.

The Constitution was ratified by the 13 states between December 7, 1787, and May 29, 1790, as follows:

	State and date	Votes		PCT
	State and date	Yea	Nay	PCT
1	Delaware – December 7, 1787	30	0	100%
2	Pennsylvania – December 12, 1787	46	23	67%
3	New Jersey – December 18, 1787	38	0	100%
4	Georgia – January 2, 1788	26	0	100%
5	Connecticut – January 9, 1788	128	40	76%
6	Massachusetts – February 6, 1788	187	168	53%
7	Maryland – April 28, 1788	63	11	85%
8	South Carolina – May 23, 1788	149	73	67%
9	New Hampshire – June 21, 1788	57	47	55%
10	Virginia – June 25, 1788	89	79	53%
11	New York – July 26, 1788	30	27	53%
12	North Carolina – November 21, 1789	194	77	72%
13	Rhode Island – May 29, 1790	34	32	52%
Total:		1071	577	65%

== Implementation ==
In 1787 and 1788, following the Constitutional Convention, a great debate took place throughout the United States over the Constitution that had been proposed. The supporters of the Constitution began the ratification campaign in those states where there was little or no controversy, postponing until later the more difficult ones.

On June 21, 1788, New Hampshire became the ninth state to ratify the Constitution, thus establishing it as the new framework of governance for the United States. Though officially enacted, four states, Virginia, New York, North Carolina, and Rhode Island remained outside the new government. The Congress of the Confederation chose March 4, 1789, as the day "for commencing proceedings under the Constitution." Virginia and New York ratified the Constitution before the members of the new Congress assembled on the appointed day to bring the new government into operation.

After twelve amendments, including the ten in the Bill of Rights, were sent to the states in June 1789, North Carolina ratified the Constitution. Finally, Rhode Island, after having rejected the Constitution in a March 1788 referendum, called a ratifying convention in 1790. Faced with the threat of being treated as a foreign government, it ratified the Constitution by just two votes.

== See also ==
- Timeline of drafting and ratification of the United States Constitution
- The Federalist Papers
- Anti-Federalist Papers
