= Herbert Storing =

American political scientist (1928–1977)

Herbert J. Storing (January 28, 1928 – September 9, 1977) was an American political scientist with broad ranging interests who is best known for reviving the serious study of the American Founding. The constitutional theorist and American politics scholar Walter Berns called him "the most profound man I have encountered in the field of American studies."

== Career ==
Storing received his A.B. degree from Colgate University in 1950. He then attended the University of Chicago, earning his A.M. in 1951 and Ph.D. in 1956. His dissertation chair was C. Herman Pritchett and he studied with Leonard D. White, Robert Horn and Leo Strauss. He was a Fulbright Scholar to the United Kingdom from 1953 to 1955 and also received research grants from the Rockefeller, Ford, and Relm Foundations and from the National Endowment for the Humanities.

Storing served as senior research assistant at the London School of Economics; as assistant, associate, and professor of political science at the University of Chicago (1956–77) where he worked closely with Joseph Cropsey; and as director of the Telluride summer program at the Hampton Institute in 1967. He was Visiting Charles Evans Hughes Professor of Jurisprudence at Colgate University from 1968 to 1969, and part-time professor of political science at Northern Illinois University from 1969 to 1975.

Storing submitted suggested text for the bicentennial speeches of President Gerald Ford and, together with Martin Diamond, testified before Congress regarding the Electoral College.

At the time of his death in September 1977, Storing was Robert Kent Gooch Professor of Government and Foreign Affairs at the University of Virginia, where he also served as director of the Study of the Presidency at the White Burkett Miller Center for Public Affairs. He was also a member of the President's Commission on White House Fellows.

== Thought and scholarship ==
=== American founding ===
Prior to Storing, 20th-century scholars tended to study the American Founding Fathers from the standpoint of historicism, contextualism, and ideological history. The approaches characterized the political thought of all of the founders as tethered to the extant practices and opinions of the late 18th and the early 19th centuries. Characteristic of that approach was Charles A. Beard’s 1913 book Economic Interpretation of the Constitution, which maintained that "the structure of the Constitution of the United States was motivated primarily by the personal financial interests of the Founding Fathers."

In contrast, Storing helped create a new approach to the American founding within the fields of political science and political theory, one whose principles held that the thought of the American founders could and should be understood as relevant to the contemporary study of politics. For Storing, that meant engaging with the arguments of the founders on their own terms, as opposed to reading those arguments primarily in light of the social, political, and economic conditions that likely shaped them. Storing by no means denied the relevance of these conditions in attaining an informed view of what the founders thought. Indeed, as Storing emphasizes in his essay, "The Other Federalists," most writers from the founding period were bound to the consensus opinions of their times. What distinguished Storing's approach was his openness to founding thinkers like James Madison and Alexander Hamilton, who saw further and thought more deeply than their contemporaries did about the nature of political life and institutions and so whose thought cannot simply be reduced either to personal motivations or shared opinions.

Emblematic of Storing's concern with the founding is his treatment of the Federalist-Anti-Federalist debates, to whose study he contributed his 1981 seven-volume study, The Complete Anti-Federalist, which was described by a New York Times reviewer as "a work of magnificent scholarship" and its publication a "civic event of enduring importance." Storing believed that the debate illuminated the deepest commitments of the American regime because the Anti-Federalists felt it was in their interest to expose the true character of the new constitutional order. The debate was made profound because the critique of the proposed constitution developed by the most thoughtful of the Anti-Federalists, such as Brutus or the penetrating writer Mercy Warren, forced the Federalists to give a more sophisticated defense of their creation than they might otherwise have done. For Storing, the issues raised in this debate, some of which were unresolved at the time and remain unresolved today, pertain to the essential nature of the American regime, and are therefore of enduring relevance to scholars of all aspects of American politics.

=== Race and politics ===
Storing began teaching and writing about race and politics well before the topic became important for the field of political science. For example, Storing published his first writing on race and politics, "The School of Slavery: A Reconsideration of Booker T. Washington," in 1964, whereas the Race, Ethnicity, and Politics section of the American Political Science Association was not founded until 1995. His singular contribution was to show how black Americans are culturally in the position to see the American regime more clearly than do white Americans.

For Storing, the lens through which black Americans view their country can "provide a clean, sharp view of America, exposing its innermost and fundamental principles and tendencies, which are largely ignored or vaguely seen through half-closed eyes by the majority of white Americans, whose circumstances do not compel them to look at their country and to wonder about it." Because black people experience political, social, and economic alienation in ways that white people do not, they are in a position "to take seriously the possibility of revolution, or rejection, or separation. [They] thus [share] the perspective of a serious revolutionary." Seeing the American regime as a genuine revolutionary means appealing "from the imperfect world of convention and tradition…to the world of nature and truth. In important respects, then, black Americans are like a revolutionary or…a founding generation…[T]hey are in the difficult but potentially glorious position of not being able to take for granted given political arrangements and values, or having seriously to canvass alternatives, to think through their implications, and to make a deliberate choice."

Relatedly, Storing articulated and developed Frederick Douglass’ critique of the constitutional theory that was (ironically) shared by the radical abolitionists—such as William Lloyd Garrison—and the defenders of slavery—such as Roger Brooke Taney. Following Douglass’ insights, Storing contended that while peripheral elements of the 1789 Constitution either maintained slavery—the "three-fifths clause" and the "fugitive slave clause"—or tacitly acknowledged it—the clause prohibiting the outlawing of the slave trade until after 1808—the core elements of the Constitution were progressively egalitarian.

=== Public administration and the public interest ===
Storing emphasized the importance of the common good, as opposed to the mere aggregation of competing goods, in thinking about how individuals and groups relate to the polity to which they belong. As a consequence, Storing developed a searching critique both of the idea of scientific administration and of theories of pluralism and group politics. For Storing, "[j]ust what specific civil rights and duties flow from government’s origin in natural rights is by no means obvious and thus defines much of the task of both lawmakers and jurists in a liberal political order." For this reason, genuine political judgement is an essential component of both interest group politics and public administration. In this regard, Storing questioned theories of interest group politics and public administration which sought to diminish the role of political judgement and to emphasize the promise of purely scientific—i.e., non "value-based"—determinations as to how resources ought to be distributed in a regime. Specifically, Storing challenged "the radical disjunction between deciding what to do (politics determining the end) and actually carrying it out (administration fixing the means)."

In respect to the American constitutional order in particular, Storing argued (contrary to many scholars of constitutional law and the American founding) that founders such as Hamilton and Madison had a developed sense of robust administration and that the constitutive choices they made in framing the architecture of the American regime prefigured and set in motion what many today call "big government." Unlike their Anti-Federalist opponents who believed that "republics had to be small enough that citizens would identify their private interests with the public good and would willingly carry out the laws with little need for governmental compulsion or force." Storing showed that leading Federalists were committed to a political future in which uniform and effective administration would not depend on citizens’ private virtue, but rather would be guaranteed by the workings of a carefully designed central government.

=== Statesmanship and the American presidency ===
In his writings on statesmanship and the American Presidency, Storing "sketches the essential elements of democratic statesmanship and their grounding in the American constitutional order." Storing questioned the views that the American presidency is either a purely administrative institution designed merely to carry out the will of the Congress (thereby fulfilling the ancillary role described and critiqued by Richard Neustadt) or that the President is a unitary executive with discretion on its own, and accountable to no other elements in the regime (e.g., the Congress) besides the people at large. Storing argued that "[t]he beginning of wisdom about the American presidency is to see that it contains both principles [i.e., the administrative and the political] and to reflect on their complex and subtle relation." Following Hamilton in the Federalist, Storing sought to elucidate why energy is so fundamental to executive power and how the institutional design of Article II induces energetic presidential leadership in its office holders; he also sought to explain how the presidency is designed not merely to serve popular will but, at times, to discipline and direct it.

Relatedly, Storing distinguished between different conceptions of statesmanship and how they relate to constitutional government. In particular, he identified "old" statesmanship as political leadership that actually forges and imposes a political identity and ethical norms on a people—i.e., the kind of leadership exercised by the American founders. This he distinguished from a narrower form of statesmanship that is compatible with constitutional liberalism and its toleration of diverse conceptions of the good life.

== Personal life and teaching ==
Storing was born on January 29, 1928, in Ames, Iowa. His father, James A. Storing, was a professor, Provost and, for a time, acting president of Colgate University. He served in the U.S. Army after World War II, from 1946 to 1948.

Storing was an unusually dedicated graduate teacher and adviser. As his close friend Walter Berns recalled, "It seemed to me that he must have served on at least half of the [University of Chicago political science] department’s dissertation committees, a disproportionate number as chairman. At any rate, I have a memory of manuscripts piled on his desk awaiting his attention. Unlike some professors I have known, Storing read them all with great care. His students will attest to this."

His notable students include: Joseph M. Bessette, Michael Zuckert, Jeffrey K. Tulis, John Rohr, Murray Dry and Gary Schmitt.

Storing regularly provided his graduate students with further opportunities to learn outside of the classroom, hosting extra-curricular seminars as well as reading groups. As his colleague Joseph Cropsey wrote: "Storing was a powerful, extremely influential teacher. The forthrightness and uprightness of the scholar in his writing were forcefully manifest in the man as presence. His logic straightened his thought without hardening his heart; his students learned from his example the difference between sentiment and sentimentality."

== Bibliography ==
- Toward a More Perfect Union: Writings of Herbert J. Storing – Edited by Joseph M. Bessette. Washington, D.C.: The AEI Press, 1995.
- The Anti-Federalist – Editor. Abridged by Murray Dry from The Complete Anti-Federalist. Chicago: University of Chicago Press, 1985.
- What the Anti-Federalists Were For: The Political Thought of the Opponents of the Constitution – Chicago: University of Chicago Press, 1981; reprinted in 2008.
- The Complete Anti-Federalist – Editor. 7 vols. Chicago: University of Chicago Press, 1981.
- What Country Have I? Political Writings by Black Americans – Editor. New York: St. Martin's Press, 1970.
- The State and the Farmer – With Peter Self. Berkeley: University of California Press, 1963; paperback edition, 1971.
- Essays on the Scientific Study of Politics – Editor. Author of "The Science of Administration: Herbert A. Simon." New York: Holt, Rinehart and Winston, 1962.
- "The Constitution and the Bill of Rights" – In Robert Goldwin and William Schambra, eds. How Does the Constitution Secure Rights? Washington, DC: AEI Press, 1985.
- "The Constitutional Convention: Toward a More Perfect Union" – In Morton J. Frisch and Richard G. Stevens, eds. American Political Thought: The Philosophic Dimensions of American Statesmanship. Ithaca, IL: F. E. Peacock Publishers, Inc., 1983.
- "Frederick Douglass" – In Morton J. Frisch and Richard G. Stevens, eds. American Political Thought: The Philosophic Dimensions of American Statesmanship. Second edition. Itasca, IL: Peacock, 1983.
- "Federalists and Anti-Federalists: The Ratification Debate" – In What the Anti-Federalists Were For. Chicago: University of Chicago Press, 1981.
- "The Federal Constitution of 1787: Politics, Principles, and Statesmanship" – In Ralph A. Rossum and Gary L. McDowell, eds. The American Founding: Politics, Statesmanship, and the Constitution. Port Washington, NY: Kennikat Press, 1981.
- "American Statesmanship: Old and New" – In Robert Goldwin, ed. Bureaucracy, Policy Analysis, Statesmen: Who Leads?Washington, DC: AEI Press, 1980.
- "Foreword" to John Rohr, Ethics for Bureaucrats: An Essay in Law and Values. New York: Marcel Dekker, 1978.
- "Martin Diamond" – PS: Political Science & Politics (Fall 1977).
- "In Defense of the Electoral College" – Statement on Proposals for Direct Popular Election of the President of the United States, July 22, 1977.
- "Slavery and the Moral Foundations of the American Republic" – In Robert A. Goldwin and Art Kaufman, eds. Slavery and Its Consequences: The Constitution, Equality, and Race. Waldorf, MD: AEI Press, 1988. Also in Robert H. Horwitz, ed. The Moral Foundations of the American Republic. Charlottesville, VA: University of Virginia Press, 1986; reprinted in 2001.
- "The Founders and Slavery" – College xxviii, no. 2, (July 1976).
- "The ‘Other’ Federalist Papers: A Preliminary Sketch" – Political Science Reviewer (1976).
- "Liberal Education and the Common Man" – Unpublished essay written for a conference at Hillsdale College in February 1975.
- "A Plan for Studying the Presidency" – Proposal submitted to the White Burkett Miller Center at the University of Virginia in 1975.
- "The Presidency and the Constitution" – Unpublished essay from a speech delivered at Beloit College in March 1974.
- "The Achievement of Leo Strauss" – National Review 25 (December 7, 1973).
- "Interest Groups and the Public Interest" – With Peter Self. The State and the Farmer. Berkeley: University of California Press, 1963; paperback edition, 1971.
- "Introduction" to What Country Have I? Political Writings by Black Americans. New York: St. Martin's Press, 1970.
- "The Case Against Civil Disobedience" – In Robert A. Goldwin, ed. On Civil Disobedience. Chicago: Rand McNally, 1969.
- "Introduction" to Charles C. Thach Jr., The Creation of the Presidency. Baltimore, MD: The Johns Hopkins University Press, 1969.
- "Foreword" to Paul Eidelberg, The Philosophy of the American Constitution: A Reinterpretation of the Intentions of the Founding Fathers. New York: The Free Press, 1968.
- "The Role of Government in Society" – Unpublished essay from a speech delivered at the University of North Carolina on February 25, 1967.
- "The Crucial Link: Public Administration, Responsibility, and the Public Interest" – Public Administration Review 24, no. 1 (March 1965).
- "Leonard D. White and the Study of Public Administration" – Public Administration Review 25, no. 1 (March 1965), 38–51.
- "The School of Slavery: A Reconsideration of Booker T. Washington" – In Robert A. Goldwin, ed. One Hundred Years of Emancipation. Chicago: Rand McNally, 1964.
- "Political Parties and the Bureaucracy" – In Robert A. Goldwin, ed. Political Parties U.S.A. Chicago: Rand McNally, 1964.
- Replies to Wolin and Schaar – American Political Science Review 57 (March 1963).
- "The Problem of Big Government" – In Robert A. Goldwin, ed. A Nation of States: Essays on the American Federal System. Chicago: Rand McNally, 1963.
- "William Blackstone" – In Leo Strauss and Joseph Cropsey, eds. History of Political Philosophy. Chicago: Rand McNally, 1963, 1972; Chicago: University of Chicago, 1987.
- The Science of Administration: Herbert A. Simon – In Essays on the Scientific Study of Politics. New York: Holt, Rinehart and Winston, 1962.
- The Birch in the Cupboard – With Peter Self. Public Law (Winter 1960). Reprinted in The State and the Farmer, Berkeley: University of California Press, 1963; paperback edition, 1971.
- The "Chicago School" of Political Science – Unpublished essay from remarks delivered to graduate students at the University of Chicago, early 1960s.
- The Farmers and the State – With Peter Self. The Political Quarterly 29, no. 1 (January 1958): 17–22.
