= Albany Antifederal Committee =

Group in New York

The Albany Antifederal Committee was a group formed in 1788 in Albany, New York by several Anti-Federalist politicians and business leaders critical of the proposed United States Constitution. The committee sought to sway public opinion and influence who would be selected to participate in the upcoming constitutional ratifying convention. On April 10, 1788, the committee published a circular in The Albany gazette that included over thirty objections to the constitution and answers to five common Federalist assertions. The stated objections included: the powers of Congress, the president, and the courts; the long term of federal officers; counting slaves in apportioning representation; the lack of a bill of rights; and the Supremacy Clause of Article Six.

In general, the committee believed that the proposed government would be more arbitrary and despotic than that of Britain. In an April 23, 1788 circular, the committee argued that the Constitution created not a federal government but a consolidated, national government.
