= Melancton Smith =

American politician

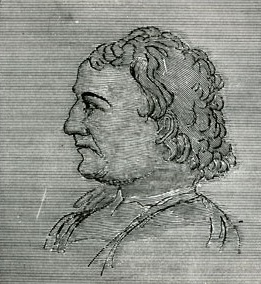
- Sketch of Melancton Smith

Personal details
- Born: May 7, 1744 Jamaica, New York, British America
- Died: July 29, 1798 (aged 54) New York City, U.S.
- Party: Anti-Federalist

Melancton Smith (May 7, 1744 – July 29, 1798) was a merchant, lawyer and a New York delegate to the Continental Congress. Praised for his intelligence, liberality, and reasonableness, Smith attained considerable respect in the State of New York by 1787 and he has been described by modern scholars as the most important Anti-Federalist theorist and spokesman. Additionally, Smith played an active and central role in the ratification of the United States Constitution.

== Biography ==
Melancton Smith was born in Jamaica, Long Island, New York, and was homeschooled by his parents. When his family moved to Poughkeepsie, New York, he became involved in the mercantile business. Smith manifested a life-long interest in metaphysics and religion, and in 1769 he helped organize the Washington Hollow Presbyterian Church and purchased one of its pews.

=== Career in New York ===
He became a delegate to the first New York Provincial Congress in New York on May 22, 1775. He served in the Continental Line Regiment on June 30, 1775, which he organized as the Dutchess County Rangers. On Feb. 11, 1777, he became one of three members of a Dutchess County commission for "inquiring into, detecting and defeating all conspiracies ... against the liberties of America;" he served for the next six months administering oaths of allegiance, arresting suspects, informing upon and examining Loyalists. While wielding this powerful civil and military authority, he was also serving as sheriff of Dutchess County. He extended his land holdings by purchasing some of the forfeited Loyalist estates. In May 1777 was appointed Sheriff of Dutchess County, an office he retained until 1781. In the following year, the Provincial Commission selected Smith to be the Second Judge on the Court of Common Pleas. He was also elected to be the Justice of the Peace in Dutchess County and held both positions until 1784, when he and his family moved to New York City.

=== US Constitution ===
Smith moved to New York City in 1784 where he became a prominent merchant. He helped found the New York Manumission Society in opposition to slavery and served in the Continental Congress from 1785 to 1787. He played an active role in the writing of the Northwest Ordinance of 1787.

Smith was the most important Anti-Federalist member of the State ratification convention at Poughkeepsie in 1788, where he made many of the same arguments as the Federal Farmer, bore the brunt of the Federalist attack and got into heated debates with Alexander Hamilton. Smith was so successful in opposing even Hamilton that he had been characterized as "one of the ablest debaters in the country". Following the ratification of the Constitution by New Hampshire and Virginia, and a letter he received from Nathan Dane, Smith became convinced that New York had no choice but to accept the ratification of the Constitution and could not afford to wait until it had been amended because of external threats. His vote for the Constitution, albeit with the recommendation of amendments, broke Anti-Federalist ranks and brought down Governor George Clinton's wrath.

He was one of the few important landowners and merchants among the Anti-Federalists, and Smith continued in the Clintonian party. He was elected to the Assembly in 1791 and canvassed the state for Clinton in 1792 against John Jay. Smith died during the yellow fever epidemic in New York City in 1798 and is buried in Jamaica Cemetery, Jamaica, Queens, New York. The homonymous Unionist naval officer Melancton Smith was his grandson.

== Anti-Federalist Papers ==
Smith has been cited as the likely author of some of the more prominent Anti-Federalist essays written to encourage voters to reject ratification of the Constitution: the essays of Brutus and The Federal Farmer. While many believed Robert Yates to have been the author of the Brutus essays and Richard Henry Lee to have written the Federal Farmer, scholars have recently cast doubt on those attributions. In a computational analysis of the known writings of Smith, Yates, Lee, and other prominent Anti-Federalists, John Burrows concluded that Smith was the most likely author of both sets of essays. He found that "Brutus is consistently unlike... Yates's other writings." However, "the resemblance to Smith is strong and unfaltering." Furthermore, "[a]ll of the tests employed upheld Smith's authorship of Federal Farmer's papers, while the claim for Richard Henry Lee found no support at all." Michael Zuckert and Derek Webb, noting that it would be odd for one person to write two separate sets of essays covering similar topics and publishing at the same time, suggest that Smith instead collaborated closely with other Anti-Federalists. They find it more probable that he wrote one of the sets of essays, while another person or persons close to him wrote the other. A strong case has more recently been made for Elbridge Gerry as the Federal Farmer by John P. Kaminski and others.
