= The Complete Anti-Federalist =

Collection of 18th century arguments against a strong US central government

Spines of the seven-volume set

The Complete Anti-Federalist is a 1981 seven-volume collection of the scattered Anti-Federalist Papers compiled by Herbert Storing and his former student Murray Dry of the University of Chicago, who oversaw the completion of the project after Storing's death. Michael Lienesch treats Storing's compilation as "definitive," and many of the pamphlets and other materials included had not previously been published in a collection. The collection is noted for its sympathetic portrayal of the Anti-Federalists. The commentary underscores little-known similar positions and arguments made by the birth of the first two-party system in America. Storing points out that many "Anti-Federalists" actually considered themselves federalists in the sense that a federation is a structure over sovereign states.

== Background and legacy ==
Storing asserts that the name "Anti-Federalists" was offensive and was used to color any opponents to a strong central government as unpatriotic, when in fact many Anti-Federalists (the hyphen denotes a different meaning) were patriots of the Revolutionary War against Britain. The Anti-Federalists, Storing reveals, felt that young men like Alexander Hamilton, who was the main author of The Federalist Papers, were going against the ideals of the Revolution by substituting a potential monarchy (a president) in place of the individual freedom assured by the Articles of Confederation. The Anti-Federalists demanded and got a promise of a Bill of Rights so that the ratification of the 1787 constitution in 1789 would not be stillborn (a political reality reluctantly recognized by the "father" of the Constitution, James Madison). These collections are their unabridged arguments against a strong central government. Storing infers that there may be more pamphlets and writings in existence, but these were the only ones after nearly two decades of trying that he was able to tease out of private collections and the US government.

This is meant to be an authoritative edition. It includes all Anti-Federalist pamphlets that I have been able to find, all substantial newspaper essays and series of essays, some of the most important speeches by Anti-Federalists in ratifying conventions (though there is no claim of or need for comprehensiveness here), and some manuscript notes. About two-thirds of the items have never been printed since their original publication in 1787 and 1788, including a number of pieces that are of major importance in the Anti-Federal corpus... I have, of course, given a good deal of thought to the great length of this collection, though it was always understood that it would be more than one volume. I would have preferred it shorter; but there is, I think, no way to accomplish that that does not strike at the heart of the basic conception of this enterprise from the beginning: that all of the substantial Anti-Federalists pieces should be made available in their entirety and in an accurate text. Some of the most important series of essays, such as Centinel, and the Letters from the Federal Farmer, and Brutus, and A [Maryland] Federal Farmer, are very long. There is no possibility of omitting these or of abridging them without destroying a prime value of the collection.

The work was begun in 1963 and published in 1981 by the University of Chicago Press as a seven-volume set (ISBN 0-226-77573-9); Volume 1 is a work by Storing titled What the Anti-Federalists Were For: The Political Thought of the Opponents of the Constitution and Volume 7 is an index to the documents, which comprise Volumes 2 to 6. The original seven-volume edition comprised over 1840 pages and included the very long original essays in their entirety by The Federal Farmer, Centinel, Brutus and A Maryland Farmer which the author felt were essential.

Legal historian Paul Finkleman states that the collection provides a good reference to most of the anti-federalist materials and helps to rectify the fact that the arguments of those who opposed the Constitution have not remained as well-known.

An abridged edition of the work was published in 1985 (ISBN 9780226775654) as The Anti-Federalist: An Abridgment of The Complete Anti-Federalist. In 2008 the University of Chicago Press reprinted The Complete Anti-Federalist in three volumes (ISBN 9780226775661; E-book: ISBN 9780226775760) containing all of the contents of the original seven-volume set.
