= Massachusetts Compromise =

Historical event

The Massachusetts Compromise was a solution reached in a controversy between Federalists and Anti-Federalists over the ratification of the United States Constitution. The compromise helped gather enough support for the Constitution to ensure its ratification and led to the adoption of the first ten amendments, the Bill of Rights.

Anti-Federalists feared the Constitution would lead to an over-centralized government and diminish individual rights and liberties. They sought to amend the Constitution, particularly with a Bill of Rights as a condition before ratification. Federalists insisted that states had to accept or reject the document as written.

When efforts to ratify the Constitution encountered serious opposition in Massachusetts, two noted Anti-Federalists, John Hancock and Samuel Adams, helped negotiate a compromise. The Anti-Federalists agreed to support ratification, with the understanding that they would put forth recommendations for amendments should the document go into effect. The Federalists agreed to support the proposed amendments, specifically a bill of rights.

Following this compromise, Massachusetts voted to ratify the Constitution on February 6, 1788. Five states subsequently voted for ratification, four of which followed the Massachusetts model of recommending amendments along with their ratification.
