= Anti-Federalists =

1780s political movement in the US

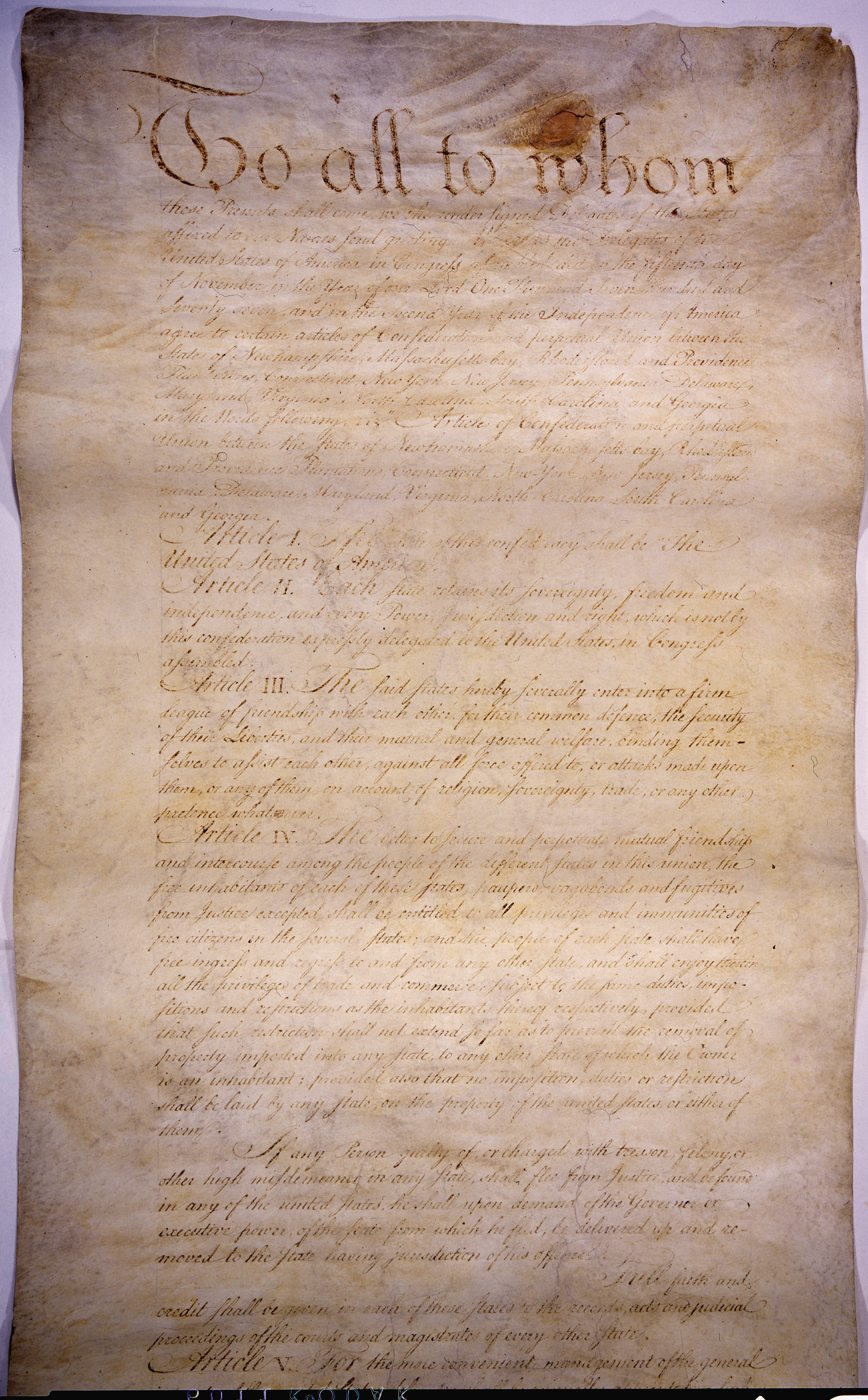
- The Articles of Confederation, predecessor to the U.S. Constitution and drafted from Anti-Federalist principles
- Leader: Patrick Henry
- Founded: 1787; 239 years ago
- Dissolved: 1789; 237 years ago
- Succeeded by: Anti-Administration party
- Ideology: Confederalism; Decentralization; Liberalism; Republicanism
- Political position: Left-wing

The Anti-Federalists were a late-18th-century group in the United States advancing a political movement that opposed the creation of a stronger federal government and which later opposed the ratification of the 1787 Constitution. The previous constitution, called the Articles of Confederation and Perpetual Union, gave state governments more authority. Led by Patrick Henry of Virginia, Anti-Federalists worried, among other things, that the position of president, then a novelty, might evolve into a monarchy. Though the Constitution was ratified and supplanted the Articles of Confederation, Anti-Federalists influence helped lead to the enactment of the Bill of Rights.

== Nomenclature ==
The name "Anti-Federalists" is a misnomer. It was imposed upon the movement by their opponents, the Federalists, and was supposed to mark them as men who "stood against the very political ideas they embraced". According to historian Carol Berkin:

Perhaps the nationalists' most brilliant tactic in the battle of ideas ahead of them, however, was their decision to call themselves "Federalists" and their cause, "Federalism". The men behind the Constitution were not, of course, federalists at all. They were advocates of a strong national government whose authority diminished the independence of the states. [...] By co-opting the name "Federalists", the pro-Constitution forces deprived their opponents of the ability to signal clearly and immediately what they stood for.

== Main beliefs ==
The Anti-Federalists were against the ratification of the Constitution for many reasons. The Anti-Federalists believed that the Constitution, as drafted, would lead to a loss of individual liberties, an erosion of state sovereignty, and the potential for the rise of tyranny. They advocated for a more decentralized form of government with greater protections for individual rights and stronger representation for the states. Principally, they were afraid that the national government would be too robust and would, thus, threaten states and individual rights. In the broad Anti-Federalist sense, they held that states should be significantly autonomous and independent in their authority, applying the right to self-administration in all significant internal matters without the unwanted interjections of the federal government. The Anti-Federalists debated with their Federalist colleagues, including Alexander Hamilton and James Madison, on the functional model and competencies of the planned federal government. The Anti-Federalists believed that almost all the executive power should be left to the country's authorities, while the Federalists wanted centralized national governments.

They also believed that a large central government would not serve the interests of small towns and rural areas, as opposed to the urban interests that most Federalist delegates aligned with. Generally, Anti-Federalists were more likely to be small farmers than lawyers and merchants and came from rural areas rather than the urban areas many federalists represented. In their journey to protect the interests of rural areas and farmers, the Anti-Federalists believed:

- The Constitution, as written, would be oppressive.
- The Constitution needed a Bill of Rights.
- The Constitution created a presidency so powerful that it would become a monarchy.
- The Constitution provided insufficient rights in the courts (e.g., no guarantee of juries in civil cases, nor that criminal case juries be local) and would create an out-of-control judiciary.
- The national government would be too far away from the people and thus unresponsive to the needs of localities.
- The Constitution would abrogate, at least in part, the power of the states.
- The federal government's powers to tax provided by the Constitution could be used to exploit citizens and weaken the power of the states.

The arguments of the Anti-Federalists influenced the formation of the Bill of Rights. As a response to the Anti-Federalists’ demands of a bill of rights to guarantee specific liberties, the Federalists agreed to consider amendments to be added to the new Constitution. This helped assuage its critics and ensure that the Constitution would be successfully ratified. James Madison, a Federalist at the time and the primary architect of the Constitution, introduced draft proposals of what would become the first ten amendments of the United States Constitution and advocated for their passage. In particular, the Tenth Amendment to the United States Constitution reinforced the reservation of the powers to the states or the people.

== History ==
During the American Revolution and its immediate aftermath, the term federal was applied to any person who supported the colonial union and the government formed under the Articles of Confederation. After the war, the group that felt the national government under the Articles was too weak appropriated the name Federalist for themselves. Historian Jackson Turner Main wrote, "to them, the man of 'federal principles' approved of 'federal measures', which meant those that increased the weight and authority or extended the influence of the Confederation Congress."

As the Federalists moved to amend the Articles, eventually leading to the Constitutional Convention, they applied the term anti-federalist to their opposition. The term implied, correctly or not, both opposition to Congress and unpatriotic motives. The Anti-Federalists rejected the term, arguing that they were the true federalists. In both their correspondence and their local groups, they tried to capture the term. For example, an unknown Anti-Federalist signed his public correspondence as "A Federal Farmer" and the New York committee opposing the Constitution was called the "Federal Republican Committee". However, the Federalists carried the day and the name Anti-Federalist forever stuck.

The Anti-Federalists were composed of diverse elements, including those opposed to the Constitution because they thought that a stronger government threatened the sovereignty and prestige of the states, localities, or individuals; those that saw in the proposed government a new centralized and "monarchic" power in disguise that would replicate the cast-off governance of Great Britain; and those who simply feared that the new government threatened their personal liberties. Some of the opposition believed that the central government under the Articles of Confederation was sufficient. Still others believed that while the national government under the Articles was too weak, the national government under the Constitution would be too strong. Another complaint of the Anti-Federalists was that the Constitution provided for a centralized rather than federal government (and in The Federalist Papers, James Madison admitted that the new Constitution had the characteristics of both a centralized and federal form of government) and that a truly federal form of government was a leaguing of states as under the Articles of Confederation.

During the period of debate over the ratification of the Constitution, numerous independent local speeches and articles were published all across the country. Initially, many of the articles in opposition were written under pseudonyms, such as "Brutus" (likely Melancton Smith), "Centinel" (likely Samuel Bryan), and "Federal Farmer." Eventually, famous revolutionary figures such as Patrick Henry came out publicly against the Constitution. They argued that the strong national government proposed by the Federalists was a threat to the rights of individuals and that the president would become a king. They objected to the federal court system created by the proposed constitution. Minority groups also contributed, such as Mercy Otis Warren who disguised herself as "A Colombian Patriot," thought to be Elbridge Gerry. Warren's most notable pamphlet discussed the treatment of minorities and American natural rights; this pamphlet was titled "History of the Rise, Progress, and Termination of the American Revolution". This produced a body of political writing; the best and most influential of these articles and speeches were gathered by historians into a collection known as the Anti-Federalist Papers in allusion to the Federalist Papers. The authors of these works did not organize together as a group. Instead, they used the medium of print to spread their ideas individually.

In many states the opposition to the Constitution was strong (although Delaware, Georgia, and New Jersey ratified quickly with little controversy), and in two states—North Carolina and Rhode Island—it prevented ratification until the definite establishment of the new government practically forced their adherence. Individualism was the strongest element of opposition; the necessity, or at least the desirability, of a bill of rights was almost universally felt. In Rhode Island, resistance against the Constitution was so strong that civil war almost broke out on July 4, 1788, when anti-federalist members of the Country Party led by Judge William West marched into Providence with over 1,000 armed protesters.

The Anti-Federalists played upon these feelings in the ratification convention in Massachusetts. By this point, five of the states had ratified the Constitution with relative ease, but the Massachusetts convention was far more disputed and contentious. After a long debate, a compromise (known as the "Massachusetts compromise") was reached. Massachusetts would ratify the Constitution with recommended provisions in the ratifying instrument that the Constitution be amended with a bill of rights. (The Federalists contended that a conditional ratification would be void, so the recommendation was the strongest support that the ratifying convention could give to a bill of rights short of rejecting the Constitution.)

Four of the next five states to ratify, including New Hampshire, Virginia, and New York, included similar language in their ratification instruments. As a result, shortly after the Constitution became operative in 1789, Congress sent a set of twelve amendments to the states. Ten of these amendments were immediately ratified and became known as the Bill of Rights, with one of the other two becoming the 27th Amendment—almost 200 years later. Thus, while the Anti-Federalists were unsuccessful in their quest to prevent the adoption of the Constitution, their efforts were not totally in vain. The Anti-Federalists thus became recognized as an influential group among the Founding Fathers of the United States.

With the passage of the Constitution and the Bill of Rights, the Anti-Federalist movement was exhausted. Some activists joined the Anti-Administration party that James Madison and Thomas Jefferson were forming about 1790–91 to oppose the policies of Treasury Secretary Alexander Hamilton. Hamilton's Pro-Administration faction became the Federalist Party, while the group opposing Hamilton soon became the Democratic-Republican Party. When Jefferson took office as the third president in 1801, he replaced Federalist appointees with Democratic-Republicans and sought to focus on issues that allowed the states to make more of their own decisions in matters. He also repealed the whiskey excise and other federal taxes, shut down some federal offices and broadly sought to change the fiscal system that Hamilton had created.

== Notable Anti-Federalists ==
- Patrick Henry, Virginia
- Samuel Adams, Massachusetts
- Joshua Atherton, New Hampshire
- George Mason, Virginia
- Richard Henry Lee, Virginia
- Robert Yates, New York
- James Monroe, Virginia
- Amos Singletary, Massachusetts
- John Hancock, Massachusetts
- Mercy Otis Warren, Massachusetts
- James Warren, Massachusetts
- George Clinton, New York
- Melancton Smith, New York
- James Winthrop, Massachusetts
- Luther Martin, Maryland
- Samuel Bryan, Pennsylvania

== See also ==
- Albany Antifederal Committee
- Anti-Federalist Papers
- The Complete Anti-Federalist
- Country Party (Rhode Island)
- States' rights
- New Federalism
- Subsidiarity
