= Anti-Federalist Papers =

Essays by American founding fathers opposed to the federal constitution

Anti-Federalist Papers is the collective name given to the works written by the Founding Fathers who were opposed to, or had objections concerning, the United States Constitution of 1787. Starting on 25 September 1787 (eight days after the final draft of the US Constitution) and through the early 1790s, these Anti-Federalists published a series of essays arguing against the ratification of the new Constitution. They opposed the implementation of a stronger federal government without protections for certain rights. The Anti-Federalist papers failed to halt the ratification of the Constitution, but they succeeded in influencing the first assembly of the United States Congress to draft the Bill of Rights. The essays were authored primarily by anonymous contributors using pseudonyms such as "Brutus" and the "Federal Farmer." Unlike the Federalists, the Anti-Federalists created their works as part of an unorganized group.

== History ==
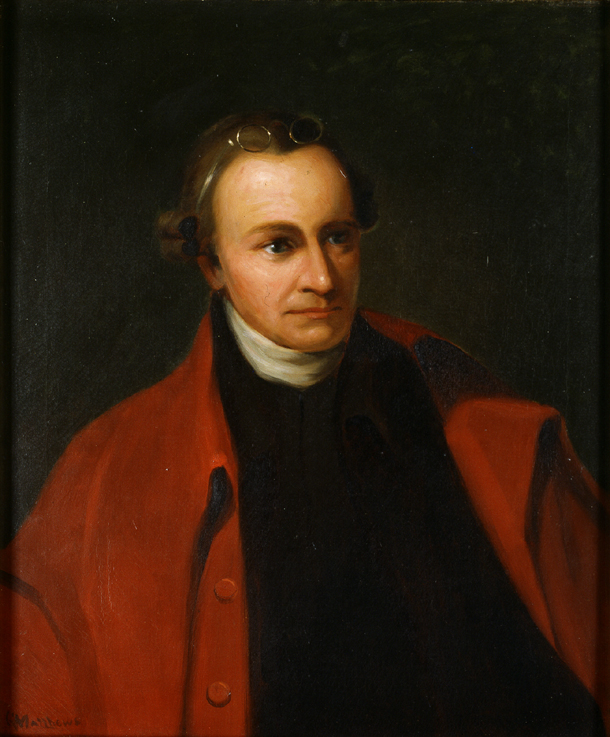
Patrick Henry, author of several of the Anti-Federalist papers

Following its victory against the British in the Revolutionary War, the United States was plagued by a variety of internal problems. The weak central government could not raise taxes to cover war debts and was largely unable to pass legislation. Many early American politicians and thinkers believed that these issues were the result of the Articles of Confederation, the first governing document of the United States. In 1787 a convention gathered in Philadelphia to attempt to amend it. Soon, however, the gathering shifted its focus to constructing a newer and more powerful Constitution for the fledgling country. Two main competing factions emerged, the Federalists and the Anti-Federalists. The former supported a more powerful central government while the latter opposed it.

During the lengthy and heated national debate following this convention, both groups wrote extensively in favor of their respective positions. The Anti-Federalist papers are a selection of the written arguments against the US Constitution by those known to posterity as the Anti-Federalists. As with the Federalist papers, these essays were originally published in newspapers. One of the most widely known are "a series of sixteen essays published in the New York Journal from October 1787 through April 1788 under the pseudonym 'Brutus'" (Melancton Smith).

== Structure and content ==
The Anti-Federalist papers were written over a number of years and by a variety of authors who utilized pen names to remain anonymous, and debates over authorship continue to this day. Unlike the authors of The Federalist Papers, a group of three men working closely together, the authors of the Anti-Federalist papers were not engaged in an organized project. Thus, in contrast to the pro-Constitution advocates, there was no one book or collection of Anti-Federalist Papers at the time. The essays were the product of a vast number of authors, working individually rather than as a group. Although there is no canonical list of Anti-Federalist authors, major authors include Cato (likely George Clinton), Brutus (likely either Melancton Smith, Robert Yates or perhaps John Williams), Centinel (Samuel Bryan), and the Federal Farmer (Elbridge Gerry, although previously thought to be Melancton Smith, Richard Henry Lee, or Mercy Otis Warren). Works by Patrick Henry and a variety of others are often included as well.

Until the mid-20th century, there was no united series of Anti-Federalist papers. The first major collection was compiled by Morton Borden, a professor at Columbia University, in 1965. He "collected 85 of the most significant papers and arranged them in an order closely resembling that of the 85 Federalist Papers". The most frequently cited contemporary collection, The Complete Anti-Federalist, was compiled by Herbert Storing and Murray Dry of the University of Chicago and published in 1981. At seven volumes and including many pamphlets and other materials not previously published in a collection, this work is considered, by many, to be the authoritative compendium on the publications.

Considering their number and diversity, it is difficult to summarize the contents of the Anti-Federalist papers. Generally speaking they reflected the sentiments of the Anti-Federalists, which Akhil Reed Amar of the Yale Law School generalized as: a localist fear of a powerful central government, a belief in the necessity of direct citizen participation in democracy, and a distrust of wealthy merchants and industrialists. Essays with titles such as "A Dangerous Plan of Benefit Only to The 'Aristocratick Combination'" and "New Constitution Creates a National Government; Will Not Abate Foreign Influence; Dangers of Civil War And Despotism" fill the collection, and reflect the strong feelings of the authors.

In the table below, a selection of Anti-Federalist papers have been contrasted with their Federalist counterparts.

Topics common to Anti-Federalist and Federalist papers
Subject	Anti-Federalist	Federalist
Need for stronger Union	John DeWitt No. I and II	Federalist No. 1–6
Bill of Rights	John DeWitt No. II	James Wilson, 10/6/87 Federalist No. 84
Nature and powers of the Union	Patrick Henry, 6/5/88	Federalist No. 1, 14, 15
Responsibility and checks in self-government	Centinel No. 1	Federalist No. 10, 51
Extent of Union, states' rights, Bill of Rights, taxation	Pennsylvania Minority: Brutus No. 1	Federalist No. 10, 32, 33, 35, 36, 39, 45, 84
Extended republics, taxation	Federal Farmer No. I and II	Federalist No. 8, 10, 14, 35, 36
Broad construction, taxing powers	Brutus No. VI	Federalist No. 23, 30–34
Defense, standing armies	Brutus No. X	Federalist No. 24–29
The judiciary	Brutus No. XI, XII, XV	Federalist No. 78–83
Government resting on the people	John DeWitt No. III	Federalist No. 23, 49
Executive power	Cato No. IV	Federalist No. 67
Regulating elections	Cato No. VII	Federalist No. 59
House of Representatives	Brutus No. IV	Federalist No. 27, 28, 52–54, 57
The Senate	Brutus No. XVI	Federalist No. 62, 63
Representation in House of Representatives and Senate	Melancton Smith, 6/20-6/27-88	Federalist No. 52–57, 62–63

== Legacy ==
The Anti-Federalists proved unable to stop the ratification of the US Constitution, which took effect in 1789. Since then, the essays they wrote have largely fallen into obscurity. The influence of their writing, however, can be seen to this day – particularly in the nature and shape of the United States Bill of Rights. Federalists, such as Alexander Hamilton, vigorously argued against its passage but were in the end forced to compromise.

The Massachusetts Compromise took place during the ratification process after 5 states had already ratified. Despite being the minority power, Anti-Federalists were able to create enough stir to prevent Massachusetts from ratifying the newly drafted Constitution. They agreed that there would need to at least be amendments made before their state would ratify the Constitution, leading to the beginning of the United States Bill of Rights. Other states with strong Anti-Federalist populations would follow this example, expanding this list of amendments to the first 10. The Bill of Rights was constructed specifically to quell the fears of the Anti-Federalists and to address their concerns. The Anti-Federalists feared that there were not enough checks and balances to protect the citizens from a governmental abuse of power. As such, the Anti-Federalists focused on explicitly listing out the individuals' rights and freedoms including free practice of religion, press, legal rights, and arms for protection from both their fellow man and government military occupation like what they faced during the Revolution. To prevent the federal government from assuming all unspecified powers, as the Anti-Federalists feared, the 10th and final Amendment in the Bill of Rights states that all powers not specified in the Constitution would be left to the States. These States' Rights would be a cornerstone issue for the entirety of United States history, from the treatment and freeing of slaves to the modern-day healthcare systems. The Anti-Federalists were not successful in stopping the ratification of the Constitution, but their actions still impact the Federal Government centuries after the writers of the Anti-Federalist papers are gone.

== See also ==
- Bibliography of the United States Constitution
- Anti-Federalists
- The Complete Anti-Federalist
- The Federalist Papers
- States' Rights
- Letters of Centinel
- List of pseudonyms used in the American Constitutional debates

== General and cited references ==
- The Documentary History of the Ratification of the Constitution, Vols. XIII–XVI. Ed. John P. Kaminski and Gaspare J. Saladino. Madison: State Historical Society of Wisconsin, 1981.
- The Anti-Federalist Papers. Morton Borden. Lansing: Michigan State University Press, 1965.
