= List of pseudonyms used in the American Constitutional debates =

During the debates over the design and ratification of the United States Constitution, in 1787 and 1788, a large number of writers in the popular press used pseudonyms. This list shows some of the more important commentaries and the (known or presumed) authors responsible for them. Note: the identity of the person behind several of these pseudonyms is not known for certain.

Pseudonym	Author	Notes
A.B.	Francis Hopkinson	Federalist.
Agrippa	James Winthrop	Eighteen essays appeared under this name in the Massachusetts Gazette between November 23, 1787 and February 5, 1788.
Alfredus	Samuel Tenney	Federalist.
Americanus	John Stevens, Jr.	
Aristides	Alexander Contee Hanson	Federalist.
Aristocrotis	William Petrikin	Anti-Federalist.
An Assemblyman	William Findley	
Brutus	Melancton Smith Robert Yates,	Anti-Federalist. After Marcus Junius Brutus, a Roman republican involved in the assassination of Caesar. Published sixteen essays in the New York Journal between October 1787 and April 1788. While Robert Yates from New York was commonly attributed as the author of Brutus on weak evidence, modern scholars, including the editors of the Documentary History of the Ratification of the Constitution, now believe that Melancton Smith was Brutus.
Candidus	Benjamin Austin	
Cato	George Clinton	Anti-Federalist.
Centinel	Samuel Bryan	Alternately, the author possibly was George Bryan.
Cincinnatus	Arthur Lee	After Lucius Quinctius Cincinnatus. Six essays addressed to James Wilson appeared under this name in the New York Journal beginning November 1, 1787.
A Citizen of America	Noah Webster	Federalist
A Citizen of New Haven	Roger Sherman	Federalist
A Columbian Patriot	Mercy Warren	Anti-Federalist
A Countryman	Roger Sherman (Federalist) DeWitt Clinton (Anti-Federalist)	The same pseudonym was used by both Federalists and Antis.
A Country Federalist	James Kent	Federalist
Crito	Stephen Hopkins	
Examiner	Charles McKnight	Federalist
Federal Farmer	Elbridge Gerry	Anti-Federalist. The Federal Farmer letters were frequently attributed to Richard Henry Lee, but modern scholarship has challenged Lee's authorship. Gordon Wood discredited the longstanding Lee attribution in the 1970s. John P. Kaminski proposed that Eldridge Gerry was the Federal Farmer in the 1990s. New discoveries by Kaminski and other modern scholars have confirmed the Gerry attribution. John P. Kaminski, “The Role of Newspapers in New York’s Debate Over the Federal Constitution,” in Stephen L. Schechter and Richard B. Bernstein, eds., New York and the Union (Albany, 1990), 285; 19 DHRC 203.
Foreign Spectator	Nicholas Collin	
Genuine Information	Luther Martin	Anti-Federalist
Harrington	Benjamin Rush	
Helvidius Priscus	James Warren	Anti-Federalist
An Independent Freeholder	Alexander White	
John DeWitt		Anti-Federalist. Pseudonym derives from Johan de Witt, Grand Pensionary of Holland.
A Landholder	Oliver Ellsworth	Federalist. Thirteen essays, some of the most widely circulated commentary on the proposed Constitution, appeared under this name, with the first publication coming in the Hartford papers. The essays were certainly written by one of the Connecticut delegates to the Convention, and Ellsworth is the only likely possibility.
Marcus	James Iredell	Federalist
Margery	George Bryan	
An Officer of the Late Continental Army	William Findley	
An Old Whig		Anti-Federalist.
A Pennsylvania Farmer	John Dickinson	Federalist (but didn't use this pseudonym during ratification)
Philadelphiensis	Benjamin Workman	
Philo-Publius	William Duer	Federalist
Phocion	Alexander Hamilton	Federalist (but didn't use this pseudonym during ratification)
A Plain Dealer	Spencer Roane	
A Plebeian	Melancton Smith	Anti-Federalist
Publius	Alexander Hamilton, James Madison, John Jay	After Publius Valerius Publicola. Under this name the three men wrote the 85 Federalist Papers. Hamilton had already used the name in 1778.
A Republican Federalist	James Warren	
Rough Hewer	Abraham Yates	Anti-Federalist
Senex	Patrick Henry?	Published an article in the Virginia Independent Chronicle, August 15, 1787, which was reprinted in four states. James McClurg wrote that the author was "supposed by some to be Mr. H---y."
The State Soldier	St. George Tucker	
Sydney	Robert Yates	Anti-Federalist
Timoleon		Anti-Federalist. After Timoleon of Corinth.
Tullius	George Turner?	

== Literature ==
- The Documentary History of the Ratification of the Constitution, Vols. XIII-XVI. Ed. John P. Kaminski and Gaspare J. Saladino. Madison: State Historical Society of Wisconsin, 1981.
