= Federalist No. 2 =

Federalist Paper by John Jay

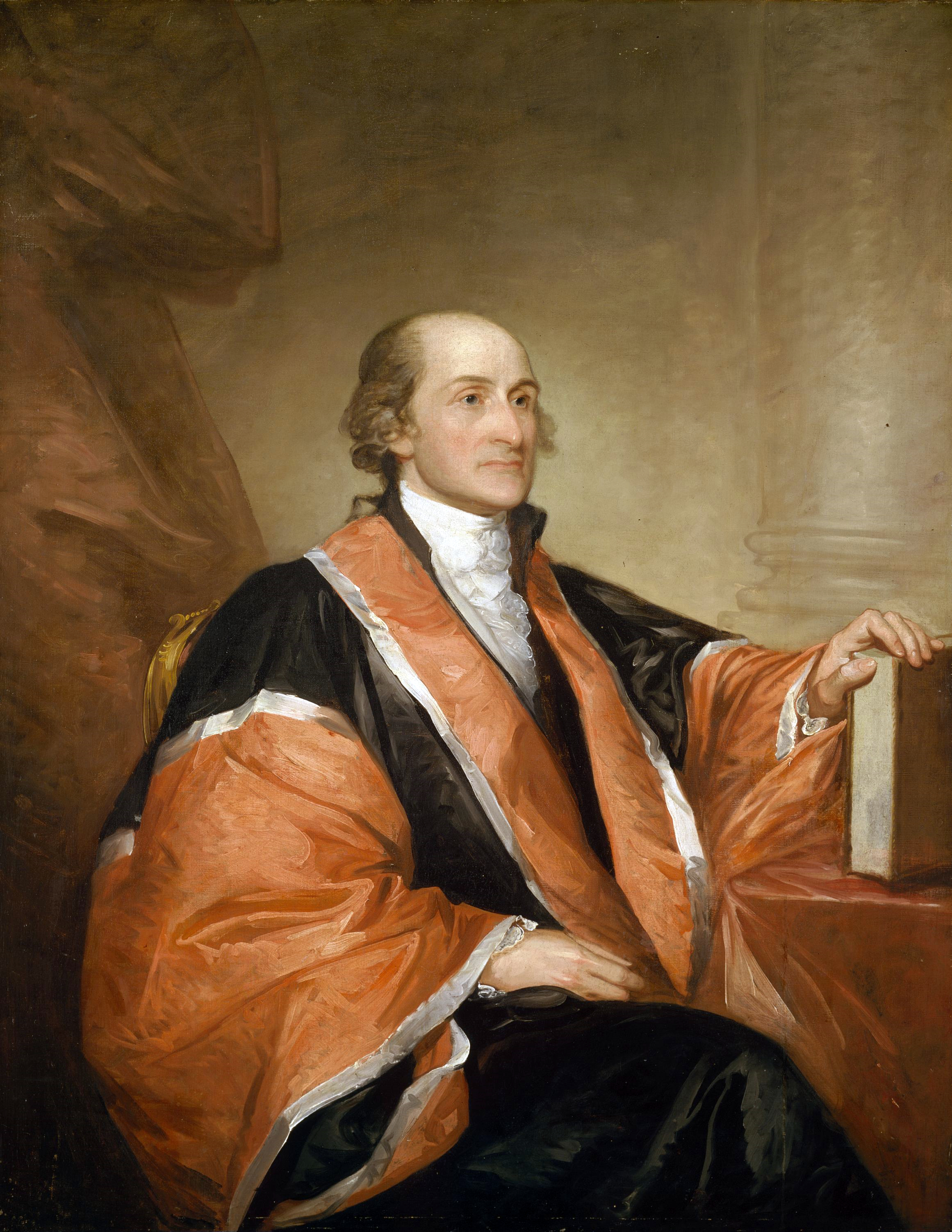
- John Jay, author of Federalist No. 2
- Author: John Jay
- Original title: Concerning Dangers from Foreign Force and Influence
- Language: English
- Series: The Federalist
- Publisher: The Independent Journal
- Publication date: October 31, 1787
- Publication place: United States
- Media type: Newspaper
- Preceded by: Federalist No. 1
- Followed by: Federalist No. 3
- Text: Federalist No. 2 at Wikisource

Federalist No. 2, titled "Concerning Dangers From Foreign Force and Influence", is a political essay written by John Jay. It was the second of The Federalist Papers, a series of 85 essays arguing for the ratification of the United States Constitution. The essay was first published in The Independent Journal (New York) on October 31, 1787, under the pseudonym Publius, the name under which all The Federalist Papers were published. Federalist No. 2 established the premise of nationhood that would persist through the series, addressing the issue of political union.

Federalist No. 2 defines Jay's concept of a single American nationality, which he sees as brought together by providence through shared culture and beneficial geography. Some of Jay's depictions of nationhood depend on historical revisionism, describing an idealist vision of American unity. His vision was a direct response to the Anti-Federalist claim that Americans were too different to form a single nation, and Jay maintained that Anti-Federalists did not understand or did not care about the fate of the American nation. Federalist No. 2 is limited in its criticism of opponents, instead expressing worry about the consequences should unity fail. It also made the only mention of natural rights in the Federalist Papers, an otherwise important concept that guided the American Revolution.

Federalist No. 2 was followed by three more essays that continued on the same topic. Since its publication, the conception of nationality presented in Federalist No. 2 has been a persistent issue in American politics. It relates directly to debates of naturalization and multiculturalism, and it was most directly challenged by the American Civil War that contradicted Jay's conception of unity.

== Summary ==
Jay begins by emphasizing the importance of deciding whether the states should be united or separate. He argues that popular opinion has always been in favor of unity until politicians challenged the idea. He then provides arguments that providence has intended for the states to be one nation, citing both physical and cultural contiguity. He also describes a shared political history in which the states entered into revolution and governance as one nation.

Jay turns to the method of governance between the states, describing the government to that point as one formed urgently in a time of conflict. He compares this to the process undertaken at the Constitutional Convention, which he describes as more unified and more carefully planned. He also credits the members of this convention as being highly qualified and motivated purely by "love for their country". Jay reminds the reader that their plan should not be blindly accepted or opposed but carefully considered, likening it to the debate following the First Continental Congress. He argues that every congress since then has supported unity and that this is the will of the people. He concludes that failure to support the proposed constitution would result in disunity.

== Background and publication ==
Federalist No. 2 was written by John Jay. Following the Constitutional Convention in 1787, Jay worked with James Madison and Alexander Hamilton to write a series of essays to explain the provisions of the Constitution of the United States and persuade New York to ratify it. They published these essays in New York newspapers under the shared pseudonym Publius. It was first published in the Independent Journal on October 31, 1787, followed by the Daily Advertiser on November 1 and the New-York Packet on November 2. Federalist No. 1, the only one of the Federalist Papers to have been released at this point, was only an introduction to the series. As such, Jay was tasked with first developing the idea of a national identity in Federalist No. 2. At the time Jay wrote Federalist No. 2, he was "America's leading foreign policy expert", which may have influenced his decision to write the essay on the subject of the advantages of unity between the states.

== Analysis ==
=== Nationhood and union ===
Federalist No. 2 was one of the early papers that addressed the issue of political union between the states that would persist throughout the Federalist Papers. It took an approach beyond the standard arguments of security and economics, arguing that Americans are a single ethnic group with shared ancestors, language, philosophy, and customs. Jay's analysis of what constituted a nation, closely resembled that used by political scientists many years later. Jay pointed to the contiguity of the states and the geographic features that facilitate contact between them as evidence for a destiny of unity, describing these advantages as the will of providence. He also argued that the states had since worked together successfully, citing the congresses that had formed since the First Continental Congress. Jay believed that the political ideas and identity of the American Revolution directly corresponded to those of the federalist movement. His hope was that the government could continue to function in a way similar to the Constitutional Convention, led by respected statesmen like George Washington. He emphasized a view that would be repeated throughout the Federalist Papers: that the people are almost unanimous in their ideals and that there is a single popular will that guides the United States.

Some of the arguments used by Jay depended upon historical revisionism and other controversial interpretations of American society, prioritizing persuasive effect over accuracy. His claims regarding a single ethnic and religious background were exaggerated, given the various national ancestries and religious denominations in colonial America, and his claim of political unity was challenged by the prominent Loyalist presence that existed even after the revolution. He ultimately considered these aspects to be secondary to the shared experience of colonial history and revolution as well as what he saw as a shared destiny. Jay also exaggerated the historical nature of American unity in Federalist No. 2, as the First Continental Congress included only 12 of the Thirteen Colonies, and the choosing of delegates for congresses had been done by the state legislatures rather than the people "as with one voice". Prior to ratification, the state governments were often in disunity and the people had very little say in federal government. Jay's appeal to nationhood resembled the nation that he wished to create rather than one that existed at the time.

=== Counterpoint to the Anti-Federalist Papers ===
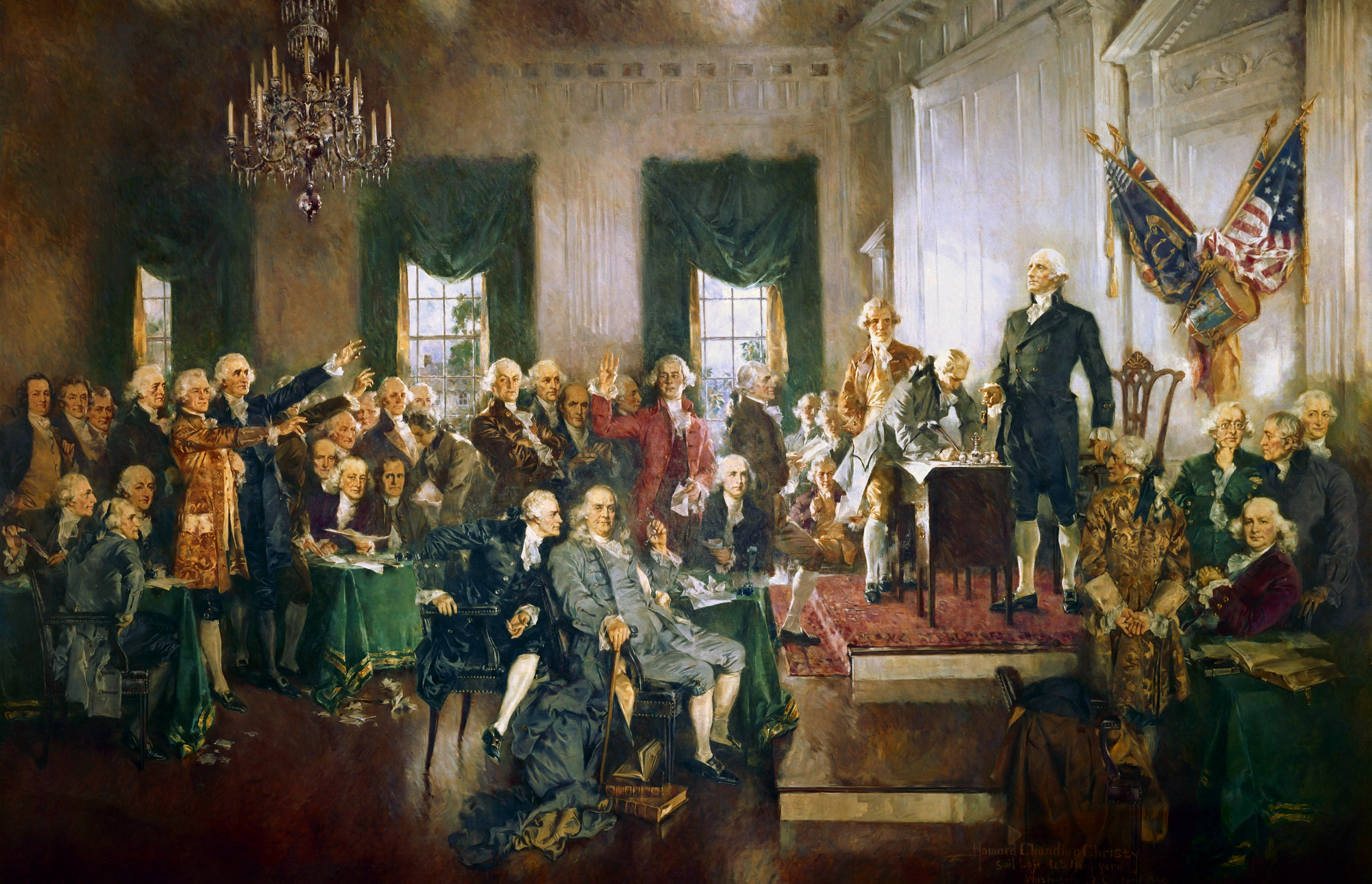
Jay argued that the Constitutional Convention provided a better forum for the creation of a government because it was convened in peacetime.

Federalist No. 2 established the main idea of the Federalist Papers that Americans were a national community with a common interest that necessitated unity. This idea was a direct response to one of the main ideas of the Anti-Federalist Papers, which argued that Americans were too different from one another to form a single nation. In particular, Jay seized upon the idea that different industries necessitated different cultures, arguing that it actually promoted trade between the states and made national identity stronger. Addressing Anti-Federalists, Jay argued that it was only recently that the idea of federalism was challenged, saying that it had "until lately been a received and uncontradicted opinion". He accused Anti-Federalists of being politicians that sought division rather than unity, describing them as only following personal interest or failing to understand the consequences of their actions. He compared the Anti-Federalists to the Loyalists of the revolution, arguing that their opposition to ratification could be likened to Loyalist opposition to independence.

Jay insisted that the Articles of Confederation were not sufficient for a national government, as they had been created in the midst of a war, and that the Constitutional Convention took place in a calmer national environment that allowed for deeper consideration. He worked on the same assumption as Hamilton that failure to ratify the constitution would guarantee disunity between the states. Anti-Federalists proposed amendment of the Articles of Confederation instead of total disunity, but the impression created by the Federalist Papers became widely accepted. This was a rhetorical strategy often used by Jay, in which he presented the issue as a leading question to present his answer as the only correct one.

=== Tone ===
Federalist No. 2 took a softer and more optimistic tone compared to Federalist No. 1, covering many of the same ideas in a way that sought to invite harmony among competing factions rather than to insist upon its claims. Jay's condemnation of his political opponents are left more vague than in Hamilton's previous essay, and they are seen as less of a threat to the union. By portraying them in this way, he is able to present himself as above the dispute rather than as a partisan attacking his opponents. Jay instead prioritized aesthetic, creating a picture of the states that lent itself to the idea of unity. When addressing the potential of failure, Jay approaches it with sorrow rather than the anger expressed by Hamilton. At the end of the essay, Jay invoked a quote from Henry VIII by William Shakespeare, creating a sense of foreboding at the thought of disunity that would persist through his contributions to the early Federalist Papers.

Jay's impression of the Founding Fathers in this essay is entirely uncritical, seeking to promote the cause of ratification with the reputation of his colleagues as capable leaders. He insists that any application of reason alone will find unanimous support for the constitution, and that the delegates of the Constitutional Convention were in possession of such reason. It also took a populist stance, appealing to the voice of the people over that of the state governments.

=== Natural rights ===
Federalist No. 2 is the only one of the Federalist Papers to make explicit reference to natural rights. This is a concept that was foundational to the philosophy of the Founding Fathers and the Constitution but was largely simplified in these essays for the sake of accessibility and brevity. In this context, Jay considered the ceding of some natural rights to be the cost for a functional government. Jay's thoughts on the willing sacrifice of rights suggests support for the arguments of Alexander Hamilton and James Madison that liberty had been too heavily emphasized during the American Revolution over governance.

Jay accepted that a government must be enforced, but he argued that it was the decision of Americans to enforce their own government through the American Revolutionary War that allows a people to engage in reflection to choose their own government and their national identity. The philosophical relationship between rights and governance received little attention in future Federalist Papers, as their interest was how government should use its powers rather than if it should have them.

== Aftermath ==
The arguments of Federalist No. 2 presented the basic assumptions that would underlie the ideas of the Federalist Papers going forward. It was directly followed by No. 3, No. 4, and No. 5, which all continued on the same subject. The themes of Americans as a singular people and the importance of unity among them were revisited by Hamilton in No. 12, Madison in No. 14, and Jay in No. 64.

The Naturalization Act of 1795 codified the idea of an American national identity, stipulating naturalization on the requirement that an applicant is "attached to the principles of the Constitution of the United States". The arguments of national unity and homogeneity in the United States would go on to be challenged by civil conflict in the United States with the onset of the American Civil War. The issue of a single national identity has been a persistent issue in American politics, with disputes considering whether such an identity can be based purely in civic culture and whether it can coexist with multiculturalism.
