= Federalist No. 23 =

Federalist Paper by Alexander Hamilton

- Alexander Hamilton, author of Federalist No. 23
- Author: Alexander Hamilton
- Original title: The Necessity of a Government as Energetic as the One Proposed to the Preservation of the Union
- Language: English
- Series: The Federalist
- Publisher: New York Packet
- Publication date: December 18, 1787
- Publication place: United States
- Media type: Newspaper
- Preceded by: Federalist No. 22
- Followed by: Federalist No. 24
- Text: Federalist No. 23 at Wikisource

Federalist No. 23, titled "The Necessity of a Government as Energetic as the One Proposed to the Preservation of the Union", is a political essay written by Alexander Hamilton and the twenty-third of The Federalist Papers. It was first published in New York newspapers on December 18, 1787, under the pseudonym Publius, the name under which all The Federalist Papers were published. This entry shifted the focus of the series, beginning an extended analysis of the proposed constitution and its provisions regarding commerce and national defense.

Federalist No. 23 argued against all forms of restriction on the federal government's ability to raise armies. It proposed that any federal government without the power to raise armies would not be able to fulfill its purpose, that the unforeseeable nature of threats require latitude for the government to respond, and that a centralized means of defense is more effective than entrusting individual states with national defense. Since the publication of Federalist No. 23 and the ratification of the constitution, the federal government of the United States has expanded significantly in scope, and the debate over governmental power in regard to national defense has persisted throughout American history.

== Summary ==
Publius identifies the principal purposes of the federal government: common defense, preservation of peace, regulation of commerce, and foreign affairs. He argues that the ability of the government to raise armies and navies should be unrestrained, as circumstances that demand them are unforeseeable and proper means must be provided for the government to reach the desired end. Publius suggests that such a rule was the intention of the Articles of Confederation, but that it was not given the means to carry it out as it was dependent on the goodwill of the states or the enforcement of unjust quotas for each state. Instead, he says that the federal government should be able to raise funds from the people to raise armies and navies.

Publius goes on to argue that there are benefits to empowering the federal government in regard to defense, saying that it allows a centralized organization and that it will defend the entire nation rather than individual states. He also says that it is inconsistent to give the federal government the responsibility for defense but to give the state governments the means of defense. Publius concludes by warning of the danger of an ill-equipped government and saying that any government without the means to enact defense is unable to fulfill its purpose.

== Background and publication ==
Federalist No. 23 was written by Alexander Hamilton. Following the Constitutional Convention in 1787, Hamilton worked with James Madison and John Jay to write a series of essays to explain the provisions of the Constitution of the United States and persuade New York to ratify it. They published these essays in New York newspapers under the shared pseudonym Publius. It was first published in the New-York Journal and the Independent Journal on December 18, 1787. It was then published in the Daily Advertiser and the New-York Packet on December 19. By the time The Federalist Papers were written, North America had been in a state of perpetual conflict for hundreds of years, including the American Indian Wars, the French and Indian War, and the American Revolutionary War, making national security a major concern for the United States.

== Analysis ==
Federalist No. 23 provided a review of the first 22 essays of The Federalist Papers and explained the sort of arguments that would next be explored. While the previous essays argued that the Articles of Confederation were insufficient, Federalist No. 23 shifted focus to the potential benefits of the proposed constitution.

Hamilton considered four subjects to be the "principal purposes" of forming a federal government: national defense, internal security, regulation of commerce, and foreign relations. He concerned himself with practical considerations over theoretical ones, and he was against any restriction on governmental power that might prevent it from fulfilling these purposes. Hamilton believed that this power should be unrestrained because the types of threats that a nation may face are unpredictable and that the United States would need to adapt its defense to respond to different situations.

Hamilton's approach suggested an outlook that political power should be defined by the ends it is meant to achieve rather than as enumerated powers, and that the restrictions desired by the Anti-Federalists would deprive the government of the means to achieve its ends. Hamilton's position in Federalist No. 23 was in direct contradiction with the constitution that The Federalist Papers championed, which was written to only include enumerated powers. These ideas were further challenged by the Bill of Rights upon its enactment, which codified specific powers that the federal government did not have.

Compared to the previous essays, Hamilton took a stronger stance on federal powers over defense in Federalist No. 23. While The Federalist Papers had previously argued in favor of separation of powers and limited government, Hamilton used this essay to argue that there should be no constitutional restrictions on the government's ability to ensure national defense. These powers were to include both defense itself as well as the power of taxation to fund it. Such was the insistence on this point that its justification was written entirely in capital letters and boldface.

Hamilton insisted that the federal government, as the body charged with overseeing the nation's defense, should also be the body that has the means to exercise defensive actions. With this notion, he disregarded the idea that states should act in defense of the nation on behalf of the federal government. Hamilton used the existing confederation of the states as an example of the states failing to work together when they are invested with power instead of a central state. He believed that over time, the federal government would become more powerful than local governments. With these issues, Hamilton determined that the United States must utilize the traditional means of government rather than try to invent a new mode of operations. The arguments in Federalist No. 23 invoked the ideas of Thomas Hobbes, arguing that the government must be given as much power as is necessary to carry out its duties.

== Aftermath ==
In the next 13 essays of The Federalist Papers, Nos. 24–36, Hamilton detailed the military and economic powers that he described in Federalist No. 23 and justified their use. In Federalist No. 34, Hamilton revisited his argument against restraining the government's defensive powers.

Brutus quoted Federalist No. 23 in his sixth entry of the Anti-Federalist Papers to prove that some federalists admit to the unrestrained power of the government under the proposed constitution. This quotation altered Hamilton's words, changing the conditional "if" to the declarative "that". Political philosopher Michael Zuckert described Federalist No. 23 as "one of the most probing discussions of constitutionalism in the history of political thought".

Since the ratification of the constitution, the role of the federal government has expanded significantly in scope. By the end of the 19th century, a civil service was established to regulate the exercise of government powers, and the federal government absorbed many responsibilities of state governments during the Great Depression in the 1930s. The extent of governmental power to ensure security has remained a major issue throughout American history, including defense from the United Kingdom in the War of 1812, continued conflict in the American Indian Wars, the internment of Japanese Americans during World War II, the threat of nuclear warfare during the Cuban Missile Crisis, and national security measures in response to the September 11 attacks.

Federalist No. 23 has been cited by several Supreme Court justices, including Hugo Black in United States v. South-Eastern Underwriters Ass'n (1944), Harold H. Burton in Lichter v. United States (1948), Charles Evans Whittaker in Kinsella v. United States (1960), William Rehnquist in Solorio v. United States (1988), and John Paul Stevens in Perpich v. Department of Defense (1990).
