= AP United States Government and Politics =

American education course and exam

Logo of AP U.S. Government and Politics as of 2025

Advanced Placement (AP) United States Government and Politics (often shortened to AP Gov or AP GoPo and sometimes referred to as AP American Government or simply AP Government) is a college-level course and examination offered to high school students through the College Board's Advanced Placement Program. This course surveys the structure and function of American government and politics that begins with an analysis of the United States Constitution, the foundation of the American political system. Students study the three branches of government, administrative agencies that support each branch, the role of political behavior in the democratic process, rules governing elections, political culture, and the workings of political parties and interest groups.

== Topic outline ==
The material in the course is composed of multiple subjects from the Constitutional roots of the United States to recent developments in civil rights and liberties. The AP United States Government examination covers roughly six subjects listed below in approximate percentage composition of the examination.

=== Foundations of American Democracy (15–22%) ===
- Considerations that influenced the formulation and adoption of the Constitution
- Separation of powers
- Federalism
- Theories of democratic government

=== Interactions Among Branches of Government (25–36%) ===
- The major formal and informal institutional arrangements of power; the Congress, the Presidency, the Bureaucracy, and the Federal Courts

=== Civil Liberties and Civil Rights (13–18%) ===
- The development of civil liberties and civil rights by judicial interpretation
- Knowledge of substantive rights and liberties
- The impact of the Fourteenth Amendment on the constitutional development of rights and liberties

=== American Political Ideologies and Beliefs (10–15%) ===
- Beliefs that citizens hold about their government and its leaders
- Processes by which citizens learn about politics
- The nature, sources, and consequences of public opinion
- The ways in which citizens vote and otherwise participate in political life
- Factors that influence citizens to differ from one another in terms of political beliefs and behaviors

=== Political Participation (20–27%) ===
- Political parties and elections
  - Functions
  - Organization
  - Development
  - Effects on the political process
  - Electoral laws and systems
- Interest groups, including political action committees (PACs)
  - The range of interests represented
  - The activities of interest groups
  - The effects of interest groups on the political process
  - The unique characteristics and roles of PACs in the political process
- The mass media
  - The functions and structures of the media
  - The impact of media on politics

=== Public Policy (Part of the Units, embedded within all five units) ===
- Public policy making in a federal system
- The formation of policy agendas
- The role of institutions in the enactment of policy
- The role of the bureaucracy and the courts in policy implementation and interpretation
- Linkages between policy processes and the following:
  - Political institutions and federalism
  - Political parties
  - Interest groups
  - Public opinion
  - Elections
  - Policy networks

== Required Supreme Court cases and Foundation Documents ==
=== Supreme Court cases ===
Starting from 2019 Administration of the Test, the College Board requires students to know 15 Supreme Court cases. After the Supreme Court's decision in Dobbs v. Jackson Women's Health Organization, Roe v. Wade was removed from the required case list. The 14 required Supreme Court cases are listed below:

Supreme Court case	Year	Significance	Law Applied
Marbury v. Madison	1803	Established the principle of judicial review empowering the Supreme Court to nullify an act of the legislative or executive branch that violates the Constitution	U.S. Const. art. I; U.S. Const. art. III, § 2; Judiciary Act of 1789 § 13
McCulloch v. Maryland	1819	Established supremacy of the U.S. Constitution and federal laws over state laws	U.S. Const. art. I, § 8, cl. 1, 18
Schenck v. United States	1919	Speech creating a “clear and present danger” is not protected by the First Amendment	U.S. Const. amend. I; 50 U.S.C. § 33
Brown v. Board of Education	1954	Race-based school segregation violates the equal protection clause	U.S. Const. amend. XIV
Baker v. Carr	1961	Opened the door to equal protection challenges to redistricting and the development of the “one person, one vote” doctrine by ruling that challenges to redistricting did not raise “political questions” that would keep federal courts from reviewing such challenges	U.S. Const. amend. XIV; U.S. Const. art. III; 42 U.S.C. § 1983; Tenn. Const. art. II
Engel v. Vitale	1962	School sponsorship of religious activities violates the establishment clause	U.S. Const. amend. I
Gideon v. Wainwright	1963	Guaranteed the right to an attorney for the poor or indigent in a state felony case	U.S. Const. amends. VI, XIV
Tinker v. Des Moines Independent Community School District	1969	Public school students have the right to wear black armbands in school to protest the Vietnam War	U.S. Const. amends. I, XIV; 42 U.S.C. § 1983
New York Times Co. v. United States	1971	Bolstered the freedom of the press, establishing a “heavy presumption against prior restraint” even in cases involving national security	U.S. Const. amend. I
Wisconsin v. Yoder	1972	Compelling Amish students to attend school past the eighth grade violates the free exercise clause	U.S. Const. amend. I; Wis. Stat. § 118.15 (Wisconsin Compulsory School Attendance Law)
Shaw v. Reno	1993	Majority-minority districts, created under the Voting Rights Act of 1965, may be constitutionally challenged by voters if race is the only factor used in creating the district	U.S. Const. amends. XIV
United States v. Lopez	1995	Congress may not use the commerce clause to make possession of a gun in a school zone a federal crime	U.S. Const. art. I, § 8, cl. 3
McDonald v. Chicago	2010	The Second Amendment right to keep and bear arms for self-defense is applicable to the states	U.S. Const. amend. II, XIV
Citizens United v. Federal Election Commission	2010	Political spending by corporations, associations, and labor unions is a form of protected speech under the First Amendment	U.S. Const. amend. I, Bipartisan Campaign Reform Act

=== Foundation Documents ===
College Board requires students to memorize foundational documents. The nine documents are listed below:

Foundation Document	Year
The Declaration of Independence	1776
The Articles of Confederation	1781
Federalist No. 10	1787
Brutus No. 1	1787
Federalist No. 51	1788
Federalist No. 70	1788
Federalist No. 78	1788
The Constitution of the United States	1789
Letter from Birmingham Jail	1963

== Exam ==
The Multiple-Choice section is analytical and the Free-Response questions are as follows.

- Section I: Multiple-Choice (80 minutes, 55 questions, 50% of Total Exam Scores)
- Section II: Free-response (100 minutes, 4 questions, 50% of Total Exam Scores)

Question #	1	2	3	4
Question Type	Concept Application	Quantitative Analysis	Supreme Court Case(s) Comparison	Argumentative Essay
Time Suggested	20 minutes	20 minutes	20 minutes	40 minutes
Percentage of Total Exam Score	Each free response question counts as 12.5% of the exam score.			

=== Grade distribution ===
The grade distributions since 2007 were:

Grade distribution
Year	1	2	3	4	5	% of scores 3 or higher	Mean score	Standard deviation	Number of students
2007	16.10%	32.10%	26.90%	18.90%	6.00%	51.80%	2.67	1.13	160,978
2008	23.70%	25.80%	25.20%	13.10%	12.10%	50.50%	2.64	1.3	177,522
2009	20.30%	24.20%	25.40%	17.00%	13.10%	55.50%	2.78	1.3	189,998
2010	24.70%	24.00%	25.40%	13.30%	12.50%	51.30%	2.65	1.32	211,681
2011	24.10%	24.30%	25.10%	13.90%	12.60%	51.60%	2.67	1.32	225,837
2012	23.30%	24.50%	24.80%	14.90%	12.50%	52.20%	2.69	1.32	239,513
2013	23.50%	24.80%	26.10%	14.30%	11.30%	51.60%	2.65	1.29	255,758
2014	24.60%	24.70%	26.40%	12.50%	11.90%	50.70%	2.62	1.3	271,043
2015	27.00%	25.00%	24.70%	13.50%	9.70%	48.00%	2.54	1.28	282,571
2016	25.20%	24.00%	24.90%	13.50%	12.30%	50.80%	2.64	1.32	296,108
2017	26.10%	24.60%	25.70%	12.40%	11.10%	49.30%	2.58	1.3	319,612
2018	22.60%	24.40%	26.40%	13.30%	13.30%	53.00%	2.7	1.31	326,392
2019	20.10%	24.80%	29.80%	12.40%	12.90%	55.10%	2.73	1.27	314,825
2020	20.50%	22.00%	25.50%	16.50%	15.50%	57.50%	2.85	1.34	293,196
2021	23.80%	25.80%	26.90%	11.60%	12.00%	50.40%	2.62	1.29	283,353
2022	25.70%	25.70%	25.80%	10.90%	12.00%	48.60%	2.58	1.3	298,118
2023	26.80%	24.00%	25.10%	11.30%	12.80%	49.20%	2.59	1.33	329,132
2024	8.90%	18.10%	23.70%	25.00%	24.30%	73.00%	3.38	1.27	350,257
2025	9.90%	18.40%	23.20%	24.80%	23.70%	71.70%	3.34	1.28	387,973
2026	8%	16%	25%	28%	23%	76%			430,000
