= Federalist No. 3 =

Federalist Paper by John Jay

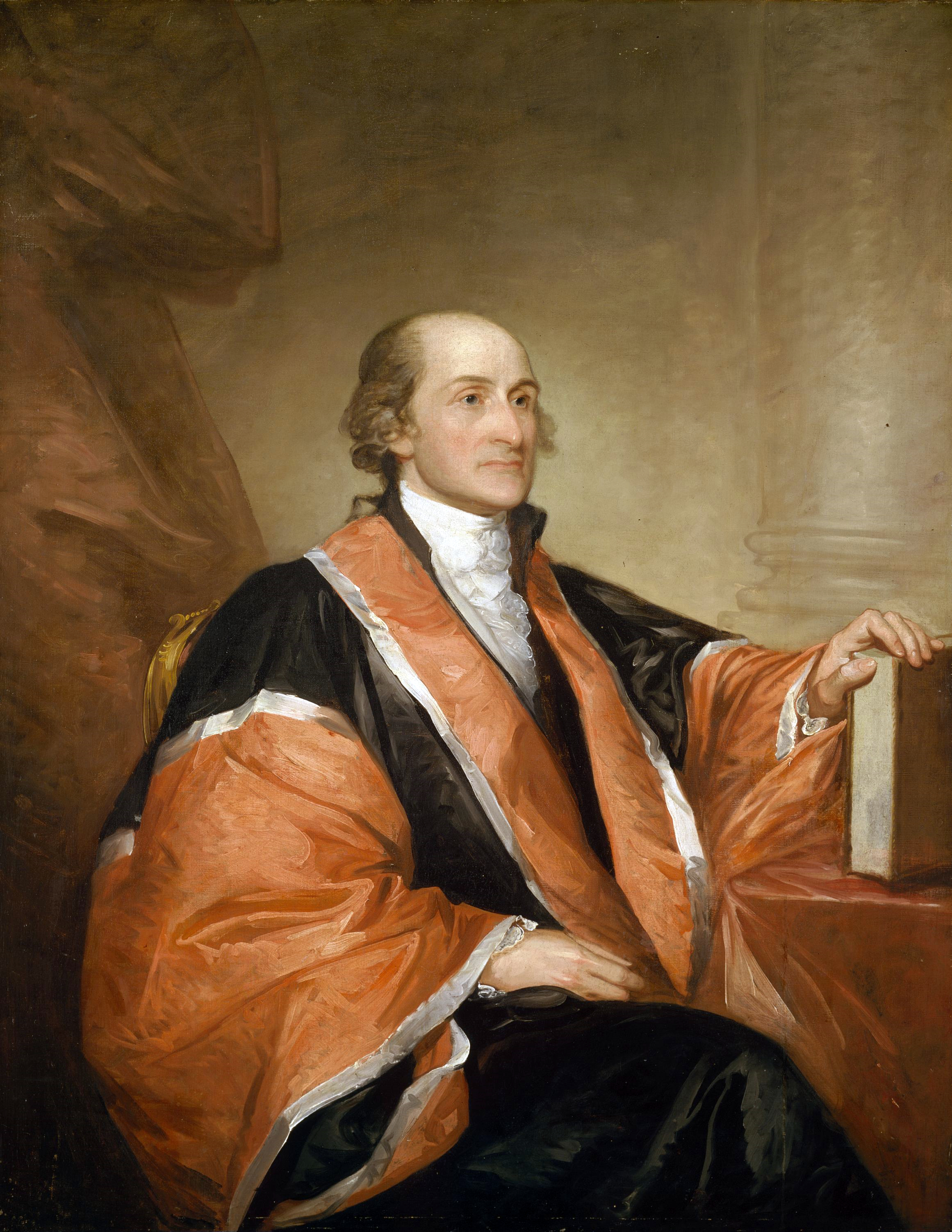
- John Jay, author of Federalist No. 3
- Author: John Jay
- Original title: The Same Subject Continued: Concerning Dangers from Foreign Force and Influence
- Language: English
- Series: The Federalist
- Publisher: The Independent Journal
- Publication date: November 3, 1787
- Publication place: United States
- Media type: Newspaper
- Preceded by: Federalist No. 2
- Followed by: Federalist No. 4
- Text: Federalist No. 3 at Wikisource

Federalist No. 3, titled "The Same Subject Continued: Concerning Dangers from Foreign Force and Influence", is a political essay by John Jay, the third of The Federalist Papers. It was first published in The Independent Journal on November 3, 1787, under the pseudonym Publius, the name under which all The Federalist papers were published. It is the second of four essays by Jay on the benefits of political union in protecting Americans against foreign adversaries, preceded by Federalist No. 2 and followed by Federalist No. 4 and Federalist No. 5.

Federalist No. 3 considers whether a federal government is better equipped to manage foreign policy and prevent war than state governments. Jay argues that a federal government has advantages in that it can select better statesmen from a larger population and that it can apply treaties more consistently than individual states. He also argues that state governments are more likely to act provocatively when their states are at the center of a conflict, while the federal government can give more even consideration of an issue.

== Summary ==
Jay begins by arguing that the people ultimately make the best decisions for their own governance, and he says that union of the states is an example of such a decision. He says that safety of the people is the first responsibility of government and that union is the best way to guarantee safety. He explains that the most wars are caused by violations of treaties or acts of violence and says that individual states are more likely to engage in these causes than an empowered national government. He argues that this is a concern because the United States regularly engages with several powerful nations with the capacity to wage war.

Jay lists four reasons why he believes a national government is better equipped for handling diplomacy. First, he argues that the men chosen to run the national government would be more qualified than those running the states, as they would have to stand out amongst a much larger group of candidates across the country. He then argues that a strong national government could better preserve peace, stating that a federal government would be less likely to provoke other nations to attack due to a consistency in the application of treaties. He also argues that states directly involved in disputes may be disposed to act irrationally out of passion and that a national government is necessary to temper this response. Finally, he argues that should the people within a state support such irrational action, a national government would be immune to this popular will.

Jay then says that the same arguments apply to acts of violence on national borders. He says that some of the American Indian Wars had been caused by state governments, but none had been caused by the national government. He expresses concern of similar conflict on the borders with Britain and Spain. Jay concludes by arguing that, in the event of an international conflict, a foreign power would be more likely to come to terms with a united America. He observes that, in 1685, Genoa was forced to send its national leadership to France to ask pardon from Louis XIV; Jay questions whether France would have demanded such tribute from any "powerful nation." Thus a "strong united nation" could better preserve the peace since it would find it easier to settle causes of war.

== Background and publication ==
Federalist No. 3 was written by John Jay. Following the Constitutional Convention in 1787, Hamilton worked with James Madison and Alexander Hamilton to write a series of essays to explain the provisions of the Constitution of the United States and persuade New York to ratify it. They published these essays in New York newspapers under the shared pseudonym Publius. It was first published in the Independent Journal on November 3, 1787, followed by the Daily Advertiser on November 5 and the New-York Packet on November 6. Federalist No. 3 directly follows the arguments of Federalist No. 2, building on its description of historical unity between the states to argue that it benefits national security. As with Federalist No. 2, Jay assumes that failure to ratify the constitution will result in disunion between the states. Anti-Federalists generally supported union, even when opposing the Constitution. At the time he wrote these essays, Jay was the nation's leading diplomat and would have been involved with diplomatic issues facing the United States.

== Analysis ==
Federalist No. 3 argued that the foreign policy of a unitary federal government would be superior to those of individual state governments. Jay believed that a union would protect the states and that individual states would be more likely to provoke war than a single national government. At the time the Federalist Papers were written, international law had not developed beyond treaties and philosophical concepts of natural law. To discuss the law of war, Jay divided it into just war and unjust war, focusing primarily on the causes of just war and how a national government would prevent them. He described the primary justifications of war as violations of treaties and acts of violence, and he argued that any one state on its own was more likely to provoke one of these causes than a national government.

=== Advantages of federal government ===
Federalist No. 3 presented the argument that a national government would be advantageous because it would be better equipped to engage in diplomacy. Jay argued that the combined population of the 13 states would provide more options to appoint the most skilled politicians, while individual states may not always be able to find experienced statesmen capable of diplomacy from their own populations. This aligned with Madison's opinion that a virtuous government can be created if it allows for sufficient representation. Jay also believed that consistent practice of international law and custom was necessary to prevent war and that it would take a federal government to ensure this. He saw it as a responsibility of the federal judiciary to ensure that this consistency occurred. His concern was that the states would interpret treaties differently, depending on their own legal systems and their own interests, increasing the likelihood of conflict with a foreign nation. Under a strong national government, a single foreign policy could be implemented for all of the states.

Federalist No. 3 established a clear objective for the government, describing safety as the first priority for a free people. In particular, he worried of "dangers from foreign arms and influence". As with his other essays in the Federalist Papers, Jay ended Federalist No. 3 by playing to the fears of Americans. In this case, he warned of the power of larger nations such as Britain and Spain would have over the states if they were to be divided. Jay's prominent involvement in American foreign policy point positioned him to have a broad understanding of foreign threats to the United States.

=== Decision making ===
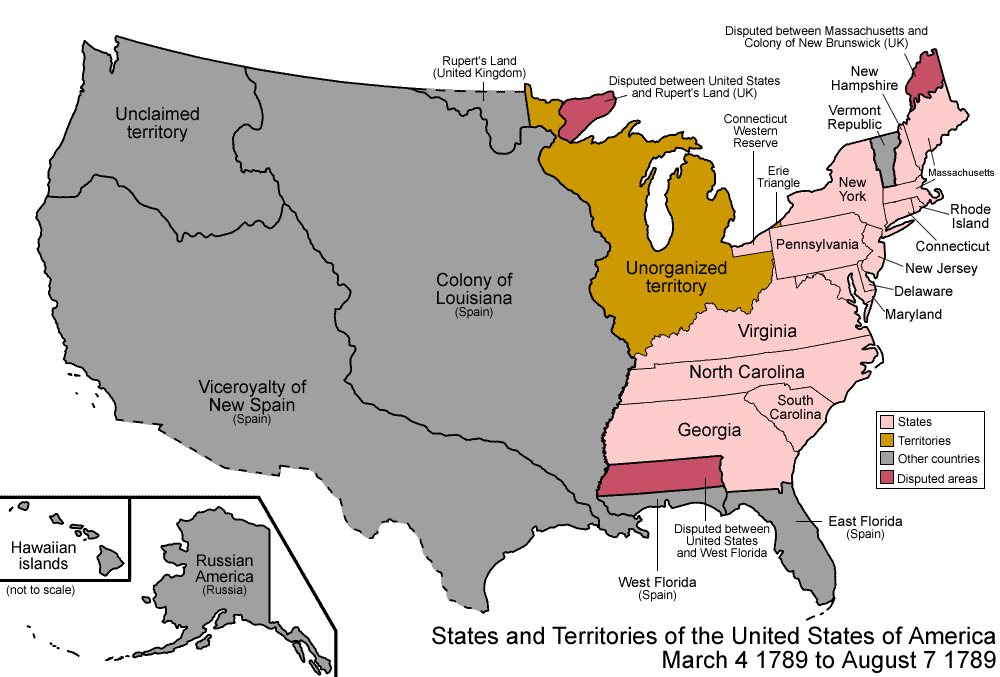
United States territory in 1789: the United States shared borders and disputed territory with the British Empire and the Spanish Empire.

Jay argued in Federalist No. 3 that limiting diplomatic powers to a national government with representatives from various states would prevent individual states from taking rash action based on their own involvement in a dispute. He invoked concepts relating to the motives of different governments and the opportunities that they have to act on them. Instead of challenging the judgement of foreign governments, Jay asked his readers to look inward and consider what foreign policy would express virtue. Jay believed that a national government would be better equipped in both cases, in that its motives would not be clouded by direct involvement, while it would have greater opportunity to resolve conflict due to its increased scope. Conversely, the motives of individual states risked war if they were given powers over diplomacy, and they lacked the opportunities to prevent it.

Jay emphasized the threat he perceived from border states that were in proximity with the British Empire, the Spanish Empire, and the Indigenous Nations. He feared that violent incidents on national borders would provoke war, arguing that the judgement of a national government was needed to prevent and address such incidents. Jay warned of a passionate foreign policy and expressed his preference for a more calculated approach. This position was consistent with the general distrust of state governments that would persist throughout the Federalist Papers. Jay feared unprovoked attack on Indigenous Nations and argued that it would not be in the states' interest. State governments had already restricted the rights of British subjects and intruded on the territory of the Indigenous Nations in ways that could create conflict with these foreign nations. The constitution would give the federal government power to regulate such activity, effectively resolving diplomatic conflict of the states with foreign powers and with one another.

Federalist No. 3 introduced a theme that recurred throughout the Federalist Papers, expressing the belief that the people of a nation will generally make reasoned decisions about their own government, but that this is sometimes interrupted by brief periods where popular opinion allows poor decisions to prevail. In this context, Jay doubted that popular will was capable of considering foreign policy issues, and he indicated that it would be better addressed by a professional class of diplomats. Jay also applied this contrast to the state governments, arguing that the federal government would be more reasoned in its approach, as it would consider the interest of all states and avoid irrational decisions propelled by the passion of a state's population. To this end, a federal government allows for neutral parties from other states to address conflicts, rather than have the affected state react unilaterally in a way that may be harmful.

== Aftermath ==
Jay continued his treatment of this subject in No. 4 and No. 5, and the arguments that a united nation would have access to better statesmen would be revisited by James Madison in No. 10. Jay remained committed to his belief that the federal judiciary would determine how to consistently follow international law when he served as Chief Justice of the United States two years later. Over the following century, Jay's warning about provoking Indigenous Nations went unheard, and frequent military conflicts occurred.

The role of local and state affairs in foreign policy has remained a concern in American foreign policy. Interactions between state governments and Mexican nationals have caused diplomatic conflicts with Mexico continuing into the 21st century, particularly in the context of illegal immigration to the United States.
