= Eleazer Oswald =

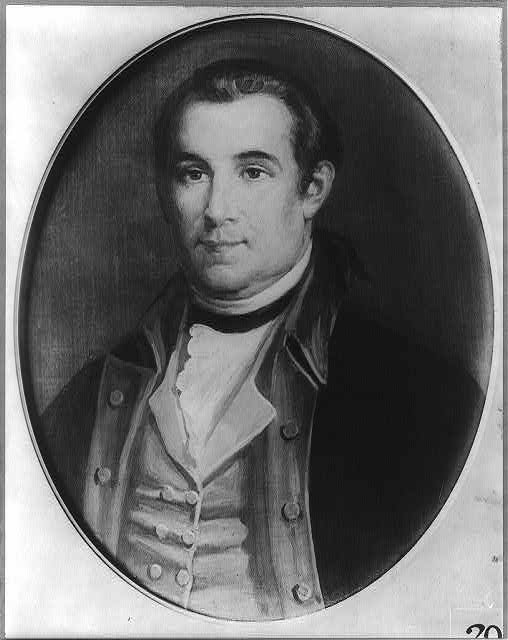
- Eleazer Oswald
- Born: 1755; England
- Died: 30 September 1795 (aged 39–40); New York City, New York
- Military career
- Allegiance: United States; France
- Branch: Artillery
- Service years: (United States) 1775–1778; (France) 1792–1795
- Rank: (United States) Lieutenant Colonel; (France) Colonel
- Conflicts: American Revolutionary War; Battle of Quebec; Danbury Raid; Battle of Monmouth; French Revolutionary Wars; Battle of Jemappes

Eleazer Oswald (baptized bp 2 February 1750/51 – 30 September 1795) was born at Falmouth, Cornwall, in England, but moved to Virginia as a young man. He became apprenticed to a printer, John Holt of Williamsburg, Virginia, and married the man's daughter, Elizabeth Holt. In the American Revolutionary War he immediately threw in his lot with the American colonists. He participated in Benedict Arnold's expedition to Quebec in 1775 and was captured. After a prisoner exchange, he was promoted to lieutenant colonel of artillery in January 1777. He performed notable service during the Danbury Raid in Connecticut during April 1777. At the Battle of Monmouth in June 1778 he distinguished himself while playing a major role in the engagement.

After resigning from the army in a dispute over seniority, Oswald returned to a career in publishing and journalism. Over the next decade he published newspapers in Baltimore, Philadelphia, and New York. In 1792 he went to France where he joined the French Revolution and assumed command of an artillery unit as colonel. After fighting at Jemappes he went on a secret mission to Ireland. He returned to New York in 1795 and died in an outbreak of Yellow Fever.

== Apprentice and soldier ==
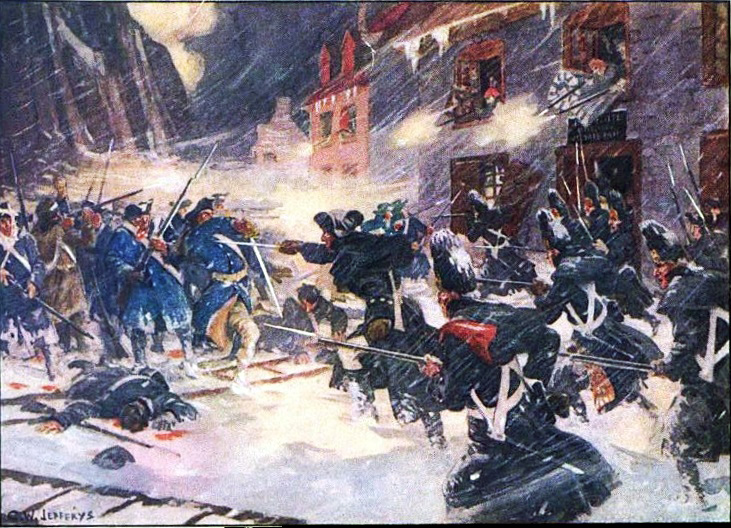
Oswald was captured at the Battle of Quebec

Born at Falmouth, Cornwall, in England, in 1755, Oswald was the son of a ship captain Eleazer Oswald and his wife Rebekah Thomas. His father disappeared at sea when he was in his early teens. He was related to merchant Richard Oswald who later became the British commissioner for the Peace of Paris in 1783. Oswald traveled to America around 1770 and became involved in the patriot cause. He eventually settled in Connecticut. He became apprenticed to New York printer John Holt. Oswald married Holt's daughter Elizabeth (d. 1797) and their oldest son John Holt Oswald was born around 1777. Oswald married Elizabeth in New York City on 2 January 1772.

Immediately after the Battles of Lexington and Concord Oswald joined the American army. With Benedict Arnold he participated in the Capture of Fort Ticonderoga on 10 May 1775. Oswald went with Benedict Arnold's expedition to Quebec in 1775 as one of five unattached volunteers. The other four were Aaron Burr, Matthias Ogden, Charles Porterfield, and John McGuire. On the night of 31 December 1775, Oswald took part in the Battle of Quebec. Benedict Arnold and Oswald accompanied the 25-man vanguard of Arnold's 600-strong column. He was wounded and captured in the battle. He was not exchanged until 10 January 1777 when he received a commission as lieutenant colonel in John Lamb's 2nd Continental Artillery Regiment. He performed noteworthy service at Compo Hill during the Danbury Raid. During the action, Lamb's three-gun battery made a valiant attempt to stop a British bayonet charge.

Oswald served as Charles Lee's senior artillery officer at the Battle of Monmouth on 28 June 1778. Under his authority were Captain Thomas Wells of the 3rd Continental Artillery Regiment, two guns, Captain David Cook of the 3rd Artillery, two guns, Captain Thomas Seward of the 3rd Artillery, two guns, Captain Thomas Randall of the 2nd Artillery, two guns, and four guns of the 3rd Artillery attached to Charles Scott's brigade. Wells was attached to William Grayson's brigade, Cook to James Mitchell Varnum's brigade (under John Durkee), Seward to Anthony Wayne's brigade, and Randall to William Maxwell's brigade.

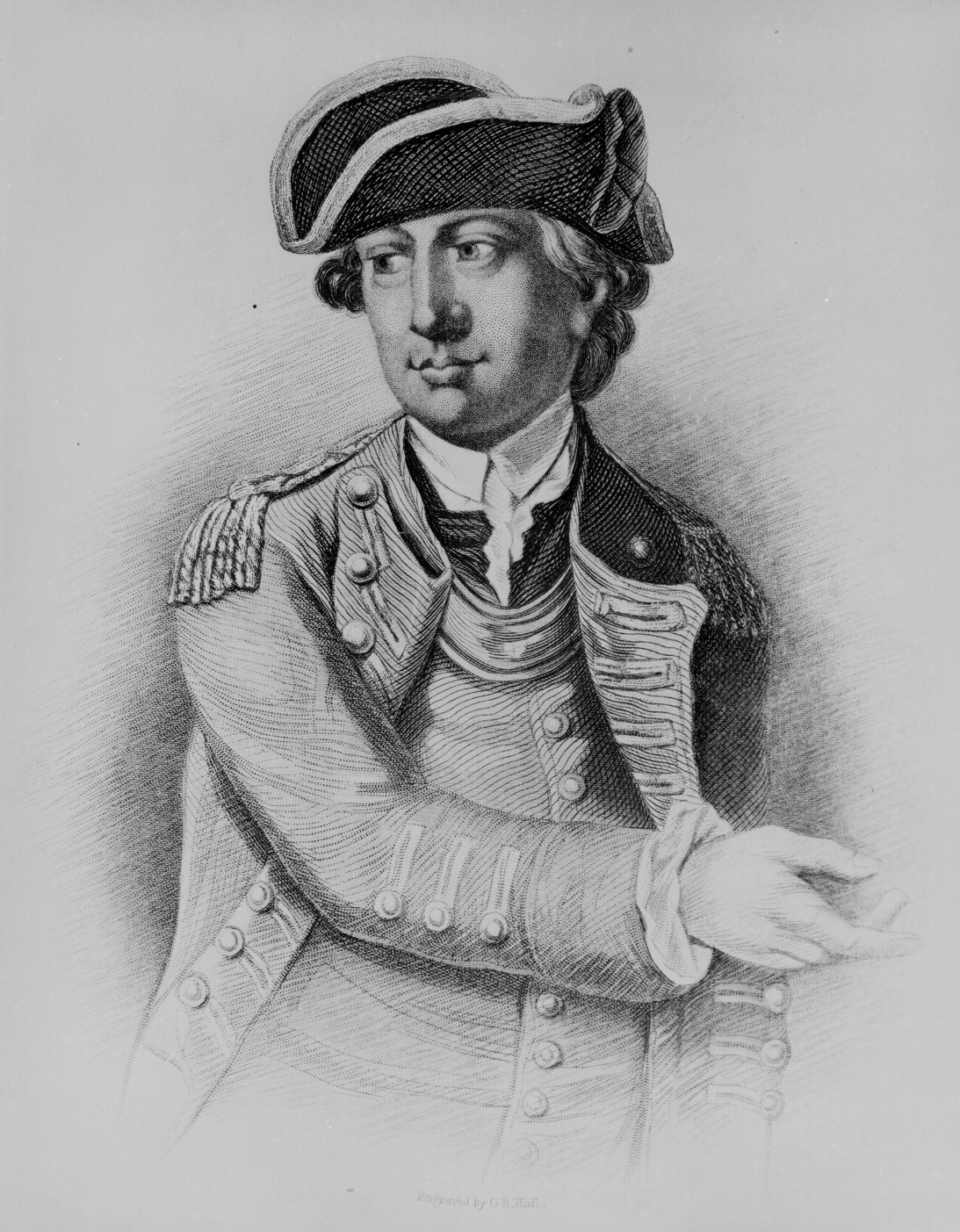
Charles Lee

Since Lee had expressed doubts about the wisdom of harassing the retreat of Sir Henry Clinton's British army, George Washington placed the American advance guard under the command of Gilbert Motier, marquis de La Fayette. However, on 25 June Lee changed his mind and asked for the command. Since Lee was his second-in-command, Washington reinforced the advance guard to 5,500 troops and put Lee in charge. On 27 June Washington ordered Lee to attack Clinton's rear guard the next morning.

On 28 June, Lee's first units began to march at 7:00 AM. When they reached the bridge across Spottswood Middle Brook (West Morass), conflicting reports caused the column to delay. Eventually at 9:00 AM, Lee sent Wayne forward with an ad hoc force consisting of four guns under Oswald, Grayson's brigade, Henry Jackson's detachment, and Richard Butler's detachment. These troops pushed back the Queen's Rangers but came under some cannon fire and fell back into some trees, leaving two of Oswald's guns exposed on their left flank. After his soldiers dispersed some British light dragoons, Lee sent John Durkee's brigade to support Oswald's guns. Almost immediately Durkee was wounded and replaced by Jeremiah Olney of the 2nd Rhode Island Regiment. Lee ordered La Fayette to take Wayne's original brigade and press the British left flank.

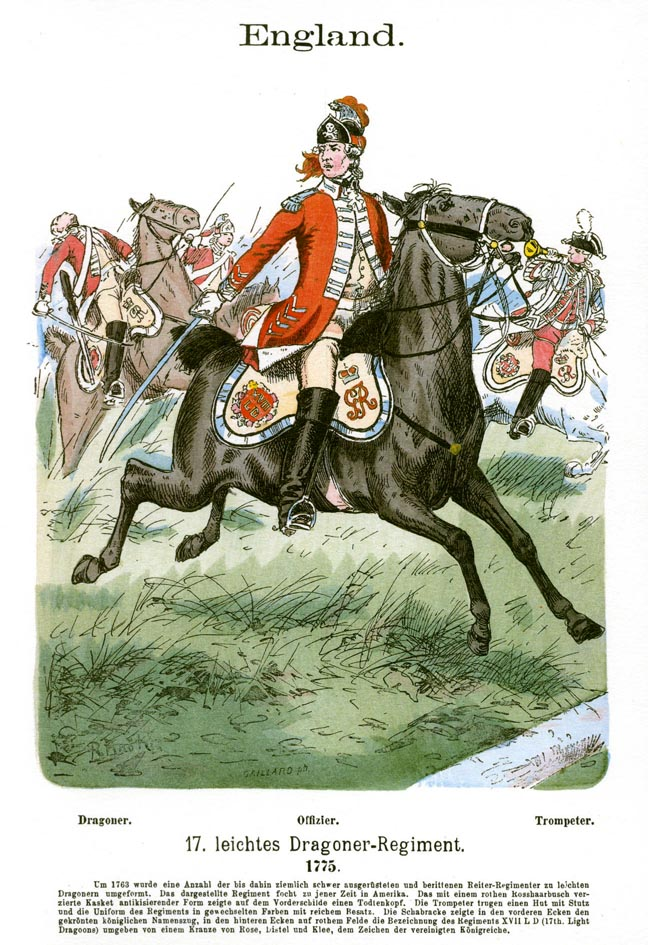
British light dragoon, 1775

Around 10:30 AM, Lee saw to his shock that Clinton was advancing with 6,000 troops. He doubted that his soldiers were capable of stopping their enemies. Because Lee was recently released in a prisoner exchange, he failed to grasp the improvements in the American army since his capture in December 1776. As Lee pondered his next more, he saw Oswald leading two of his guns to the rear. When Lee demanded to know why, Oswald explained that one cannon was disabled, the crews were exhausted from the day's extreme heat, and that the guns had run out of roundshot. Lee then authorized the move. At this time, Scott and Maxwell chose to fall back, either because they saw Oswald retreat or because they noticed Butler and Jackson changing position. This seems to have provoked other units to withdraw. When Lee realized what was happening, he issued orders for a general retreat. Oswald quickly organized a massed battery of 10 cannons to cover the move.

As the retreat continued, Oswald received orders first to hold and then to continue to fall back. Oswald broke up his grand battery, sending Cook's two guns to rejoin Olney's brigade and Randall's two guns to rejoin Maxwell's brigade. Meanwhile, the worn out men of Wells' battery were ordered out of the battle. Around 11:00 AM, the American main body started to arrive in the area and Washington first learned of Lee's retreat. As Lee tried to extemporize a defense line, he ordered Olney's brigade to hold a hedgerow while Wayne asked Walter Stewart and Nathaniel Ramsey defend some woods on the left flank. With his four remaining guns, Oswald placed two on a hill behind the hedgerow to support Olney's men while the other two were ordered to cover Wayne's troops. Lee ordered Henry Livingston Jr. to help cover the two guns with Olney, but for some reason Livingston moved his entire command behind the hedgerow on Olney's left.

After a spirited combat the Brigade of Guards drove off the troops under Stewart and Ramsey. The action then focused on the hedgerow as the 16th Light Dragoons attacked and were repulsed. Clinton in person led forward the 1st and 2nd Grenadier Battalions. Oswald's guns blasted the British with grapeshot at 40 yards (37 m) but the elite troops overran the hedgerow. At this time the commanding officer of the 2nd Grenadiers, Henry Monckton was killed by grapeshot. Washington's artillery chief, Henry Knox ordered Oswald to withdraw his cannon across Spottswood Middle Brook. Despite the retreat, which was covered by Olney, no American guns fell into British hands. The next two hours were occupied by an artillery duel between 10 British pieces near the hedgerow and between 10 and 14 American cannons that Knox assembled on Perrine Ridge. In the official orders of Monmouth, Oswald's actions were praised.

After the battle Lee accused Washington of "cruel injustice" in a letter. The incident escalated until Lee was ordered to stand a court martial for disobedience of orders, making an unnecessary and disorderly retreat, and disrespect to the commander in chief. At the trial, Oswald, Knox, and others testified in Lee's defense. Nevertheless, Lee was found guilty and suspended from command for one year. Lee finally wrote a letter to Congress that was so insulting that he was dismissed from the army.

== Journalist and soldier ==
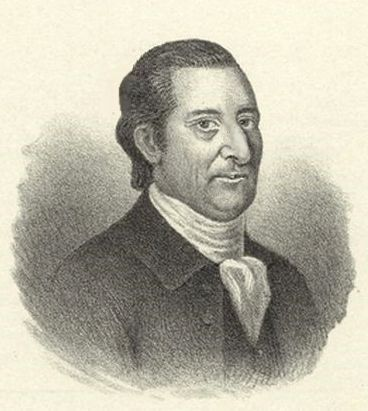
William Goddard (Note: Goddard is considered to be the principle originator of the U.S. postal system as it exists today.)

Feeling that he should have been promoted, Oswald resigned from the army after Monmouth and joined William Goddard at the Maryland Journal in Baltimore, Maryland. While there, he printed Lee's criticisms of Washington, provoking a popular outcry against Oswald. He left the Maryland Journal and went to Philadelphia, Pennsylvania, in April 1782 to start the Independent Gazetteer, or the Chronicle of Freedom, a harshly partisan newspaper. He opened Bradford's London Coffee House in 1783 and began printing the Price Current which was possibly the earliest business newspaper in the United States.

In the summer of 1788, Oswald printed a piece in the Independent Gazetteer that made anonymous allegations against Andrew Browne, the head master of a girls' school. Browne demanded to know who made the charges against him and Oswald refused to provide the names. The head master then sued Oswald for libel on 2 July 1788. Under his own byline, Oswald responded by printing a broadside. In it Oswald claimed the "rights of the press and of freemen" were being attacked. He hinted that the legal action was a Federalist Party plot to harass him. He alluded to past libel actions in which he was acquitted. He asserted that libels were, "a doctrine incompatible with law and liberty, and at once destructive of the privileges of free country...". He proclaimed that Pennsylvanians would not allow, "the freedom of the press to be violated".

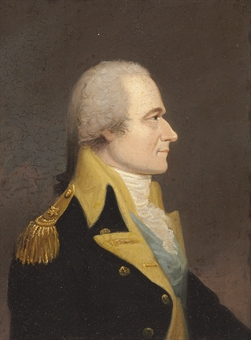
Alexander Hamilton

On 12 July 1788, Oswald was charged with contempt of court in Respublica v. Oswald for publishing the broadside. Browne's attorney alleged that Oswald's purpose was to prejudice the minds of the public in a case that was pending. The court, while acknowledging the freedom of the press, nevertheless sentenced Oswald to one month in jail and a £10 fine. On 19 April 1809, Respublica v. Passmore limited the power of courts to issue summary contempts such as the one used against Oswald.

In the summer of 1787, during and immediately after the Constitutional Convention, Oswald printed articles in support of ratification. After the convention concluded, however, Oswald began publishing pieces critical of the proposed constitution. The Independent Gazetteer was one of only twelve papers in the United States to regularly publish essays opposing ratification.

Between 5 October 1787 and 24 November 1788 a series of 24 anti-Federalist articles were published in the Independent Gazetteer and Freeman's Journal in Philadelphia. Written by Centinel the Letters of Centinel argued against adopting the United States Constitution. It is believed that Samuel Bryan wrote most of the articles, but that Oswald may have penned a few of them. Oswald moved to New York City and published the Independent Gazette, or New York Journal Revived. This was the journal that his father-in-law started. He came out against Alexander Hamilton in print and a duel between the two was narrowly averted by friends. In 1792 he traveled first to England, then France.

On 18 September 1792, Oswald received a colonel's commission in the French army from General Charles François Dumouriez. He fought at the Battle of Jemappes on 6 November 1792 where he had command of four of the 24 artillery units. Historian Digby Smith noted that most of the Austrian casualties in the action were inflicted by cannon fire. In a subsequent action at Liège, Oswald commanded 12 of the 24 units. On 16 January 1793 he left the army in Belgium to go on a secret mission for the French government. From 20 February to 8 June 1793 he was employed in Ireland where he reported on dissatisfaction with the British government. Being American, he was able to go about his espionage activities without causing suspicion.

A remarkable set of documents survived in which Oswald sought reimbursement from the French government for expenses he incurred in the line of duty. On 11 and 23 July 1793 he sent the requests to the Minister of War Jean Baptiste Noël Bouchotte. His secret mission was certified by the Minister of Foreign Affairs Pierre Henri Hélène Marie Lebrun-Tondu. A letter of introduction from Thomas Paine testified that Oswald's motive was to repay France for helping America in its War of Independence. Oswald returned to New York City and died there of Yellow Fever on 30 September 1795.

== Family ==
Including their eldest son John who was mentioned earlier, Oswald and his wife Elizabeth Holt had seven children. John Holt Oswald became an international merchant and died in 1810, leaving behind his wife Emily and three surviving children. Another son William Hunter Oswald (b. 1787) also went into international trade. He married Sarah Stamper Hall (b. 1792) and was working at Trieste on the Adriatic Sea in 1815. Thomas Oswald died without having any children, Ann never married, and Phoebe died in infancy. Rebecca married a man named Glenn and Elizabeth married Dr. George Balfour who joined the United States Army.
