= Federalist No. 37 =

Federalist Paper by James Madison

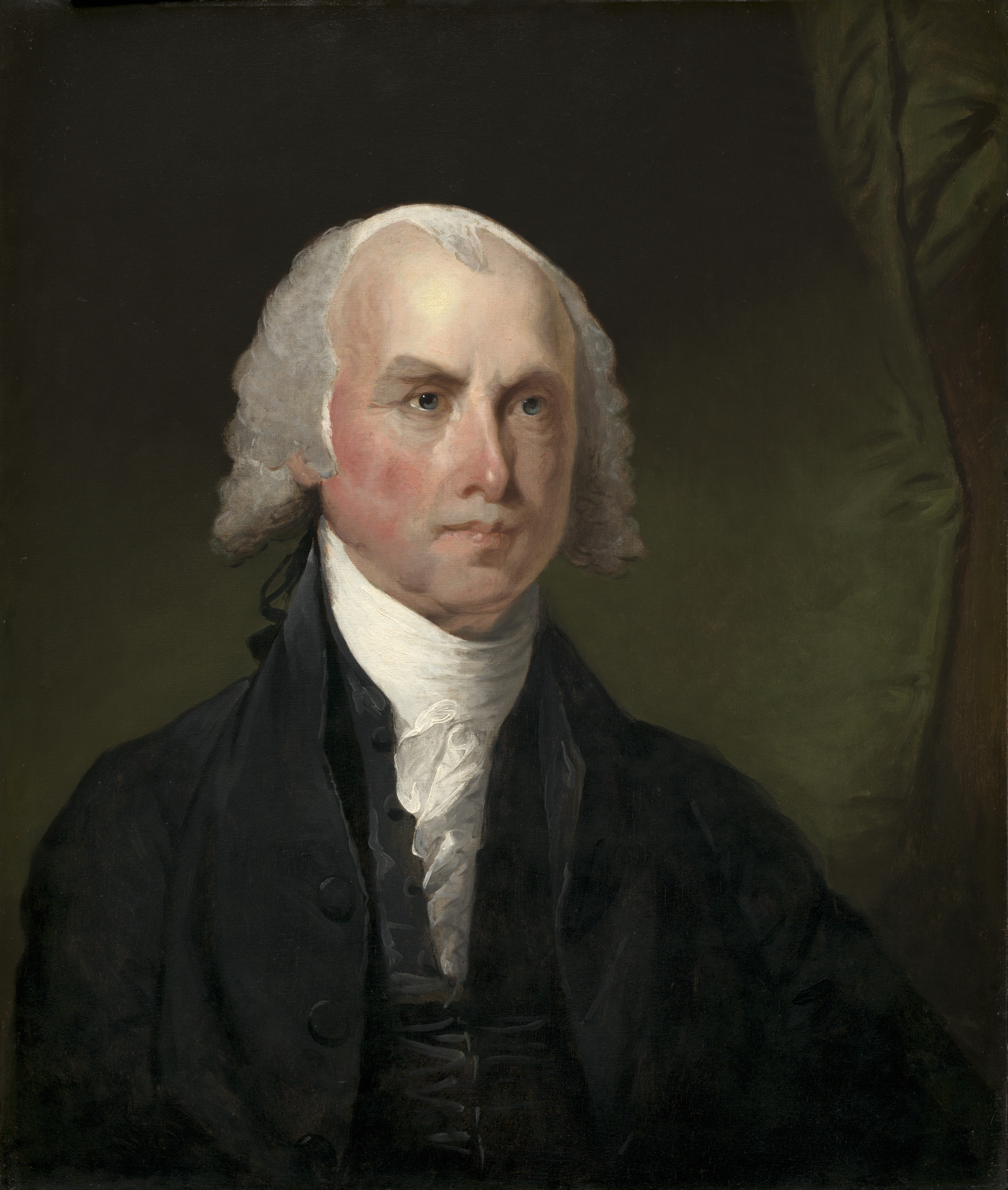
- James Madison, author of Federalist No. 37
- Author: James Madison
- Original title: Concerning the Difficulties of the Convention in Devising a Proper Form of Government
- Language: English
- Series: The Federalist
- Publisher: The Daily Advertiser
- Publication date: January 11, 1788
- Publication place: United States
- Media type: Newspaper
- Preceded by: Federalist No. 36
- Followed by: Federalist No. 38

Federalist No. 37 is an essay by James Madison, the thirty-seventh of The Federalist Papers. It was first published by The Daily Advertiser (New York) on January 11, 1788 under the pseudonym Publius, the name under which all The Federalist papers were published. This paper discusses some of the political questions raised at the constitutional convention. It is titled "Concerning the Difficulties of the Convention in Devising a Proper Form of Government".

In Federalist no. 37, Madison pointed out the difficulties that loomed over the Convention. One such problem was the question of the authority of the state versus the liberty of the people.

He wrote, "Energy in government is essential to that security against external and internal danger and to that prompt and salutary execution of the law, which enter into the very definition of good government. Stability in government is essential to national character... On comparing, however, these valuable ingredients with the vital principles of liberty, we must perceive at once the difficulty of mingling them in their due proportions."

Madison pointed out other issues that faced the convention, such as the division of powers between the general government and the States, the large and small States, and between regions of the country.

In closing he points out that it should be pleasing that the framers were able to put aside various differences and agree on a common form of government.
