= Federalist No. 38 =

Federalist Paper by James Madison

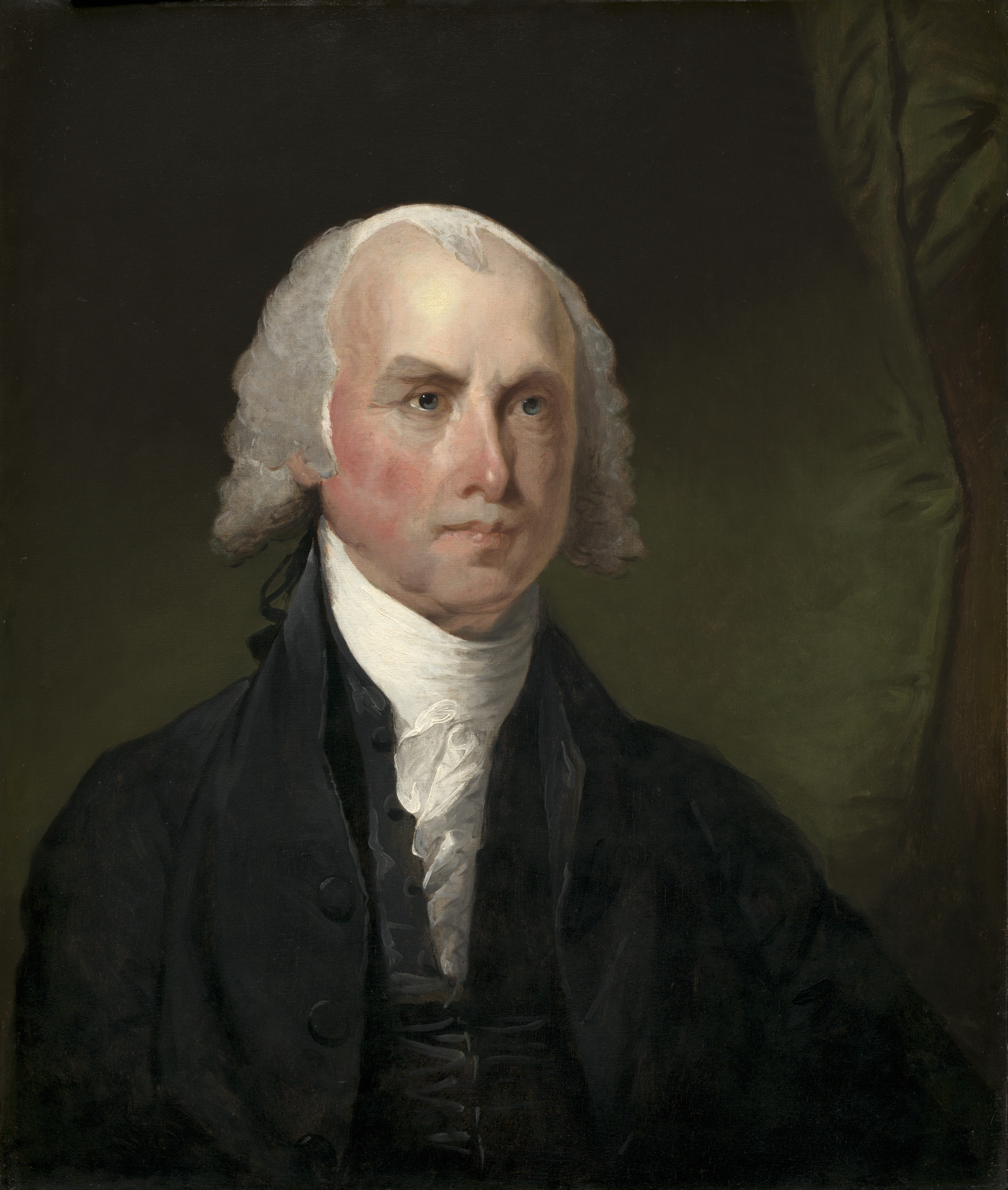
- James Madison, author of Federalist No. 38
- Author: James Madison
- Original title: The Same Subject Continued, and the Incoherence of the Objections to the New Plan Exposed
- Language: English
- Series: The Federalist
- Publisher: The Independent Journal
- Publication date: January 12, 1788
- Publication place: United States
- Media type: Newspaper
- Preceded by: Federalist No. 37
- Followed by: Federalist No. 39

Federalist No. 38 is an essay by James Madison, the thirty-eighth of The Federalist Papers. It was first published by The Independent Journal (New York) on January 12, 1788, under the pseudonym Publius, the name under which all The Federalist papers were published. Madison continues his topic from Federalist No. 37, the political questions examined by the constitutional convention. The essay is titled "The Same Subject Continued, and the Incoherence of the Objections to the New Plan Exposed". In it Madison argues that despite the many objections to the Constitution, it is still a vast and necessary improvement over the Articles of Confederation.

The essay mostly addresses the concern of imperfections in the new government. It covers history of the formation of governments, starting with the Minoans. The text is also notable for a single mention of slavery:

"It is a matter both of wonder and regret, that those who raise so many objections against the new Constitution should never call to mind the defects of that which is to be exchanged for it. It is not necessary that the former should be perfect; it is sufficient that the latter is more imperfect...Is the importation of slaves permitted by the new Constitution for twenty years? By the old it is permitted forever."
