= Brutus 1 =

Antifederalist essay by Brutus

Brutus 1 is an essay written by Brutus that was published on October 18, 1787. Brutus 1 predicted the opening paragraph of Federalist 1 two weeks before Federalist 1 was published. The essay criticizes the, then yet-to-be-ratified, United States Constitution. Brutus warned that the Necessary and Proper and Supremacy clauses could allow the federal government to decide the limits to their power and render the states insignificant. Brutus argued that large republics couldn't stay democratic, believing that small republics worked better. Brutus also expressed that the limited taxing ability of the states allows the federal government to eliminate some the sovereignty of the states.

== Analysis ==
Brutus expressed that the government proposed by the new constitution would consolidate national power, making the states inconsequential. Brutus asserted that state constitutions and laws would become void if they were inconsistent with the constitution. Brutus also argued that Congress's power to make all laws necessary and proper and the fact that the new constitution and federal law would be supreme over the states—powers proposed to be given to the federal government by the Necessary and Proper and Supremacy clauses—would allow the national government to expand its power. Brutus believed that the federal government's power would only be limited to what it decided was necessary and proper.

Brutus called a large republic impracticable, as people wouldn't know their leaders well and lose confidence in their government. Brutus also believed that the territory of the United States was too large to maintain without a standing army and/or police force. Brutus further argued that unaccountable members of the executive branch could use their power for their own personal benefit, and federal judges would interpret the constitution in ways that expanded the federal government's power. Brutus didn't believe that a government as large as the United States would be able to stay democratic, which was exemplified by Brutus with the expansion of territory and tyranny in the Greek and Roman republics. Brutus preferred the idea of a confederation of small republics over the large republic that the constitution proposed.

Since no state had the ability to print money nor put taxes on imports or exports, Brutus contended that the only way for the states to raise money to maintain their governments and pay their debts was through direct taxation of the people, which could also be limited by the federal government having the same power. These two limits would allow, according to Brutus, the federal government to destroy state sovereignty, as the states would be unable to raise their own revenue.
