= Federalist No. 34 =

Federalist Paper by Alexander Hamilton on taxation

- Alexander Hamilton, author of Federalist No. 34
- Author: Alexander Hamilton
- Original title: The Same Subject Continued: Concerning the General Power of Taxation
- Language: English
- Series: The Federalist
- Publisher: The Daily Advertiser, New York Packet, and The Independent Journal
- Publication date: January 5, 1788
- Publication place: United States
- Media type: Newspaper
- Preceded by: Federalist No. 33
- Followed by: Federalist No. 35

Federalist No. 34 is an essay by Alexander Hamilton, the thirty-fourth of The Federalist Papers. It was published on January 5, 1788, under the pseudonym Publius, the name under which all The Federalist papers were published. This is the fifth of seven essays by Hamilton on the then-controversial issue of taxation. It is titled "The Same Subject Continued: Concerning the General Power of Taxation".

== Brief Precis ==
Hamilton's aim is to demonstrate that a government must have unlimited power of taxation for such circumstances as war and natural disaster. He argues that the state governments, which share taxation rights with the federal government, will serve as a balance and prevent abuse of such powers. He argues, further, that the federal government will always incur the greatest expenses, should have the greatest body to draw taxes from, and require a "greater power of taxation than the states."
