= Federalist No. 5 =

Federalist Paper by John Jay

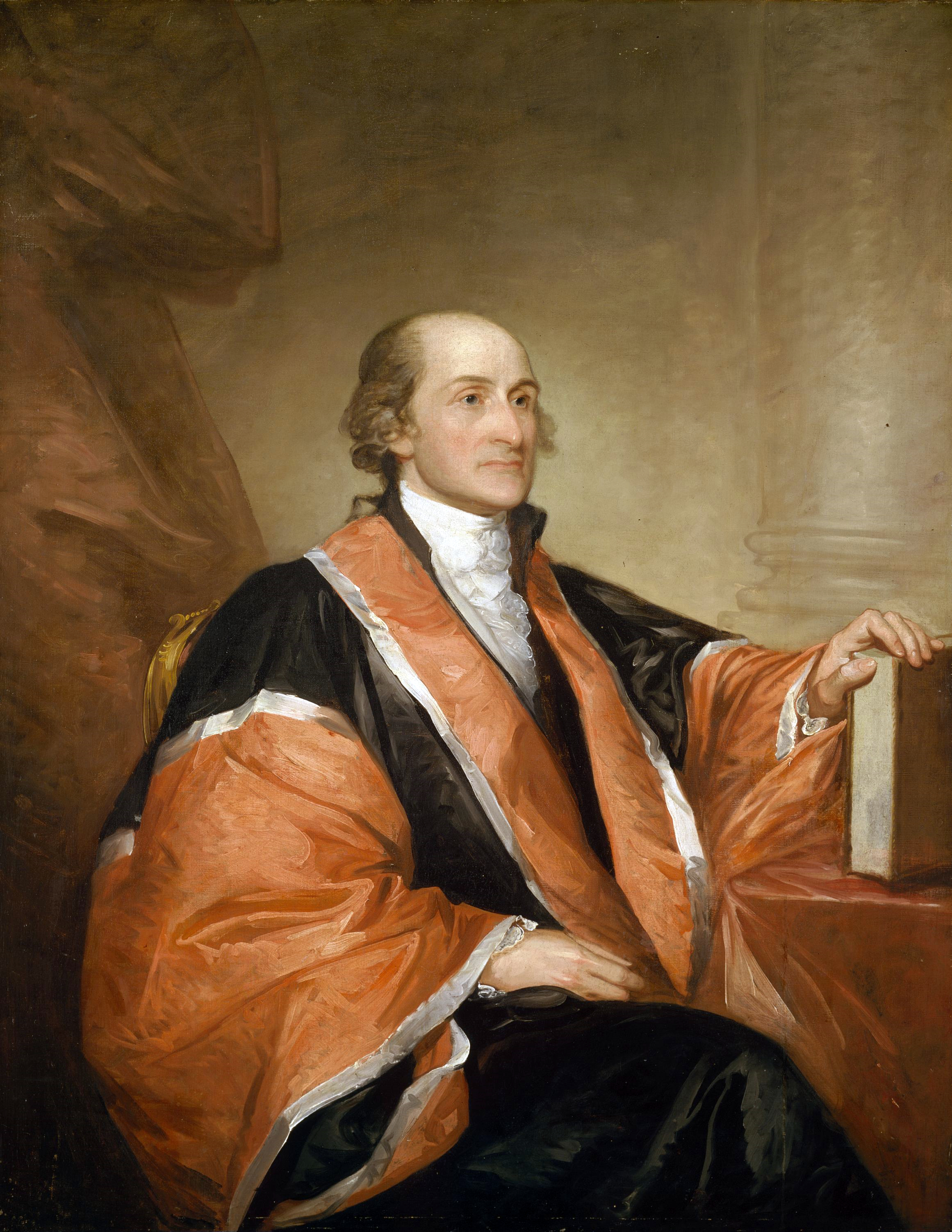
- John Jay, author of Federalist No. 5
- Author: John Jay
- Original title: The Same Subject Continued: Concerning Dangers from Foreign Force and Influence
- Language: English
- Series: The Federalist
- Publisher: The Independent Journal
- Publication date: November 10, 1787
- Publication place: United States
- Media type: Newspaper
- Preceded by: Federalist No. 4
- Followed by: Federalist No. 6
- Text: Federalist No. 5 at Wikisource

Federalist No. 5, titled "The Same Subject Continued: Concerning Dangers from Foreign Force and Influence", is a political essay by John Jay, the fifth of The Federalist Papers. It was first published in The Independent Journal on November 10, 1787, under the pseudonym Publius, the name under which all The Federalist Papers were published. It is the last of four essays by Jay advocating political union as a means of protection from foreign nations.

Federalist No. 5 addresses the idea of states forming regional confederacies and how it would affect foreign relations. Jay argued that these confederacies would be cautious or envious regarding one another while maintaining stronger relations with foreign nations. He theorized that the Northern United States would grow stronger than the Southern United States, causing conflict between the regions. He contrasted this scenario with political union, arguing that union would prevent conflict by combining the states' strength and aligning their national interests. Jay's ideas in Federalist No. 5 were reflected at several points in American history, including the American Civil War that saw the Northern and Southern United States in direct military conflict.

== Summary ==
Jay opens his argument by quoting Queen Anne's letter to the Parliament of Scotland in favor of British unification. He compares the kingdoms of Great Britain to hypothetical confederacies of American states, arguing that such confederacies would come into conflict with one another. He suggests that one region would become stronger than the others—considering the Northern United States to be the most likely—and that other regions would respond with envy and seek to hinder its growth.

Jay contends that conflict between American confederacies would prevent them from rivaling other nations, and he argues that defense pacts between the confederacies would be unlikely. He compares this scenario to the kingdoms of Great Britain and the kingdoms of Spain prior to unification, in which they operated as independent nations with separate national interests. He then argues that these separate interests would lead to different foreign policies and to alliances with different European nations. Finally, he warns that such alliances would allow foreign nations to gain influence, likening it to conquests of the Roman Empire carried out through pretended alliances.

== Background and publication ==
Federalist No. 5 was written by John Jay. Following the Constitutional Convention in 1787, Hamilton worked with James Madison and Alexander Hamilton to write a series of essays to explain the provisions of the Constitution of the United States and persuade New York to ratify it. They published these essays in New York newspapers under the shared pseudonym Publius. It was first published in The Independent Journal on November 10, 1787, followed by The Daily Advertiser on November 12 and The New-York Packet on November 13. Federalist No. 5 was the last of four essays by Jay supporting political union to protect the United States from other nations. It continued directly from the ideas of Federalist No. 4, arguing that the states would be unable maintain their own security without political union.

== Analysis ==
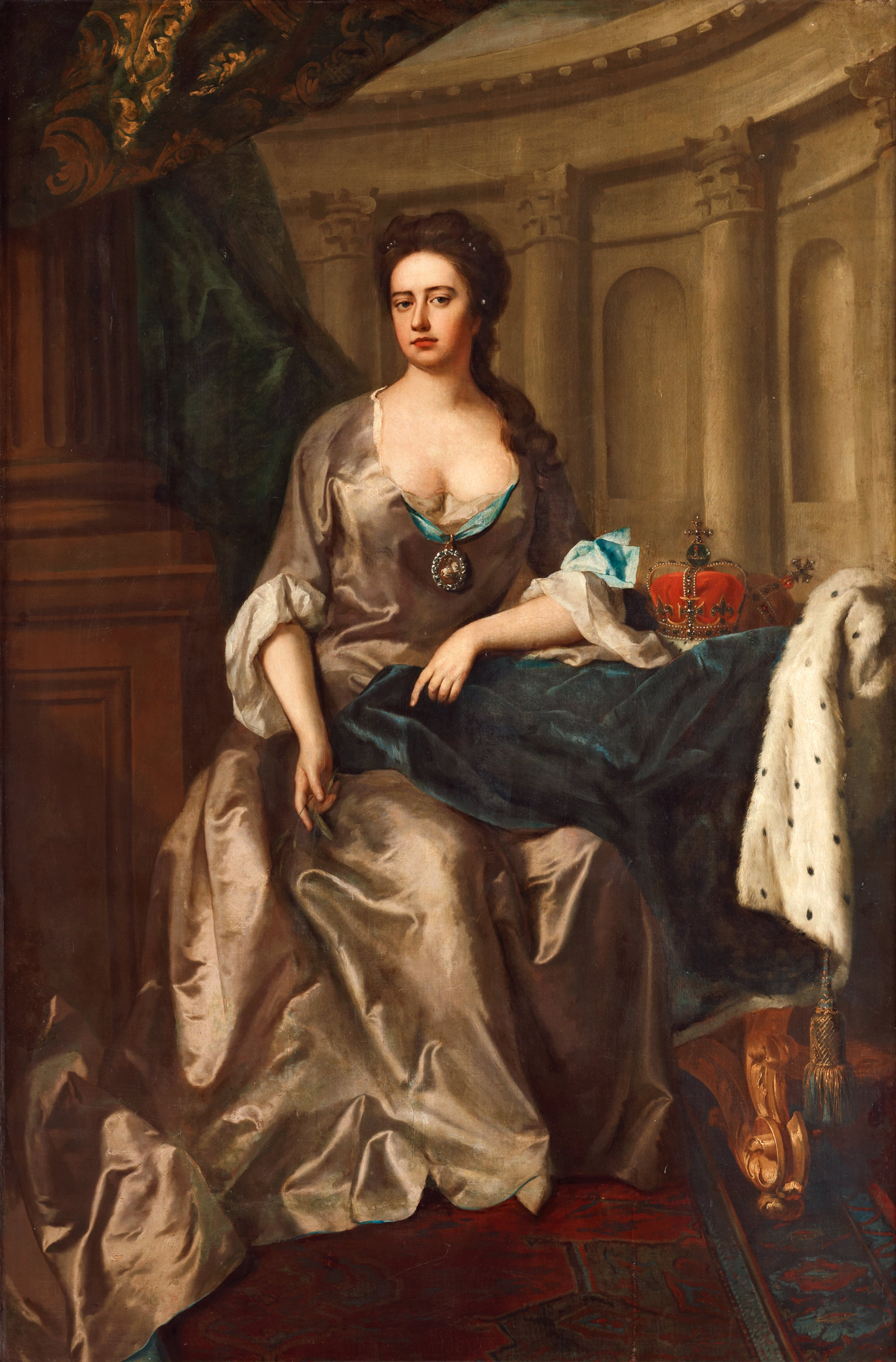
Jay quotes Queen Anne, adapting her argument for British unification to the cause of American unification

In Federalist No. 5, Jay warned against the formation of regional confederacies instead of a national union. He argued that under such a system, the states would work against one another and fall under the influence of foreign countries. Jay insisted that union was necessary because a national government would be stronger than any individual confederacy, as all states would cooperate toward the same interests, and the national government would have access to greater resources and military strength than any confederacy would individually.

American politics of the time were defined by sectionalism, particularly between the Northern and Southern regions of the United States. The two regions held different interests, as the North maintained a mercantilist economy while the South was an agrarian society. Jay considered this distinction a likely cause for conflict between the states, supposing that their economic interests would put them in opposition to one another. He also believed that these separate interests would incentivize the confederacies to seek different European allies, further putting them in conflict with one another. Jay contended that once this foreign influence was established, it would be difficult to reverse. Jay's arguments in Federalist No. 5 contrast with those he made in Federalist No. 2, in which he proposed that the American people are naturally unified under common interests and ideals. Federalist No. 5 maintained that these factors alone were not sufficient, and that the preservation of an American nationality was contingent on a central government to maintain union between the states.

Federalist No. 5 was one of several instances in which envy and jealousy are described as threats to the American people in The Federalist Papers. Political theorist Jon Elster described Federalist No. 5 as having the "most striking" example of this phenomenon. Jay speculated that one of the confederacies would likely become more powerful over time, further increasing diplomatic tension between them and provoking action to hinder one another. In Jay's view, this likelihood preempted any hope that regional confederacies would work as allies for an extended time. He feared that confederacies bordering one another would grow distrustful and exist in constant fear of war.

Like many of The Federalist Papers, Federalist No. 5 described historical events that relate to its arguments. Jay likened confederacies between the states to the division of England, Scotland, and Wales in Great Britain and to the Iberian kingdoms that combined to form Spain. To make this comparison, he quoted a letter written by Queen Anne in support of British unification that closely resembled the style and argumentation of The Federalist Papers. Jay believed that the unification of Britain was closely analogous to a potential union of the United States. In both cases, he saw it logical that countries with similar interests and geographic qualities should be combined under a single nation. Likewise, he believed that a system of confederacies would be reminiscent of the conflict-ridden nature of the British kingdoms prior to unification. Jay also likened confederacies between the states to smaller nations that aligned with the Roman Empire in ancient times, noting that Rome's desire for expansion caused it to routinely conquer what were once its allies. This was part of a broader distaste by the framers of imperial government in which they feared that it would undermine republicanism, as it did in ancient Rome.

== Aftermath ==
Jay did not write another essay for The Federalist Papers until Federalist No. 64, which was his final entry in the series. The argument that American unity requires a national government was revisited in Federalist No. 11 and No. 22. Jay's fear of border disputes was realized when the United States came into conflict with Upper Canada during the War of 1812 and with Mexico during the Mexican–American War. The sectionalism described by Jay between the Northern and Southern United States was a predominant factor in American politics over the following generations. It nearly caused military conflict during the nullification crisis, when South Carolina threatened to nullify the 1828 Tariff of Abominations, which it saw as serving Northern interests. Hostility between the North and South eventually culminated in the American Civil War in 1861. By the 21st century, economic globalization and modern warfare have altered the circumstances under which Jay and Queen Anne advocated unification for economic and military protection.
