= Federalist No. 39 =

Federalist Paper by James Madison regarding representative democracy

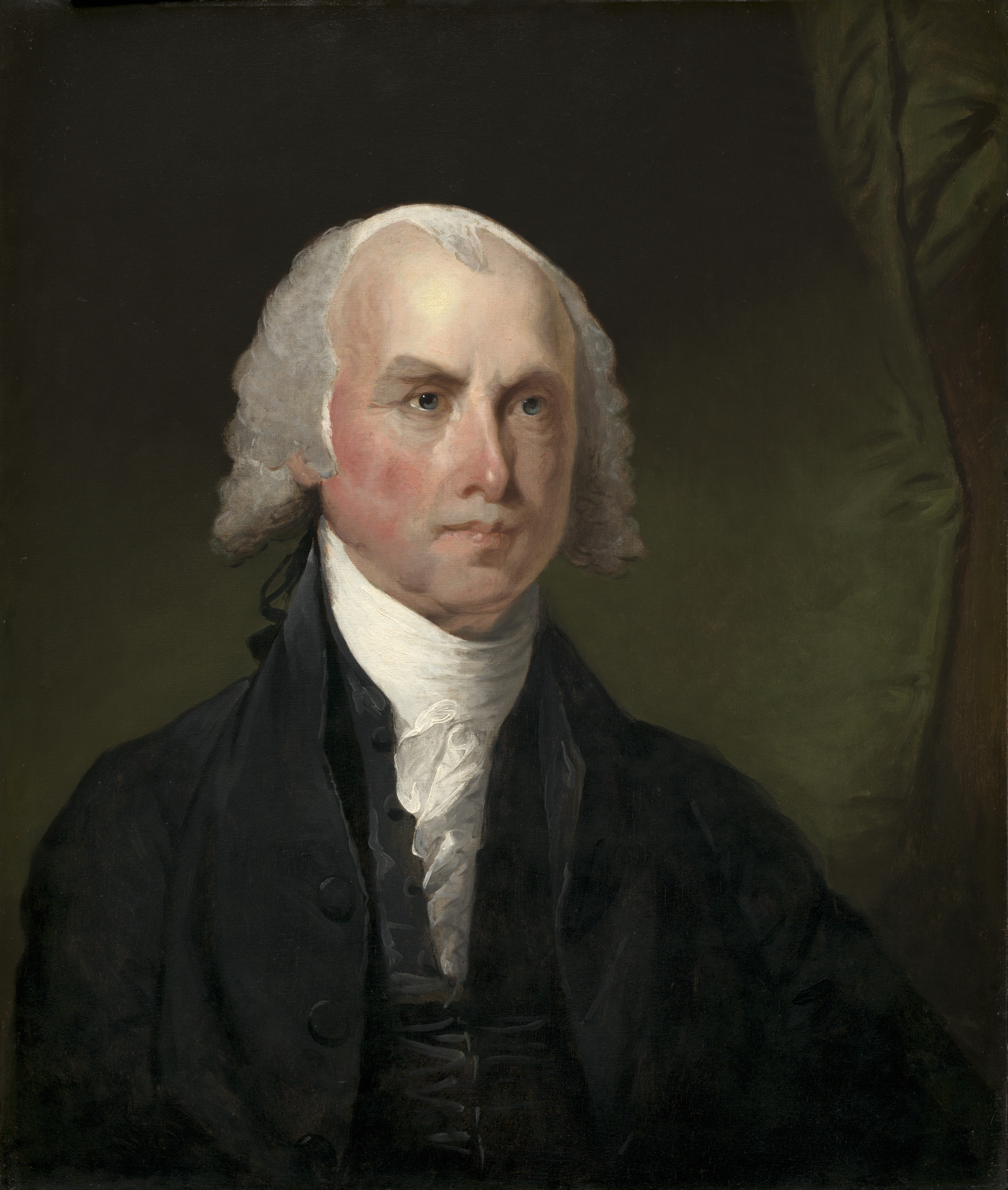
- James Madison, author of Federalist No. 39
- Author: James Madison
- Original title: The Conformity of the Plan to Republican Principles
- Language: English
- Series: The Federalist
- Publisher: The Independent Journal
- Publication date: January 16, 1788
- Publication place: United States
- Media type: Newspaper
- Preceded by: Federalist No. 38
- Followed by: Federalist No. 40

Federalist No. 39, titled "The Conformity of the Plan to Republican Principles", is an essay by James Madison, the thirty-ninth of The Federalist Papers, first published by The Independent Journal (New York) on January 16, 1788. Madison defines a republican form of government, and he also considers whether the nation is federal or national: a confederacy, or consolidation of states.

This essay is one of 85 to urge ratification of the U.S. Constitution. James Madison, along with Alexander Hamilton and John Jay, sent these essays to try to sway the remaining nine states to preserve the Federal form of government, with a National government interest.

== Background ==
Madison, as written in Federalist No. 10, had decided why factions cannot be controlled by pure democracy:

A common passion or interest will, in almost every case, be felt by a majority of the whole; a communication and concert result from the form of government itself; and there is nothing to check the inducements to sacrifice the weaker party or an obnoxious individual.

Madison then theorized the use of a republic, and the first form of a republic must be evaluated. The Roman Republic was a republic, but it was heavily monopolized at the top, almost aristocratic, in a sense, as it cared only about the rich. The poor were treated as outcasts, not as members of society, and were kept at a level of political immaturity rendering them mute at public meetings. In Madison's view every individual enjoys an absolute right, one of many divinely-bestowed endowments, notwithstanding his or her political, economic, historical, or social standing to be treated equally by, and exercise the right to an equal say (vis-a-vis all citizens) with regard to the nature of the government and authority of any Republic under which he or she is subordinated.

== Summary ==
Madison defines what "republic" means and states three rules that must apply to be considered a republic:

1. What is the foundation of its establishment? Only the people of the nation and no one else would make the decision of who rules the government.
2. What are the sources of its power? The person who is chosen by the people should not break any rules or abuse their power.
3. Who has the authority to make future changes? When someone is chosen to rule the country, they should be in that position for only a certain amount of time unless the people of the nation feel that it is best to impeach them.

This corresponds to the Madisonian republic, which means the system of government where the citizens of the state elect representatives to make decisions for them using three powerful branches: the executive, the judicial, and the legislative.

From early in the Constitutional Convention, Madison held the position that the national government should be federal because if it were more extensive in relation to the states, that would increase the "probability of duration, happiness and good order". It was not initially clear how the new government would interact with the states, and Madison was in favor of a federal form, "a political system in which at least two territorial levels of government share sovereign constitutional authority over their respective division and joint share of law-making powers; differently put, neither the federal government nor the relevant federative entities may unilaterally alter one another's powers without a process of constitutional amendment in which both levels of government participate."

Other alternatives included a confederacy as under the Articles of Confederation or a more strictly national government.
