= Federalist No. 36 =

Federalist Paper by Alexander Hamilton, last of his seven on taxation

- Alexander Hamilton, author of Federalist No. 36
- Author: Alexander Hamilton
- Original title: The Same Subject Continued: Concerning the General Power of Taxation
- Language: English
- Series: The Federalist
- Publisher: New York Packet
- Publication date: January 8, 1788
- Publication place: United States
- Media type: Newspaper
- Preceded by: Federalist No. 35
- Followed by: Federalist No. 37

Federalist No. 36 is an essay by Alexander Hamilton, the thirty-sixth of The Federalist Papers. It was first published in the New York Packet on January 8, 1788, under the pseudonym Publius, the name under which all The Federalist papers were published. This is the last of seven essays by Hamilton on the then-controversial issue of taxation. It is titled "The Same Subject Continued: Concerning the General Power of Taxation".

== Summary ==
Hamilton details the government's need for a body of tax collectors knowledgeable of every district, so as to establish a value to be taxed. He claims that this will be accomplished by using the same tax collectors as the state governments do. Hamilton argues against a poll tax.
