= Federalist No. 1 =

Essay by Alexander Hamilton, first of the Federalist Papers

- Alexander Hamilton, author of Federalist No. 1
- Author: Alexander Hamilton
- Language: English
- Series: The Federalist
- Publisher: The Independent Journal
- Publication date: October 27, 1787
- Publication place: United States
- Media type: newspaper
- Preceded by: none
- Followed by: Federalist No. 2
- Text: Federalist No. 1 at Wikisource

Federalist No. 1, titled "General Introduction", is an essay by Alexander Hamilton. It is the first essay of The Federalist Papers, and it serves as a general outline of the ideas that the writers wished to explore regarding the proposed constitution of the United States. The essay was first published in The Independent Journal on October 27, 1787, under the pseudonym Publius, the name under which all essays of The Federalist Papers were published.

Federalist No. 1 describes the ratification debate, including Hamilton's views of civil discourse and the debate's polarizing nature. He warned that there may be bad actors in the debate, but he insisted that emotion and accusations should be disregarded in favor of reason to determine the best interest of the nation. Federalist No. 1 reflects Hamilton's belief that good government can be formed by its citizens. The essay concludes with an outline of topics for future Federalist Papers, though not all of them were covered in the series.

== Summary ==
Publius acknowledges the debate as to whether the Constitution of the United States should be ratified. He comments on the decision's historical significance and insists that the decision must be made through reason without being biased by other motivations. Elaborating on this, he warns of men who will oppose ratification for personal gain, but he also encourages the reader to treat opposing ideas as legitimate so they can be evaluated on the strength of their argument. Publius expresses a concern that the ratification debate will lead to passion taking precedence over reason, and he pleads with the reader to ignore appeals to emotion when considering the issue.

Publius declares his own position in support of ratification, and he lists several topics to be addressed in subsequent essays:

- "The utility of the union to your political prosperity"
- "The insufficiency of the present confederation to preserve that union"
- "The necessity of a government at least equally energetic with the one proposed, to the attainment of this object"
- "The conformity of the proposed constitution to the true principles of republican government"
- "Its analogy to your own state constitution"
- "The additional security which its adoption will afford to the preservation of that species of government, to liberty, and to property"

== Background and publication ==
Federalist No. 1 was written by Alexander Hamilton. Following the Constitutional Convention in 1787, Hamilton worked with James Madison and John Jay to write a series of essays to explain the provisions of the Constitution of the United States and persuade New York to ratify it. They published these essays in New York newspapers under the shared pseudonym Publius. It was first published in the Independent Journal on October 27, 1787, followed by the Daily Advertiser and the New-York Packet on October 30. By the time the Federalist Papers began publication, the ratification debate was already a major political issue. Hamilton wrote Federalist No. 1 around the time the Anti-Federalist Papers were first published. The authors of the Federalist Papers did not know exactly how long the series would run when they published their first essay.

== Analysis ==
=== Describing ratification ===
Federalist No. 1 served as an introduction to the Federalist Papers in its entirety, describing the arguments that would be made. Through the essay, Hamilton appealed to the magnitude of the ratification decision. He presented it as a decision that would define the nature of government, not just for the American people of the time but for future societies more broadly. In his view, it would decide whether humanity was ready for government by the people. Hamilton proposed in Federalist No. 1 that ratification of the constitution would allow for a closer bond between the American people and allow the creation of a stronger national identity. He considered the creation of a union to be a means to an end, to bring prosperity. He did not indicate whether the benefits he touted were for the specific reader in an individualist sense or the entire nation in a collectivist sense.

The constitution required ratification by popular conventions in each state. Federalist No. 1 presented it as an issue for the people to decide. Hamilton believed that even if the constitution was ratified, it would not be possible to maintain a stable government unless a majority of the population supported it. He invoked ideas of American exceptionalism, suggesting that the United States was developing unprecedented government that would be replicated throughout the world. Hamilton believed that the capacity for reason to guide the American government set it apart from other nations. Alternatively, he argued that failure to ratify the constitution would end with a "dismemberment of the Union".

=== Describing opponents of ratification ===
Hamilton's chief ideological opponents were Thomas Jefferson and the Anti-Federalists: though Hamilton and Jefferson both believed in a sharing of power between government and the people, and both believed in the government's role in shaping the nation, Jefferson favored a smaller government overall. Hamilton linked the decision to ratify with morality and intellectual honesty, describing it as a consideration for the public good. He argued that opposition to the constitution primarily existed out of personal interest. He described two types of people that opposed ratification. First, he said that some politicians may oppose it because they wish to avoid losing power to the national government. Second, he said that profiteers may oppose it because they could take advantage of an unstable political environment. Hamilton suggested that he was above ideas, advocating objectivity that he believed would logically conclude in support for ratification.

Hamilton dispelled any idea that emotion or personal interest, as opposed to reason, should influence the decision to ratify, declaring his own personal motivations to be irrelevant as well. He believed that objective truth could be found even among controversial matters, but that agreement on this truth is not to be expected. Hamilton feared that supporters of the constitution may behave in an unbecoming manner toward opponents, attributing negative intentions to them all. Despite his derision of the constitution's opponents, Hamilton conceded that some opponents may have honest motivations and some proponents may have selfish motivations. In particular, he described those who feared restrictions on liberty as an honest but misguided group. It was this group of honest opponents that Hamilton sought to persuade. Hamilton believed an overemphasis on liberty at the expense of good government created a "spirit of narrow and illiberal distrust" and that it was necessary to create such a passion in favor of government rather than against it.

Hamilton's urging of reason over emotion more broadly addressed the concept of political polarization and the breakdown of civil discourse. While he criticized his opponents, he also addressed the need to make an assumption of good faith in political discourse and to avoid demonization of political opponents. He expressed a dim view of those who speak in absolutes, who attribute malicious motives to political opponents, who attack opposing arguments before considering them, and who use "the loudness of their declamations and the bitterness of their invectives" to strengthen their position in political discourse. He instead argued that different people can come to different conclusions about an idea and that bad ideas do not necessarily reflect on one's character.

=== Political philosophy and forms of government ===
Federalist No. 1 established a style of argument based in Enlightenment philosophy. The main points set out by Federalist No. 1 followed the structure of philosophers Thomas Hobbes and John Locke, presenting first the needs of the people and then developing the idea of government as a solution to those needs. Hamilton disagreed with their solution, however, as Hobbes and Locke both proposed absolute government while Hamilton proposed limited government. He also deviated from Hobbes's view of humanity, arguing that many people are willing to give up personal interest for the greater good. More broadly, Federalist No. 1 raises existential questions of political philosophy, as it makes a distinction between political autonomy and path dependence. Hamilton suggested that path dependence can be overcome not just through sheer will, but by rejecting passions and making decisions through reason.

Hamilton presented a general concept of good government in Federalist No. 1. In public life, Hamilton was an advocate of strong government that he described as the "energetic executive", and he believed that fears of despotism were disproportionate to the risk. Hamilton feared a democracy in which the people had too much power relative to the government, expressing the common belief at the time that democracy was undesirable as it created demagogues and tyrants. He considered the alternative to strong central government to be a people whose fate is determined by "accident and force" rather than their own will, ruled arbitrarily by aristocracy, monarchy, or anarchism rather than a republic governed by reason, which he considered to be the best form of government.

== Aftermath ==
Many of the arguments and rhetorical approaches of Federalist No. 1 are reused throughout the series, including the use of historical examples, the explicit challenge of opponents that had concerns about a centralized government, asking the reader to prioritize reason over emotion, presenting legal and moral dilemmas as having correct answers, acknowledging that both selfish and selfless factors would affect people's decisions, and expressing preference for disinterested leadership and strong government. Not all of the topics described in Federalist No. 1 were addressed in subsequent entries. The final entry, Federalist No. 85, included an apology for failing to cover "the analogy of the proposed government to your own state constitution" and "the additional security, which its adoption will afford to republican government, to liberty and to property".

Hamilton and his co-authors later became powerful figures within the new centralized government, creating a possible contradiction with his statement in Federalist No. 1 that self interest was not a factor in his decision to ratify as well as his condemnation of those who made their decision purely to attain power. While serving as Secretary of the Treasury, Hamilton acted on his ideas of good government, expanding the scope and bureaucracy of his department. Jefferson later sought to reform many of these changes. Over the follow centuries, additional major changes were made to the constitution, the most influential of which, the 13th and 14th amendments, were adopted as a condition at the end of the American Civil War rather than through the discourse that Hamilton advocated. Since the publication of the Federalist Papers and the ratification of the constitution, the concept of government has changed, both in the range of its responsibilities and in how politics is conducted.
