= Cato's Letters (Antifederalist) =

Cato's Letters were a series of Anti-Federalist letters to the New York Journal in 1787 and 1788 opposing James Madison's views and urging against ratification of the United States Constitution.

It formed part of the Anti-Federalist Papers. Alexander Hamilton published responses to these letters under the pseudonym "Caesar."

== Authorship ==
Many historians identify George Clinton as the author, although this is disputed.

== Sources ==
- Johnson, Joel A. (October 2008). "'Brutus' and 'Cato Unmasked: General John Williams' Role in the New York Ratification Debate, 1787-88" (PDF). Proceedings of the American Antiquarian Society. 118 (2): 297–337.
