= Federalist No. 35 =

Federalist Paper by Alexander Hamilton on taxation

- Alexander Hamilton, author of Federalist No. 35
- Author: Alexander Hamilton
- Original title: The Same Subject Continued: Concerning the General Power of Taxation
- Language: English
- Series: The Federalist
- Publisher: The Independent Journal
- Publication date: January 5, 1788
- Publication place: United States
- Media type: Newspaper
- Preceded by: Federalist No. 34
- Followed by: Federalist No. 36

Federalist No. 35 is an essay by Alexander Hamilton, the thirty-fifth of The Federalist Papers. It was first published in The Independent Journal on January 5, 1788 under the pseudonym Publius, the name under which all The Federalist papers were published. This is the sixth of seven essays by Hamilton on the controversial issue of taxation. It is titled "The Same Subject Continued: Concerning the General Power of Taxation".

== Summary ==
In this essay, Hamilton argues that if the federal government's powers of taxation were confined to certain objects, it would place strain on those objects, especially in times of great need. This, he says, is dangerous to the economy as well as the government's source of revenue. In the interest of revenue itself, the government would be prevented from exceeding limits on articles, as it would destroy the market for that article. He later argues against a proposal that there should be a representative from each class of the economy. He says that the economy is far too interconnected to necessitate such a system.

Hamilton proposes that there are two evils that would result from the certain confinement of taxation in the Union – one being the oppression of particular types of industry and the other one being the unequal distribution of the taxes, among different states and among people.
