= Federalist No. 4 =

Federalist Paper by John Jay

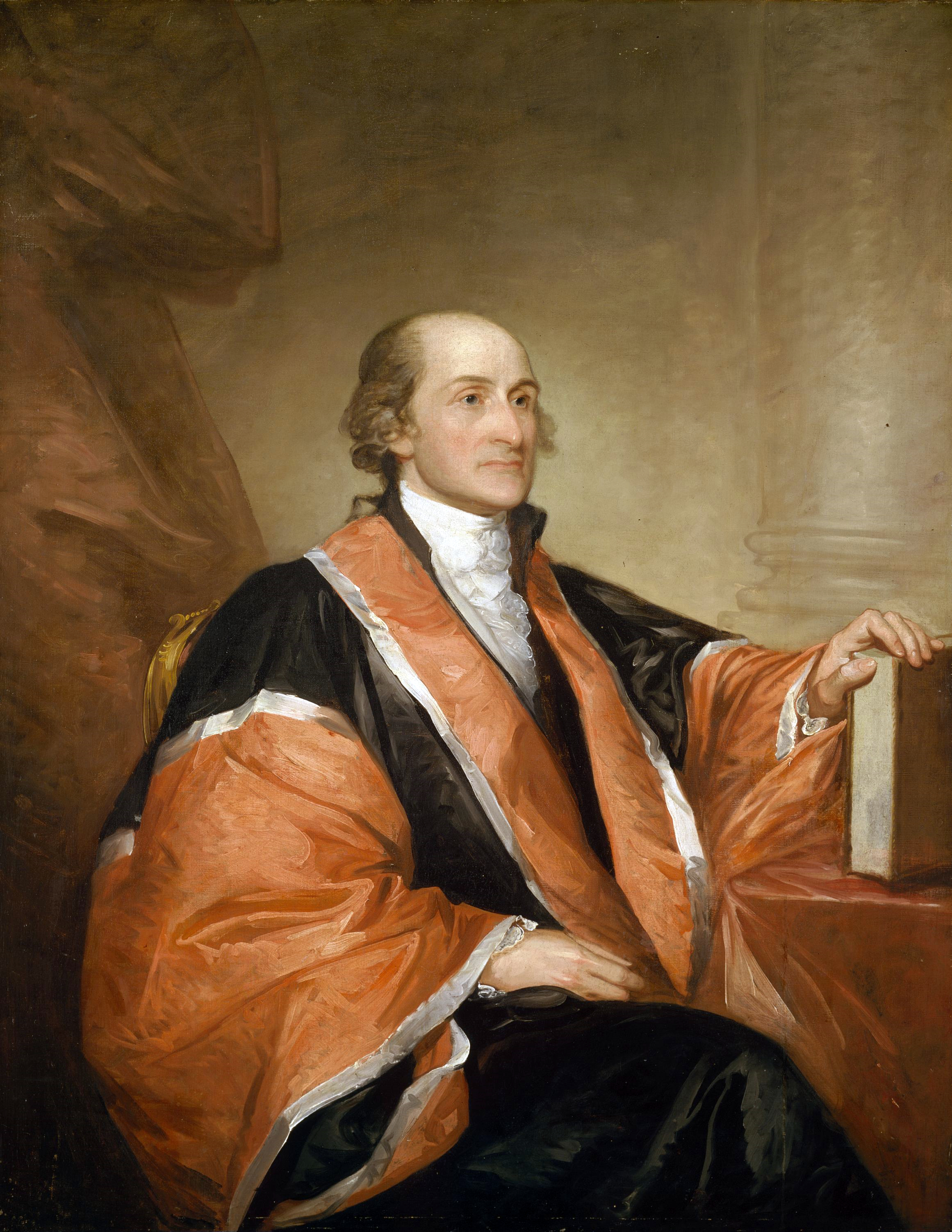
- John Jay, author of Federalist No. 4
- Author: John Jay
- Original title: The Same Subject Continued: Concerning Dangers from Foreign Force and Influence
- Language: English
- Series: The Federalist
- Publisher: The Independent Journal
- Publication date: November 7, 1787
- Publication place: United States
- Media type: Newspaper
- Preceded by: Federalist No. 3
- Followed by: Federalist No. 5
- Text: Federalist No. 4 at Wikisource

Federalist No. 4, titled "The Same Subject Continued: Concerning Dangers from Foreign Force and Influence", is a political essay by John Jay and the fourth of The Federalist Papers. It was first published in The Independent Journal on November 7, 1787, under the pseudonym Publius, the name under which all The Federalist Papers were published. It is the third of four essays by Jay discussing the protection of the United States from dangerous foreign influence and military conflict. It directly continued the argument made in Federalist No. 3, and it was further continued in Federalist No. 5.

Federalist No. 4 addresses the possibility of European nations engaging in wars of aggression against the United States. Jay argued that union between the states would prevent foreign nations from conquering the United States or causing division between the states, citing the advantages of a unified militia over several disparate forces and the ability of a federal government to consider the interests of all the states. Federalist No. 4 represents a strong example of Jay's preference for centralized government and his skepticism of individual state governments. Since the ratification of the Constitution of the United States, foreign attacks against the United States have been exceedingly rare.

== Summary ==
Jay begins by explaining that the United States must prevent itself from being the target of unjust war. He says that nations could seek war any time that there is benefit in doing so. He considers that an absolute monarch might seek war for personal reasons, such as glory, revenge, or ambition. He also describes an economic incentive for nations to come into conflict with the United States to maintain control over international trade. He concludes from these reasons that any advancement of the United States will draw the attention of European nations and increase diplomatic tensions.

Jay argues that to prevent conflict with European nations, the United States must strengthen its national government through union of the states. He uses the British Armed Forces and British militias as an example, citing their strength as a unified force rather than being the individual forces of England, Scotland, and Wales. He argues that a combined militia under a single federal government would be far more effective than separate state militias, saying that an American militia could protect any part of the country that was under threat by concentrating its resources there. This, Jay says, is not true for thirteen individual militias.

Jay also warns against political interference from European powers. He says that if America were split into three or four confederacies, they might each be supported by a different European nation, such as Britain, France, and Spain. These confederacies could then easily be motivated to ignore conflicts in the others or even to fight each other on behalf of the European powers. He concludes the essay by warning that internal division would do harm to the United States.

== Background and publication ==
Federalist No. 4 was written by John Jay. Following the Constitutional Convention in 1787, Hamilton worked with James Madison and Alexander Hamilton to write a series of essays to explain the provisions of the Constitution of the United States and persuade New York to ratify it. They published these essays in New York newspapers under the shared pseudonym Publius. It was first published in the Independent Journal on November 7, 1787, followed by the Daily Advertiser on November 8 and the New-York Packet on November 9. In the latter paper, it was incorrectly labeled Federalist No. 3. Federalist No. 4 continued the argument from Federalist No. 3. While No. 3 advocated for union to protect from just war, No. 4 advanced this idea by arguing that union also protects from unjust war. No. 4 reinforced and complemented many of the ideas presented in No. 3, establishing a dual argument for union to protect from foreign conflict.

== Analysis ==
In Federalist No. 4, Jay argued that a unified federal government was necessary to protect the states from foreign conquest. He worried that without union between the states, other nations may be incentivized to wage war, as there would be no federal administration to organize the states and economic advantages would be easier to seize. Jay considered it to be in a state's interest not only to protect its own security, but to protect that of the other states as well. His conception of government in this sense is similar to that of Thomas Hobbes and John Locke, identifying it as an alliance of mutual preservation. Throughout the essay, Jay reiterates his support for centralized government, going so far as to refer to the states as a family.

Jay contended that people are naturally prone to conflict. He held a negative opinion of human nature and was frustrated in his belief that egoism was a driving force in decision making. Jay's focus on self-interested conflict marked a point of divergence from Federalist No. 3, where Jay considered only just causes for war. Jay argued in Federalist No. 4 that union was a means of preventing conflict. He suggested that a unified federal government would make foreign powers hesitant to engage with force, and he warned that disunity between the states would invite such conflict. Likewise, he proposed that a united federal government would incentivize foreign nations to develop a better relationship with the United States. This belief was informed both by historical examples and by conflicts from Jay's own lifetime. He supported his argument by describing potential causes for an unjust war against the states, including the whims of absolute monarchs and conflicts surrounding trade rivalries.

Should war take place, Jay believed that a federal government would provide advantages over individual state governments. It would have access to a larger population from which to draw leaders, states would be more willing to protect one another, and a federal government would be more inclined to negotiate treaties such that all states benefited. Jay's arguments in this essay may be interpreted as reflecting upon the American Revolutionary War. In apparent contradiction to his argument, the Revolutionary War provided an example of the thirteen states protecting one another in a military conflict without a federal government. It was also an example, however, of the need for a unified military between the states to protect from "unjust attacks". The risk of conflict with European powers was especially prominent in Jay's time, as the British Empire and the Spanish Empire held colonial territories bordering the United States. Jay also compared union in the United States to the union of Great Britain that the states fought against, arguing that the same principles apply. In this example, he also expressed support for the mercantilist Navigation Acts.

Jay made a strong distinction in Federalist No. 4 between a federal government and individual state governments, even more so than in the other Federalist Papers. His depiction of the federal government was one of an ideal government, while he considered the state governments to be lacking accountability and subservient to great powers such as the Britain, Spain, and France. Jay concluded Federalist No. 4 with a warning against internal division, assuring that it would lead to failure. By doing so, he stated more explicitly what he had only implied in the previous essay: that he believed confederation was not viable and that it would inevitably cause separation between the states.

== Aftermath ==
Jay continued his argument in Federalist No. 5, which reiterated the main arguments of Federalist No. 4. Alexander Hamilton would later reiterate the support for British mercantilism that was expressed in this essay. Since the federal government of the United States was formed, it has largely been successful in deterring foreign attack. As of 2015, the only significant exceptions were the War of 1812, the attack on Pearl Harbor, and the September 11 attacks. In the 21st century, the United States does not face a significant threat from an invasion or conventional warfare, with the only major threats being those of cyberwarfare and weapons of mass destruction, including that of terrorist groups in addition to that of adversarial states. The United States has also sought to increase its use of mutual protection by participating in international organizations such as the North American Free Trade Agreement, NATO, and the United Nations.
