= Letters of Centinel =

Letters of Centinel is a series of letters written by Samuel Bryan important in the Anti-Federalist movement and American political thought.

== Centinel ==
"Centinel" was an alias used to write a series of 18 articles that were printed in the Philadelphia Independent Gazetteer and the Philadelphia Freeman's Journal between October 5, 1787, and April 9, 1788.

It is generally accepted by historians that the majority of these articles were written by Samuel Bryan. However, some may have been written by his father George Bryan and by Eleazer Oswald of the Independent Gazetteer.
