= Brutus (antifederalist) =

Pen name of essay-writing Anti-Federalist

Brutus was the pen name of an Anti-Federalist in a series of essays designed to encourage New Yorkers to reject the proposed Constitution. His essays are considered among the best of those written to oppose adoption of the proposed constitution. They paralleled and confronted The Federalist Papers during the ratification fight over the Constitution. Brutus published 16 essays in the New-York Journal, and Weekly Register, beginning shortly before The Federalist started appearing in New York newspapers. The essays were widely reprinted and commented on throughout the American states. All 16 of the essays were addressed to "the Citizens of the State of New York".

The true identity of Brutus was unknown. For many years, Robert Yates was seen as the most likely writer, but more recent scholarship had suggested either Melancton Smith of Poughkeepsie or John Williams of Salem. A computational analysis of the known writings of Smith suggested that either he or an associate was the author of the Brutus papers, though there were also strong similarities between the works of Williams and Brutus.

In 2025, new evidence was discovered confirming that Melancton Smith was Brutus and Elbridge Gerry was the Federal Farmer. Similarities between their early essays are readily explained by collaboration between the two Antifederalist allies. The pen name is in honor of either Lucius Junius Brutus, who led the overthrow of the last Roman King Lucius Tarquinius Superbus, or Marcus Junius Brutus, who was one of Julius Caesar's assassins.

== Arguments against the Constitution ==
=== People's liberties ===
Like other Anti-Federalist writers, he argued in Brutus 1 that a bill of rights was necessary to protect the people from the government. He urged the people of New York not to ratify the Constitution and therefore give up powers to the government because "when the people once part with power, they can seldom or never resume it again but by force." In his view, Americans believe "that all men by nature are free" and the new Constitution requires them to give up too many rights which "counteracts the very end of government". To alleviate this issue, a bill of rights that considers criminal rights, free elections, and freedom of press must be included.

=== Legislative branch ===
==== Powers ====
Brutus writes that Congress possesses far too much power, especially over the states. He prefers a true confederation, which would be "a number of independent states entering, for conducting certain general concerns, in which they have a common interest, leaving the management of their internal and local affairs to go and their separate governments".

He believes the power to hold a standing army in peacetime as evil and highly dangerous to public liberty. Congress' unlimited power to collect revenue and to "borrow money on the credit of the United States" as well as the Necessary and Proper Clause, are highly dangerous to the states, and Brutus believes they will eventually be dissolved if the Constitution is adopted.

==== Representation ====
Brutus argues that a free republic cannot exist in such a large territory as the United States. He uses the examples of the Greek and Roman republics that became tyrannical as their territory grew. He states that a true free republic comes from the people, not representatives of the people. With the population and geographical size of the United States, he warns that citizens "will have very little acquaintance with those who may be chosen to represent them; a great part of them will, probably, not know the characters of their own members, much less that of a majority of those who will compose the federal assembly; they will consist of men, whose names they have never heard, and whose talents and regard for the public good, they are total strangers to." He also sees danger in giving Congress the power to modify the election of its own members.

Brutus also questions the validity of the Three-fifths Compromise and asks "If [slaves] have no share in government. why is the number of members in the assembly, to be increased on their account?" He sees this as one example of the corruption of the branch. The fact that each state, regardless of size, will have the same number of senators "is the only feature of any importance in the constitution of a confederated government" and, is one of the few aspects of the legislature that Brutus approves of (16). He disagrees with the method of electing senators as well as the six-year term they are given as he believes spending that much time away from his constituents will make him less in touch with their interests (16). He advocates for a rotation in government to avoid the problem of men serving in the Senate for life. He also objects to Congress taking part in appointing officers and impeachment as it gives them both executive and judicial powers and he deems such blurring of the branches as dangerous (16).

==== Judiciary branch ====
Brutus argues that the power given to the judiciary will extend legislative authority, increase the jurisdiction of the courts, and diminish and destroy both the legislative and judiciary powers of the states. He believes that their ability to declare what the powers of the legislature will lead to revision of legislative power, especially because the Supreme Court can interpret the Constitution according to its "spirit and reason" and will not be bound by its words alone. Like in Britain, this will allow them to "mold the government into almost any shape they please". Their ability to deem the validity of state legislation overrides the state judiciaries and will eventually make them so "trifling and unimportant, as not to be worth having". He also thinks there should be more checks on the branch and judges should not only be removed on the basis of crime. He writes that "no way is left to control them but with a high hand and an outstretched arm".
