= Samuel Bryan =

- Born: September 30, 1759; Philadelphia, Pennsylvania, British America
- Died: October 6, 1821 (aged 62); Chester County, Pennsylvania, U.S.
- Occupation: Anti-Federalist author in Pennsylvania

Samuel Bryan (September 30, 1759 in Philadelphia — October 6, 1821 in Chester County, Pennsylvania) was a resident of the Province of Pennsylvania and an Anti-Federalist author who wrote during the Confederation period. Historians generally ascribe to Bryan the letters written under the pseudonym Centinel between 1787 and 1789. Centinel attacked the proposed Constitution of the United States as a document in the interests of the "well-born few".

Bryan was the son of George Bryan, a Pennsylvania Supreme Court judge and the principal Anti-Federalist in the state, to whom the essays were frequently attributed at the time.

Centinel wrote three series of essays. The first eighteen numbers appeared in late 1787 and early 1788, and reflected the Anti-Federalist opposition to the Constitution. Letters XIX through XXIV were produced toward the end of 1788. By this time, the Constitution had been adopted, and these essays sought to sway the election of representatives to the new government. In 1789, a final series of 69 papers appeared regarding proposed amendments to the Constitution.

== Political career ==
In 1784, Bryan became the secretary of the Pennsylvania Council of Censors, and was elected clerk of the state assembly in 1785.

In 1790, he ran for the office of clerk of the state senate, but lost. In 1795, Bryan was appointed state register general by Pennsylvania governor Thomas Mifflin. In 1801, he became state comptroller general. In 1807, he lost a race for Pennsylvania state treasurer.

From 1809 to 1821, Bryan served as Philadelphia's register of wills.
