= George Dole =

George Dole may refer to:

- George Dole (wrestler) (1885–1928), American wrestler
- George W. Dole (1800–1860), American businessman and early settler of Chicago

== See also ==
- George P. Doles (1830–1864), American businessman and Confederate general
