= 1833 Treaty of Chicago =

U.S. agreement with the Chippewa, Odawa, and Potawatomi tribes

Treaty Between the United States and the United Chippewa, Ottawa and Potawatomi Indians
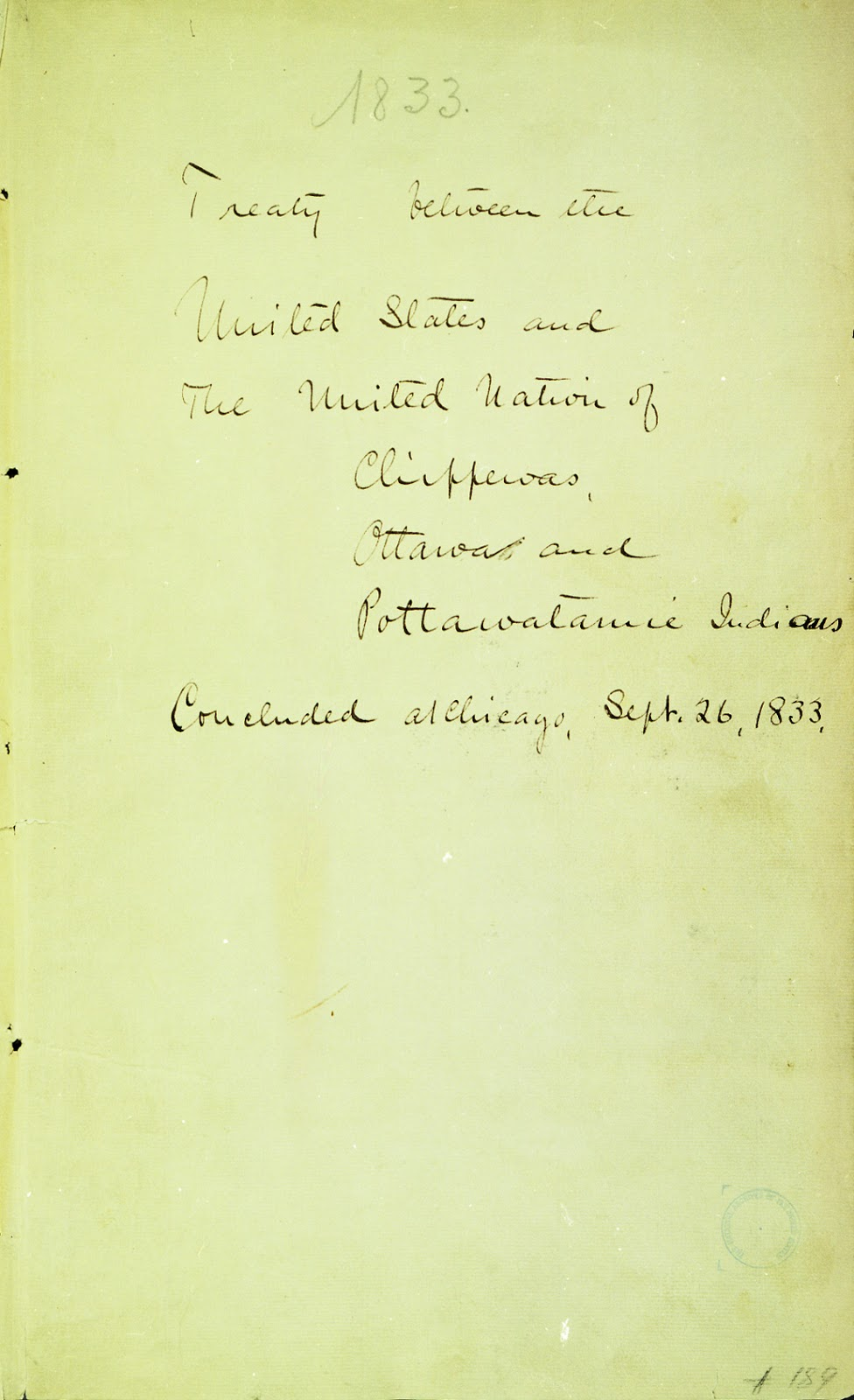
- Cover page of the treaty
- Type: Cession treaty
- Context: Cession/Indian removal treaty that was negotiated after the 1830 passage of the Indian Removal Act
- Signed: September 26, 1833 (treaty); September 27, 1833 (supplemental articles)
- Location: Chicago, Illinois
- Ratified: February 21, 1835
- Negotiators: George Bryan Porter (United States); Thomas Jefferson Vance Owen United States); William Weatherford (United States); Various Chippewa, Ottawa and Potawatomi chiefs and leaders
- Original signatories: George Bryan Porter (United States); Thomas Jefferson Vance Owen United States); William Weatherford (United States); Various Chippewa, Ottawa and Potawatomi chiefs and leaders
- Signatories: Andrew Jackson (president of the United States)
- Parties: United States Government and the Chippewa, Odawa, and Potawatomi tribes

The 1833 Treaty of Chicago was an agreement between the United States government and the Chippewa, Odawa, and Potawatomi tribes. It required them to cede to the United States government their 5,000,000 acres (2,000,000 ha) of land (including reservations) in Illinois and the Michigan Territory (which then included Wisconsin and part of Minnesota) to move west of the Mississippi River. In return, the tribes were given promises of various cash payments and tracts of land west of the Mississippi River. The treaty was one of the removal treaties to come after the passage of the Indian Removal Act. It was the second treaty referred to as the "Treaty of Chicago," after the 1821 Treaty of Chicago.

== Background ==
The negotiation of the cession treaty came roughly three years after the United States government ratified the Indian Removal Act. While many cession treaties had previously been negotiated between the United States government and Native American tribes during the late 18th century and the early 19th century, those that were negotiated after the ratification of the Indian Removal Act differed by usually including stipulations requiring that required Native American tribes that were parties to the treaties to move west of the Mississippi River. In such post-Indian Removal Act cession treaties, the United States government agreed to compensate tribes for their lands, liquidate their debts, and assist them in establishing a new permanent settlement west of the Mississippi. The Chicago Treaty of 1833 was typical of such treaties.

One of the impetuses for the treaty were rumors that had arisen in the aftermath of the 1832 Black Hawk War that Native Americans were coming into conflict with the settlers arriving in Illinois. The number of settlers arriving in Illinois and its surrounding area in search of farmland had increased after the 1825 opening of the Erie Canal, with the canal having opened up an easier route to travel Illinois from the Eastern United States via the Great Lakes. Illinois residents pressured the government to remove the Indians from the land they occupied in the state, which would make that land instead available to settlers. One of the ways in which advocates applied pressure was by making regular reports to complain of misconduct and hostility from the Native peoples. These reports were relayed by John Reynolds to the United States Department of War. The reports delivered by Reynolds and the reports made by investigators that Reynolds tasked with examining this state of affairs were founded entirely on second-hand accounts. Officials that were closer to the situation gave accounts that contradict the reports of native misconduct and aggression. Thomas Jefferson Vance Owen (the United States government's Indian agent in Chicago and the president of the Chicago Town Board of Trustees), General Winfield Scott, and George Bryan Porter (the territorial governor of Michigan) all communicated to the Office of Indian Affairs that the rumors and newspaper stories covering them were untrue and unfair.

In early 1833, the Office of Indian Affairs began exploring the prospect of removing the Potawatomi. Elbert Herring (the commissioner of Indian affairs) and Lewis Cass (the United States secretary of war) ordered several figures to find land that could be used to house removed the Potawatomi, Odawa, and Chippewa populations "should they consent to remove." Among those who receive such instructions were Montfort Stokes, Henry Leavitt Ellsworth, and John F. Schermerhorn. The latter had been previously involved in the relocation of the Potawatomi of Indiana to land west of the Mississippi River.

In a March 5, 1833 letter, Chicago Indian Agent Owen told Herring that, after having spoken with the, "most intelligent and influential" native chiefs, he had concluded that it was very unlikely that they would agree to cede all of their lands. His letter declared that he believed that they could be induced to move west only if they were first permitted to have a delegation travel to inspect the land they would be moving to first and that they would be "unwilling to make any exchange until they are satisfied of the fact that their new home and country possessed advantages not inferior to those incident to" the land they already occupied. He opined that Potawatomi land cession would be expensive to secure. A copy of the letter was also sent to Governor Porter, who expressed the belief that the spending of great expenses would be justified if it secured the cession of the Potawatomi from their lands. Porter also believed that the government could recoup its expense when it would sell the land to settlers. He also suggested that Michigan Territory could possibly secure a cession of the few remaining plots of land in the territory that were still controlled by Native Americans.

== Negotiations ==
The federal government decided for there to be treaty negotiations with the Potawatomi, Odawa, Chippewa, and Kickapoo natives. Chicago, then a town in the state of Illinois was selected as the site for a treaty to be negotiated, as it had already long established itself as a consequential trading center, was home to the Fort Dearborn garrison, and was a traditional Potawatomi resort. On April 6, 1833, Commissioner of Indian Affairs Herring informed Chicago Indian Agent Owen that the United States Congress had approved the appropriation of $10,000 (equivalent to $355,000 in 2025) needed to hold the treaty negotiations. Owen took charge of planning the meeting. In preparation for the meeting, a large open arbor was built in Chicago at the corner of Rush Street and Michigan Avenue to be used as a council house during the meeting.

On April 8, 1833, Secretary of War Cass appointed the commissioners for the negotiations, naming Michigan Territory Governor Porter, Chicago Indian Agent Thomas Jefferson Vance Owen, and Colonel William Weatherford. Weatherford, who served to represent the people of Illinois in the investigation, ultimately played a relatively negligible role in the negotiations. Secretary Cass instructed the commissioners to work to secure the clearance of the entire region of Native American land claims. Cass called the objective

An event equally desirable for us as for them; as it is not possible that they can retain their present position much longer, pressed as they will be by our settlements, and exposed to all the evils which these produce.

Cass gave the commissioners warnings that he believed other treasuries for treaties had been excessively expensive, with too many individuals receiving gratuities. Furthermore, Cass declared that no liquor should be involved in the dealings of the treaty's treasury and that its location should be on Native American territory and placed under the protection of the Army's commanding officer at Fort Dearborn.

William Lee D. Ewing served as secretary for the commissioners.

Plans to facilitate the travel of a Native American delegation to inspect land West of the Mississippi ahead of the negotiations were scrapped after appropriations for such an undertaking failed to come through. Porter, who believed that would increase the difficulty of negotiating the treaty, requested in an August 23, 1833, to John F. Schermerhorn for Schermerhorn to travel to Chicago to help with the negotiations by sharing his expert knowledge about land west of the Mississippi. Schermerhorn would come to during the meetings, staying from September 22 through September 26, 1833.

During the meeting, it was estimated that 3,000 out-of-town visitors descended on Chicago, including Native Americans, government officials, troops of the United States Army, land speculators, and other travelers to witness the proceedings unfold. At the time, Chicago was just a small village with merely 150 buildings. Thousands of Native Americans descended on the city in the week that the meeting started. Among the non-Natives who came to Chicago were those who saw the trial as important to the interests of their personal profit, including, "men pursuing Indian claims, some for tracts of land,... creditors of the tribes, or of particular Indians, who know that they have no chance of getting their money, if they do not get it from Government agents." While traders worked hard to influence the treaty, it appears that they had very little influence on the actual terms reached. During the meeting, there was much unruliness among the many visitors who had flocked to the city.

The meeting was held between September 10 and October 7, 1833. Formal proceedings of negotiations were originally scheduled to begin on September 12, 1833. However, the Native Americans, who were in no hurry to start the assembly, caused that to be delayed, and the first day of the council for the negotiations was held on September 14. At the beginning of the proceedings, a fire was kindled inside of the council house, and a peace pipe was passed between the federal government's commissioners and the chief and head men of the Native tribes.

While the natives were against the cession of their land, it was clear from past experiences that the United States government would not take "no" for an answer once it had decided that it wanted to see Natives cede their land. Therefore, the Natives likely saw it as in their best interests to strike a bargain, despite their desire to remain on their existing lands.

An initial version of the treaty was agreed to on September 26, 1833. Supplementary articles were agreed to the following day. After the treaty was agreed to, the commissioners gave medals to a number of Native chiefs. From September 30 through October 4, 1833, the commissioners examined claims that individuals held against the Natives. From October 5 to 6, they created a statement of their accounts and checked invoices.

Porter, who had been enthusiastic in his role in creating and finalizing the treaty, wrote a letter to Lewis Cass to report the completion of the treaty. In it, he also suggested that the United States act fast to remove from Native possession remaining small reservations; "thus this whole country may probably be altogether relieved from any serious impediment to its entire settlement, by the removal of a population which will always embarrass and retard it."

== Signatories and witnesses ==
Signatories on behalf of the United states government (in the order listed on the treaty)
  - George Bryan Porter (governor of the Michigan Territory and commissioner for the negotiations)
  - Thomas Jefferson Vance Owen (Indian agent at Chicago, president of the Board of Trustees of the Town of Chicago, and commissioner for the negotiations)
  - William Weatherford (commissioner for the negotiations)

Signatories on behalf of the Native tribes (in the order listed on the treaty)
  - To-pen-e-bee,
  - Sau-ko-noek
  - Che-che-bin-quay (Alexander Robinson)
  - Joseph
  - Wah-mix-i-co
  - Ob-wa-qua-unk
  - N-saw-way-quet
  - Puk-quech-a-min-nee
  - Nah-che-wine
  - Ke-wase
  - Wah-bou-seh (Waubonsie)
  - Mang-e-sett (Big Foot)
  - Caw-we-saut
  - Ah-be-te-ke-zhic (Aptakisic, also known as Half Day)
  - Pat-e-go-shuc
  - E-to-wow-cote
  - Shim-e-nah
  - O-chee-pwaise
  - Ce-nah-ge-win
  - Shaw-waw-nas-see
  - Shab-eh-nay (Shabbona)
  - Mac-a-ta-o-shic
  - Squah-ke-zic
  - Mah-che-o-tah-way
  - Cha-ke-te-ah
  - Me-am-ese
  - Shay-tee
  - Kee-new
  - Ne-bay-noc-scum
  - Naw-bay-caw
  - O'Kee-mase
  - Saw-o-tup
  - Me-tai-way
  - Na-ma-ta-way-shuc
  - Shaw-waw-nuk-wuk
  - Nah-che-wah
  - Sho-bon-nier
  - Me-nuk-quet
  - Chis-in-ke-bah
  - Mix-e-maung
  - Nah-bwait
  - Sen-e-bau-um
  - Puk-won
  - Wa-be-no-say
  - Mon-tou-ish
  - No-nee
  - Mas-quat
  - Sho-min
  - Ah-take
  - He-me-nah-wah
  - Che-pec-co-quah
  - Mis-quab-o-no-quah
  - Wah-be-Kai
  - Ma-ca-ta-ke-shic
  - Sho-min, (2d.)
  - She-mah-gah
  - O'ke-mah-wah-ba-see
  - Na-mash
  - Shab-y-a-tuk
  - Ah-cah-o-mah
  - Quah-quah, tah
  - Ah-sag-a-mish-cum
  - Pa-mob-a-mee
  - Nay-o-say
  - Ce-tah-quah
  - Ce-ku-tay
  - Sauk-ee
  - Ah-quee-wee
  - Ta-cau-ko
  - Me-shim-e-nah
  - Wah-sus-kuk
  - Pe-nay-o-cat
  - Pay-maw-suc
  - Pe-she-ka
  - Shaw-we-mon-e-tay
  - Ah-be-nab
  - Sau-sau-quas-see

Witnesses (in the order listed on the treaty)
  - William Lee D. Ewing (secretary to commission for the negotiations)
  - E. A. Brush
  - Luther Rice (interpreter)
  - James Conner (interpreter)
  - John F. Schermerhorn (commissioner for Indian affairs)
  - A. C. Pepper (S. A. R. P.)
  - Gholson Kercheval (sub-agent)
  - George Bender (major in the 5th Infantry Regiment of the United States Army)
  - D. Wilcox (captain in the 5th Infantry Regiment of the United States Army)
  - J. M. Baxley (captain in the 5th Infantry Regiment of the United States Army)
  - R. A. Forsyth (of the United States Army)
  - L. T. Jamison (lieutenant in the United States Army)
  - E. K. Smith (lieutenant in the 5th Infantry Regiment of the United States Army)
  - P. Maxwell (assistant surgeon)
  - J. Allen (lieutenant in the 5th Infantry Regiment of the United States Army)
  - I. P. Simonton (lieutenant in the United States Army)
  - George F. Turner (assistant surgeon in the United States Army)
  - Richard J. Hamilton
  - Robert Stuart
  - Jona. McCarty
  - Daniel Jackson (of New York)
  - John H. Kinzie (former Cook County sheriff)
  - Robert. A. Kinzie
  - Gurdon Saltonstall Hubbard
  - J. C. Schwarz (adjutant general M. M.)
  - Jn. B. Beaubrier
  - James Kinzie
  - Jacob Beeson
  - Samuel Humes Porter
  - Andrew Porter
  - Gabriel Godfroy (a Waapanaakikaapwa)
  - A. H. Arndt,
  - Laurie Marsh
  - Joseph Chaunier
  - John Watkins
  - B. B. Kercheval
  - Jasper W. Berry
  - William French
  - Thomas Forsyth
  - Pierre Menard (fur trader and former lieutenant governor of Illinois)
  - Fils. Edmund Roberts
  - George Hunt
  - Isaac Nash

== Stipulations ==
The treaty ceded 5,000,000 acres (2,000,000 ha) of land to the United States government. It also stipulated that the Odawa, Chippewa, and Potawatomi would cede their lands in Illinois, the Wisconsin Territory, and the Michigan Territory in exchange for a sum of presents, certain annuities, liquidation of all their debt, and a tract of equal size in the Kansas Territory along the Missouri River, to where they were required move within three years. A September 27 supplemental article provided that part of the band living on Michigan reservations could, "on account of their religious creed," remove to L'Arbre Croche in northern Michigan and receive their proportional annuities there; Central Michigan University's Clarke Historical Library identifies this provision as covering four Catholic Potawatomi communities later known collectively as the Pokagon Band. The Potawatomi were the largest tribe in regards to population residing West of the Mississippi among the three tribes that were party to the treaty. The sum promised to the tribes was unprecedented for such a treaty. The treaty marked the cession of what was the last immense tract of Native American land that remained north of the Ohio River and east of the Mississippi River. That marked a landmark in accomplishing the Indian removal goals being pursued by President Andrew Jackson and the Office of Indian Affairs.

== Ratification and implementation ==
Commissioner Herring and Secretary Cass both considered the treaty to be a significant success for the United States. Herring told the opening of the Fall 1833 session of the United States Congress:

The treaty comes particularly commended in the fact of total cession without any reservation, thereby ensuring the prompt emigration of the Indians.

In a report to the president, Secretary Cass lauded that the Natives were better off west of the Mississippi, declaring that they were, "comfortable and contented" there. He also celebrated seeing the land north of the Ohio River and West of the Mississippi River "cleared of the embarrassments of Indian relations."

Despite the glowing endorsements of Secretary Cass and Secretary Herring, it soon became clear that the treaty would face strong opposition within the United States Senate. One reason was that immediately after the agreement was first reached in 1833, accusations of fraud and foul play alleging schemes of self-enrichment were made against individuals that had negotiated the treaty. Another reason was that United States Senators felt that Native treaties were beginning to cost too much.

The primary corruption allegation was the allegation that Governor Porter had shown favor to two families with connections to him, the Kinzies and the Forsyths. Members of those families were to profit a cumulative $100,000 (equivalent to $3,553,000 in 2025) from under terms of the treaty. It looked suspicious that each member of the Kinzie family earned nearly identical sums of money under the treaty's terms. Porter's connection to the Kinzies and Forsyths was further given bad optics with the fact that John J. Kinzie and B. B. Kerchavel (the latter being the husband of Maria Forsyth) had been given a virtual monopoly on furnishing goods to the treaty negotiation meetings for which they made a 50% profit. Additional, many government officials had been hosted at the Kinzie residence during the negotiations and had well-compensated the Kinzie for the accommodations. Porter made efforts to refute the allegations of wrongdoing.

Finding the Porter's refutations of the corruption allegations satisfactory, President Jackson submitted the treaty to the United States Senate on January 10, 1834, requesting that the Senate give its approval to the treaty. To address the allegations of corruption, Jackson recommended that an individual agent be sent to go to Chicago and investigate the claims there. The Senate referred the treaty to the Senate Committee on Indian Affairs. After giving due consideration to objections to the treaty, the committee decided that there was not a need for it to fight the treaty's ratification. On April 2, 1834, the committee submitted its report and recommendations to the full Senate. On October 1, 1834, alterations to the treaty were proposed.

On February 21, 1835, the Senate gave its consent to the treaty. The treaty was ratified that same day by the signature of President Jackson. The treaty's statute reference is 7 Stat., 431. On March 3, 1835, federal appropriations for the treaty were approved. The appropriations saw $1,032,689.53 (equivalent to $33,979,000 in 2025) allocated for grants provided by the treaty. A further $2,536.53 (equivalent to $83,000 in 2025) was appropriated to pay the balance exceeding the $10,000 previously appropriated to cover the costs incurred in spending related to facilitating the negotiations. $9,453 (equivalent to $311,000 in 2025) was appropriated to cover the expenses of an exploratory trip by fifty representatives of the Potawatomi to inspect the land they would be allotted west of the Mississippi.

In accordance with the treaty and the federal government's goals, the United States government acted to carry out the removal of members of the party Native American tribes out of the lands east of the Mississippi. As the treaty was ratified in 1835, it would be by 1838 that the Natives had to leave.

On August 31, 1835, before the residents of Chicago, in an act of defiance ahead of their impending removal, five-hundred Native American warriors gathered in Chicago in full dress and brandishing tomahawks and put on dramatic war dance displays. That was the last recorded war dance in the Chicago area.

A plaque in suburban Western Springs, Illinois, near its border with Indian Head Park at Plainfield and Wolf Roads, marks the location of an 1835 camp site for some of the final Native Americans to depart the Chicago area.

Some natives moved to northern Wisconsin, rather than moving west of the Mississippi. For years, only the Potawatomi that had moved west of the Mississippi to Kansas would receive the stipulated annuities from the United States government. However, the United States government moved to rectify that in 1913, when it paid the Wisconsin Potawatomi $447,339 (equivalent to $10,705,000 in 2025).

In 1838, the remaining Potawatomi in the Chicago region were forcibly removed from their village (which was burned) and marched over 660 miles at gunpoint from Indiana to Kansas. This event is referred to as the "Trail of Death".
