= Abraham G. Lansing =

American politician

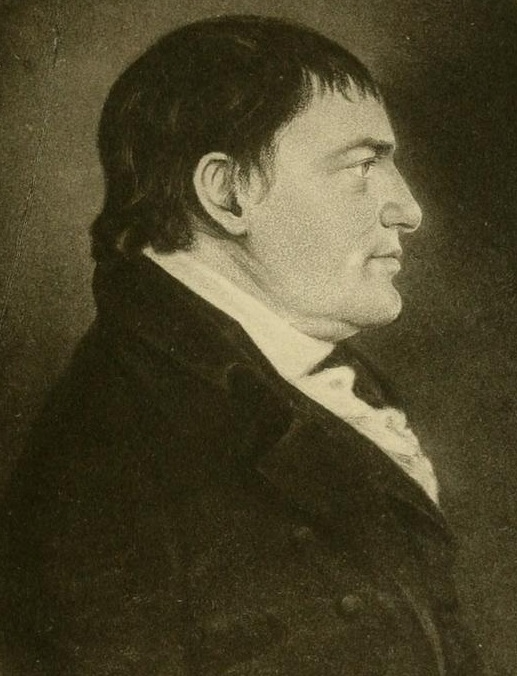

New York State Treasurer
- In office 1810–1812
- Governor: Daniel D. Tompkins
- Preceded by: David Thomas
- Succeeded by: David Thomas
- In office 1803–1808
- Governor: George Clinton; Morgan Lewis; Daniel D. Tompkins
- Preceded by: Robert McClellan
- Succeeded by: David Thomas

Personal details
- Born: Abraham Gerritse Lansing; December 12, 1756 Albany, Province of New York
- Died: May 15, 1834 (aged 77) Albany, New York
- Resting place: Albany Rural Cemetery
- Party: Democratic-Republican
- Spouse: Susanna Yates (m. 1779)
- Children: 14, including Gerrit
- Parent(s): Gerrit Jacobse Lansing; Jane Waters
- Relatives: John Lansing Jr. (brother); Abraham Yates (father-in-law)

Abraham Gerritse Lansing (December 12, 1756 in Albany, New York – May 15, 1834 in Albany, New York) was an American politician.

== Early life ==
Lansing was born on December 12, 1756, in Albany, New York. He was the son of Gerrit Jacobse Lansing (b. 1711) and his second wife Jannetje "Jane" (née Waters) Lansing (1728–1810). His brother was Chancellor John Lansing Jr. (1754–1829). Another brother, Sanders G. Lansing (1766–1850) married Catherine Ten Eyck (1769–1850), daughter of Abraham Ten Eyck (1744–1824) and Annatje (née Lansing) Ten Eyck (1746–1823).

Through his brother Sanders, he was the uncle of Robert Lansing (1799–1878), a New York State Senator and the grandfather of U.S. Secretary of State Robert Lansing. His ancestor, Gerrit Frederickse Lansing, came to America in 1640 from Hasselt, Overijssel, the Netherlands.

== Career ==
During the American Revolutionary War, Lansing served in the Albany militia. In 1776, he was appointed firemaster. Similar to his older brother, his abilities as a clerk made him more useful in an office than on the battlefield. During his service in War, he was involved in the payment of accounts for New York State. Following the War, he was accorded a land bounty right for service in conjunction with his militia regiment.

After his marriage to Susanna Yates, he was closely associated with his father-in-law, Abraham Yates Jr., serving in 1780 as his deputy in the Loan Office.

=== Public office ===
He was Surrogate of Albany County from 1787 to 1808, and New York State Treasurer from 1803 to 1808, and from 1810 to 1812. Lansing also served on the New York State Board of Regents and was the private secretary to Governor Morgan Lewis. In 1802, Lansing was the Democratic-Republican nominee in the 9th congressional district, losing to Federalist incumbent Killian K. Van Rensselaer.

== Personal life ==
Coat of Arms of Abraham G. Lansing

On April 9, 1779, he married Susanna Yates (1762–1840), the daughter of Abraham Yates (1724–1796), in Albany. They lived at the house built by his father-in-law at what became 358 North Market Street, in Albany. Together, they had fourteen children, including:

- Jannetje Lansing (1780–1830), who died unmarried.
- Abraham Lansing (b. 1782), who died young.
- Gerrit Yates Lansing (1783–1862), a member of the U.S. House of Representatives who married Helen Ten Eyck (1787–1838), the daughter of Abraham Ten Eyck, on May 31, 1808.
- Cornelius de Rider Lansing (1785–1849).
- John Lansing (b. 1788), who died unmarried.
- Antje Lansing (1790–1792), who died young.
- Sanders Lansing Jr. (1792–1866), who married Angelica Schuyler (1796–1863) in 1821.
- Christopher Yates Lansing (1796–1872), who married Caroline Mary Thomas (1805–1845)
- Anna Lansing (1799–1830), who married Rev. Walter Monteath (1788–1834).
- Sarah B. Lansing (b. 1802), died unmarried.
- Susan Lansing (1804–1874), who married Peter Gansevoort (1788–1876) on December 12, 1843.
- Barent Bleecker Lansing, married Philanda Orcutt.
- George Lansing, married Harriet Schermerhorn (1815–1886), daughter of John F. Schermerhorn (1786–1851).
- Abraham Yates Lansing (1808–1857), who married Eliza Van Alstyne (b. 1808) on April 26, 1836.

Lansing died on May 15, 1834, in Albany, New York. He was buried at the Albany Rural Cemetery in Menands, New York.

=== Descendants ===
Through his son Christopher, he was the grandfather of Abraham Lansing (1835–1899), acting New York State Treasurer and a member of the New York State Senate from 1882 to 1883.

Political offices
Preceded by Robert McClellan	New York State Treasurer; 1803–1808	Succeeded by David Thomas
Preceded by David Thomas	New York State Treasurer; 1810–1812	Succeeded by David Thomas
