= Abraham Yates Jr. =

American lawyer, civil servant, and pamphleteer (1724–1796)

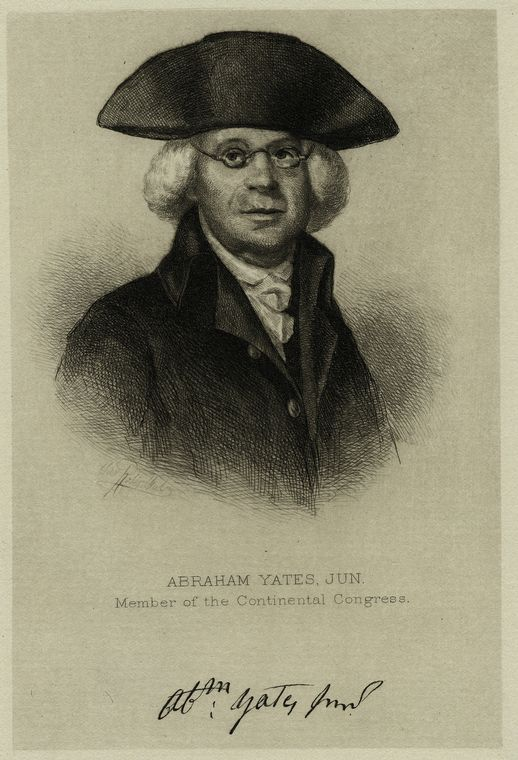

Mayor of Albany, New York
- In office 1790 – June 30, 1796
- Preceded by: John Lansing Jr.
- Succeeded by: Abraham Ten Broeck

Member of the New York State Senate from the Western District
- In office September 9, 1777 – June 30, 1790
- Preceded by: Inaugural holder
- Succeeded by: Stephen Van Rensselaer

Personal details
- Born: August 23, 1724 Albany, Province of New York, British America
- Died: June 30, 1796 (aged 71) Albany, New York, United States
- Party: Anti-Federalist
- Spouse: Antje De Ridder (m. 1746; died 1765)
- Relations: Robert Yates (nephew); Peter Waldron Yates (nephew); Gerrit Y. Lansing (grandson)
- Children: 5
- Occupation: Lawyer, politician

Abraham Yates Jr. (August 23, 1724 – June 30, 1796) was an American lawyer, civil servant, and pamphleteer from Albany, New York.

== Early life ==
Yates was born on August 23, 1724, in Albany, New York. He was the ninth child born to Christoffel Yates, a prosperous farmer and blacksmith, and Catelyntje Winne. His siblings included Joseph Yates, a merchant, and John G. Yates, a blacksmith.

His paternal grandparents were Joseph Yates and Albany native Huybertie (née Marselis) Yates. His nephew Robert Yates represented New York at the Philadelphia Convention. Another nephew was Continental Congressman Peter Waldron Yates.

== Career ==
After completing preparatory school, Yates was apprenticed to a shoemaker, which later led his political foes to call him a "crude cobbler" and Philip Schuyler to deride him as the "late cobbler of laws and old shoes". An ambitious man, he went on to become a surveyor, investing in land, and then studied law with Peter Silvester, setting up a successful law practice. Eventually, Yates was appointed the Sheriff of Albany, serving from 1754 until 1759 under the agency of Robert Livingston Jr.

From 1754 until 1773, he was elected and served on the Albany City Council where he was closely associated with the populist George Clinton (who eventually became the Vice President of the United States). Yates' election was notable as the council was generally made up of wealthy merchants and he was the sole lawyer among the group, and was known for his attacks against the patrician landowners of the era and support for small farmers. He was also known to be a forceful opponent of British oppression.

From 1774 to 1776, he was the chairman of the Albany Committee of Correspondence. Yates was also a member of the New York Provincial Congress from 1775 to 1777, serving as president pro tempore on November 2, 1775, August 10, 1776, and was its chairman in 1776 and 1777.

Yates was a delegate for New York to the Congress of the Confederation in 1787 and 1788, and won a reputation as a "churlish delegate who often cast the only 'nay'" vote. Yates was the solitary vote against the Northwest Ordinance for its gross violation of Native American rights. He argued against "the seizing on countries already peopled, and driving out or massacring the innocent and defenceless natives, merely because they differed from their invaders in language, religion, in customs, in government or in colour." He was also a member of the Council of Appointment in 1777–78 and again in 1784.

=== New York State Senate ===
Commencing on September 9, 1777, Yates was a member of the 1st New York State Legislature, having been elected to represent one of six seats for the Western District, which consisted of Albany and Tryon counties. He was re-elected several times and served thirteen consecutive sessions in the Senate until he declined re-election following his refusal to sign an oath to the U.S. Constitution. He was succeeded by Stephen Van Rensselaer. By the end of his time in the Senate, the Western District consisted of Albany, Columbia and Montgomery counties.

Yates, along with his fellow Anti-Federalist nephew Robert, with whom he shared the pen-name the "Rough Hewer", was a prolific pamphleteer. He was known for his strong Anti-Federalist writings around the encroachment of Federal powers over New York state affairs and his opposition to the ratification of the Constitution. Both Yates were prominent opponents of the nationalist Federalist Alexander Hamilton.

=== Mayor of Albany ===
Following his retirement from the State Senate, Yates old friend and the then New York Governor George Clinton appointed him as the mayor of Albany in 1790, a role he served in until his death in 1796. As mayor, Yates opposed and was a vocal critic of the Federalist John Jay (who succeeded Clinton as Governor and appointed Stephen Van Rensselaer as his Lt. Governor) following the Jay Treaty, which was a 1795 treaty between the U.S. and Great Britain which purportedly averted war between the countries and resolved issues remaining since the Treaty of Paris of 1783 (which ended the American Revolutionary War). The opposition led to the formation of the anti-Treaty Democratic Republican party in New York. During his term, oil street lamps were installed in Albany.

Yates was a presidential elector in 1792, and cast his votes for George Washington and George Clinton. In 1795, Yates was also a founding trustee of Union College.

== Personal life ==
In 1746, Yates was married to Antje De Ridder (1726–1795), the daughter of Cornelis De Ridder and Susanna (née Vandenbergh) De Ridder. Together, they were the parents of five children, Christoffel, another Christoffel, Tanneke, Cornelis, only one of whom survived to adulthood:

- Susanna Yates (1762–1840), who married New York State Treasurer Abraham G. Lansing, the brother of Chancellor John Lansing Jr. They lived in a house built by his Yates at what became 358 North Market Street in Albany.

Yates died in Albany on June 30, 1796, and was buried at Albany Rural Cemetery.

=== Descendants ===
Through his only surviving child Susanna, he was the grandfather of fourteen, including: Jannetje, who died unmarried; Abraham, who died young; Gerrit Yates, a member of the U.S. House of Representatives who married Helen Ten Eyck (daughter of Abraham Ten Eyck); Cornelius De Ridder; John, who died unmarried; Antje, who died young; Sanders Jr., who married Angelica Schuyler; Christopher Yates, who married Caroline Mary Thomas; Anna, who married Rev. Walter Monteath; Sarah B., who died unmarried; Susan, who married Peter Gansevoort; Barent Bleecker, who married Philanda Orcutt; George, married Harriet Schermerhorn (daughter of John F. Schermerhorn). and Abraham Yates, who married Eliza Van Alstyne.
