= Jacob Cuyler (silversmith) =

American silversmith

Jacob J. Cuyler

Member of the New York Provincial Congress
- In office 1775–1776

Personal details
- Born: September 1, 1741 Albany, Province of New York, British America
- Died: June 5, 1804 (aged 62)
- Spouse: Lydia Van Vechten (m. 1764)
- Children: 7
- Parent(s): Johannes Cuyler Jr. Catharina Glen
- Relatives: Johannes Cuyler (grandfather)

Jacob J. Cuyler (September 1741 – June 5, 1804) was an American silversmith, active circa 1765-1790 in Albany, New York.

== Early life ==
Cuyler was born in September 1741. He was the son of Johannes Cuyler Jr. (1699–1746) and Catharina (née Glen) Cuyler (b. 1699).

His paternal grandparents were Albany mayor Johannes Cuyler (1661–1740) and Elsje Ten Broeck (d. 1752), herself the daughter of Albany mayor Dirck Wesselse Ten Broeck (1638–1717). His mother was the daughter of Johannes Jacob Glen.

== Career ==
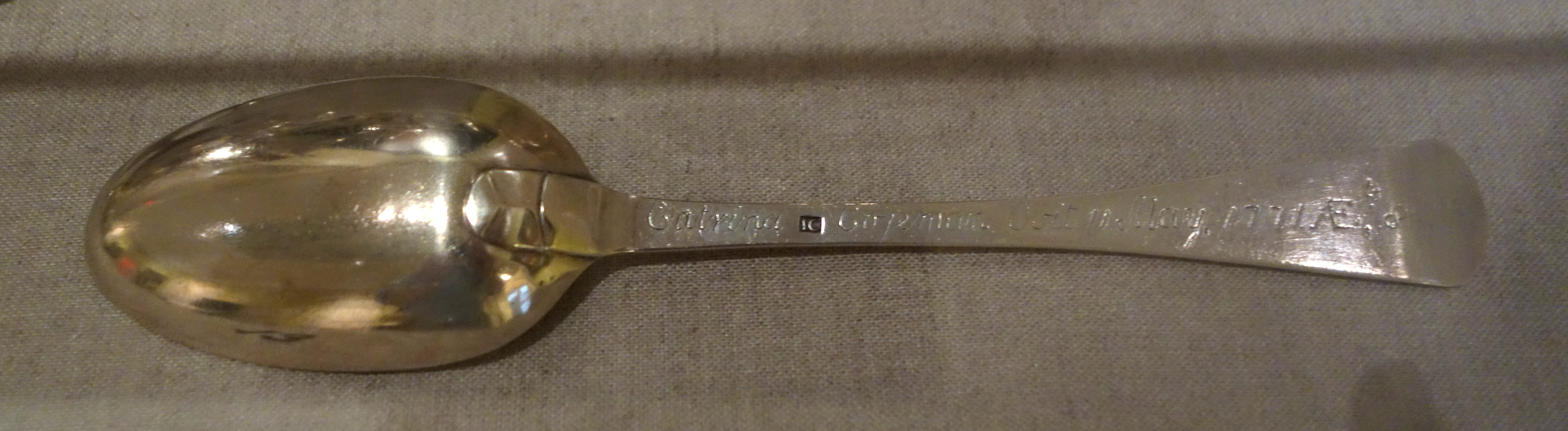
Funeral spoon, attributed to Jacob Cuyler, Albany, 1771

He was a silversmith by trade and was known for his high quality work. In Albany, he served as firemaster and was manager of the lottery during the early 1770s. In 1767, he willed the estate of his uncle, Johannes Glen (1704-1770).

In 1766, he signed the constitution of Albany. Cuyler was also a member of the Sons of Liberty, and in 1767 served as the first lieutenant in the Albany militia company. During the Revolutionary War period, he was a member of the Albany Committee of Correspondence, and served as a delegate from Albany to the New York Provincial Congress in 1776, and later in the Continental Commissary General's office.

== Personal life ==
On March 5, 1764, Cuyler married Lydia Van Vechten (1743–1808), the daughter of Dirck and Elizabeth (née Ten Broeck) Van Vechten, in Albany. By 1780, they had seven children.

Cuyler died on June 5, 1804.
