= Gerrit Y. Lansing =

American politician (1783–1862)

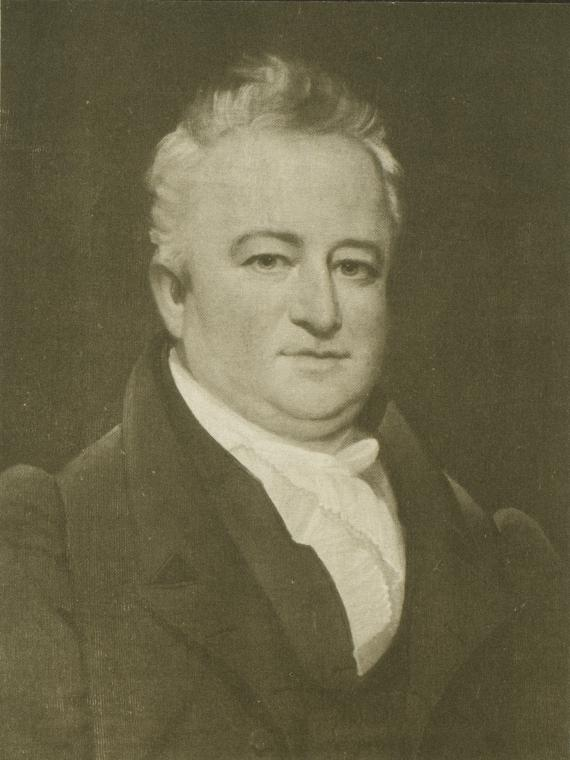

Chancellor of the University of the State of New York
- In office 1849–1862
- Preceded by: Peter Wendell
- Succeeded by: John V. L. Pruyn

Member of the U.S. House of Representatives from New York's 10th district
- In office March 4, 1831 – March 3, 1837
- Preceded by: Ambrose Spencer
- Succeeded by: Albert Gallup

Personal details
- Born: Gerrit Yates Lansing; August 4, 1783 Albany, Province of New York
- Died: January 3, 1862 (aged 78) Albany, New York
- Resting place: Albany Rural Cemetery
- Party: Jacksonian
- Spouse: Helen Ten Eyck (m. 1808; died 1838)
- Children: 4
- Parent(s): Abraham G. Lansing; Susanna Yates
- Relatives: John Lansing Jr. (uncle); Abraham Yates (grandfather)
- Education: Union College

Gerrit Yates Lansing (August 4, 1783 – January 3, 1862) was an American lawyer and politician who served three terms as a U.S. representative from New York from 1831 to 1837.

== Early life ==
Lansing was born in Albany, New York, on August 4, 1783. He was third of sixteen children born to Susanna Yates and Abraham G. Lansing, the New York State Treasurer. His younger sister, Susan Yates Lansing, became the second wife of Peter Gansevoort, son of Gen. Peter Gansevoort, in 1843.

He was the nephew of John Lansing Jr. His maternal grandfather was Abraham Yates.

Lansing pursued classical studies and was graduated from Union College in 1800. He studied law, was admitted to the bar in 1804 and commenced practice in Albany.

== Career ==
Lansing worked as the private secretary to Governor Morgan Lewis, the third Governor of New York.

He served as Clerk of the New York State Assembly in 1807. He served as judge of the Albany County probate court from 1816 to 1823.

Lansing was elected a regent of the University of the State of New York in 1829 and served until his death. He was appointed chancellor of the board on October 31, 1842, and served until his death.

=== Congress ===
He was elected as a Jacksonian to the Twenty-second, Twenty-third, and Twenty-fourth Congresses (March 4, 1831 – March 3, 1837). He was not a candidate for reelection in 1836, and returned to practicing law.

=== Later career ===
Lansing served as president of the Albany Savings Bank from 1854 until his death, and president of the Albany Insurance Company from 1859 until his death.

== Personal life ==
In March 1808, Lansing married Helen Ten Eyck (1787–1838), the daughter of Abraham Ten Eyck (1744–1824) and Annatje (née Lansing) Ten Eyck (1746–1823). Their children included:

- Charles Bridgen Lansing (1809–1890), who married Catherine Clinton Townsend, daughter of Albany Mayor John Townsend and Abby (née Spencer) Townsend (daughter of Ambrose Spencer). After her death, he married her sister, Abby Townsend.
- Jane Ann Lansing (1811–1886), who married Robert Hewson Pruyn (1815–1882), the U.S. Minister to Japan, in 1841.
- Susan Yates Lansing (1816–1911), who died unmarried.
- Abraham Gerrit Lansing (d. 1824), who died unmarried.

== Death and burial ==
Lansing died in Albany on January 3, 1862. He was interred at Albany Rural Cemetery.

== Sources ==
- United States Congress. "Gerrit Y. Lansing (id: L000086)". Biographical Directory of the United States Congress.

U.S. House of Representatives
| Preceded by Ambrose Spencer | Member of the U.S. House of Representatives from New York's 10th congressional district 1831–1837 | Succeeded by Albert Gallup |
Academic offices
| Preceded by Peter Wendell | Chancellor of the University of the State of New York; 1849-1862 | Succeeded by John V. L. Pruyn |
