= Robert Yates (politician) =

American Founding Father, politician, and judge

Chief Justice of the New York Supreme Court
- In office 1790–1798
- Preceded by: Richard Morris

Personal details
- Born: January 27, 1738 Schenectady, Province of New York, British America
- Died: September 9, 1801 (aged 63) Albany, New York, U.S.
- Party: Anti-Federalist
- Spouse: Sarah Ludlow (m. 1759; died 1791)
- Relations: Abraham Yates Jr. (uncle); Peter Waldron Yates (cousin)
- Children: 6, including John
- Parent(s): Joseph Yates; Maria Dunbar Yates

Robert Yates (January 27, 1738 – September 9, 1801) was an American politician, attorney, jurist, and surveyor. As a delegate representing New York at the Constitutional Convention in 1787, Yates is considered a Founding Father of the United States. Best known as a leader of the Anti-Federalist movement, he was the presumed author of political essays published in 1787-1788 under the pseudonyms "Brutus" and "Sydney". The essays opposed the Constitution based on the scope of the national government and the diminished sovereignty of the states. Yates also served as chief justice of the New York Supreme Court from 1790 to 1798.

== Early life ==
Robert Yates was born January 27, 1738, in Schenectady, New York, the oldest of twelve children of merchant Joseph Yates and Maria (née Dunbar) Yates. Among his large family was uncle Abraham Yates Jr., who served as mayor of Albany in the 1790s and cousin Peter Waldron Yates, who was a Continental Congressman and New York State Assemblyman. His paternal grandparents were Christoffel Yates, a prosperous farmer and blacksmith, and (née Winne) Yates.

He learned the craft of the surveyor and then decided to pursue a career in law. After clerking for William Livingston in New York City, in 1760 he was licensed to practice on his own.

== Career ==
Surveying supplemented Yates' attorney's income as he made a number of important land maps during the 1760s. He drew the first civilian map of Albany in 1770. He also relied on patronage from the Albany Corporation through his uncle, alderman Abraham Yates Jr. In 1771, he was elected to the Common Council as an alderman for the second ward. In those years he served on a number of committees, provided legal advice, and stepped forward to compile and issue the first published version of the "Laws and Ordinances of the City of Albany" in 1773.

=== Revolutionary War ===
From the beginning of the struggle for American independence, although he did not sign the Albany Sons of Liberty constitution of 1766, he was prominent in the local resistance to the Stamp Act. By 1774, he had joined the Albany Committee of Correspondence and stood among its first members when the committee's activities became public in 1775. At that time, he was still a member of the Albany common council – although its activities were being replaced by the extra-legal Committee of Correspondence, Safety and Protection. He represented the second ward on the committee and was in close contact with it from his subsequent offices until it ceased operations in 1778. At the same time, he also served as secretary of the Board of Indian Commissioners – a post that required him to travel to the frontier.

Beginning in the spring of 1775, Yates was elected to represent Albany in each of the four New York Provincial Congresses. The first three met in New York, while the last one, convened after the Declaration of Independence, met under duress in locations throughout the Hudson Valley. In 1776–77, he served on the committee that drafted the first New York State Constitution and also was a member of the "Secret Committee for Obstructing Navigation of the Hudson."

On May 8, 1777, Yates was appointed to the New York Supreme Court.

=== Later years ===
After the war ended, although principally an associate justice of the state Supreme Court, Yates maintained a modest legal practice and continued surveying as well. During the 1780s, his political star continued to rise in the "party" of Governor George Clinton as he spoke in opposition to the expansion of the scope of a national government. In 1787, he was appointed with John Lansing Jr. and Alexander Hamilton to represent New York at the Philadelphia Convention to revise the Articles of Confederation. Arriving in Philadelphia in May 1787, Yates and Lansing felt the mood of the convention to produce an entirely new form of government was beyond their authority. For this reason, Yates and Lansing departed the Convention in July 1787. In 2021, researchers discovered that Robert Yates attempted to return to the Convention, but arrived too late. En route from Albany to Philadelphia in September, Yates learned that the Convention had "risen." It is likely that Yates attempted to return to Philadelphia to counteract Alexander Hamilton. In December 1787, Yates and John Lansing wrote a letter to Governor Clinton urging opposition to the new Constitution. Yates's personal notes from the Philadelphia convention were published in 1821. Alexander Hamilton was the sole delegate from New York to sign the Constitution.

In 1788, Yates was elected as an anti-federalist delegate to the New York State ratifying convention at Poughkeepsie, and worked against adoption of the Constitution. Among the leading anti-federalists who attended the Poughkeepsie Convention, he was the most vocal delegate in support of protecting individual liberties. After the Poughkeepsie Convention ratified the Constitution with an accompanying request for amendments to protect individual liberties, Yates pledged his support as a matter of patriotic duty.

In 1789, he ran for governor against George Clinton with the support of the Anti-Federalists, who viewed him as a reasonable, potentially kindred spirit who was not from a wealthy family. He was defeated by Governor Clinton. Approached by the Federalists again in 1792, Yates refused to run citing the financial drain caused by past politicking. In the gubernatorial campaign of 1795, considerable sentiment existed for Yates's candidacy as he was firmly established in the center of the former Anti-Federal party. John Jay defeated him in a close election, effectively ending Yates's political career. By then, he already had devoted himself to the law.

In September 1790, Yates was chosen Chief Justice of the New York State Supreme Court. He served until the mandatory retirement age of sixty in 1798. Unlike many "new men of the Revolution," he did not attain great wealth and retired to his middling Albany home.

== Personal life ==
In 1765, he married Jannatte "Jane" Van Ness (1741–1818) and settled in Albany, New York. Jane was a sister of Judge Peter Van Ness of Kinderhook. Among her extended family was nephews John Peter Van Ness, William P. Van Ness, and Cornelius P. Van Ness. The couple had six children, including:

- John Van Ness Yates (1779–1839), who served as the Secretary of State of New York from 1818 to 1826.

He died in Albany, New York, on September 9, 1801, at age 63. He was originally buried at St. Peter's Cemetery, and later reinterred at Albany Rural Cemetery.

== Notes ==
Party political offices
Preceded by George Clinton	Democratic-Republican nominee for Governor of New York; 1795	Succeeded by Robert R. Livingston
