= New York Provincial Congress =

Revolutionary provisional government of New York State

Type
- Type: Unicameral Provisional Revolutionary Government of Province of New York

History
- Founded: May 22, 1775
- Disbanded: April 20, 1777
- Preceded by: New York General Assembly; Committee of Sixty
- Succeeded by: New York State Legislature

Leadership
- President: Peter Van Brugh Livingston (first)
- Leonard Gansevoort (final)
- Chairmen of the Committee of Safety: Nathaniel Woodhull (first); Leonard Gansevoort (final)
- President of the Council of Safety: Pierre Van Cortlandt (1777)

Meeting place
- 1st and 2nd Congress: New York City; 3rd Congress: White Plains; 4th Congress: Fishkill

The New York Provincial Congress (1775–1777) was a revolutionary provisional government formed by colonists during the American Revolution, as an alternative to the more conservative non-revolutionary New York General Assembly, and as a replacement for the largely ad hoc Committee of One Hundred. The Fourth Provincial Congress, resolving itself as the Convention of Representatives of the State of New York, adopted the first Constitution of the State of New York on April 20, 1777.

== Background ==
=== Committees of correspondence ===
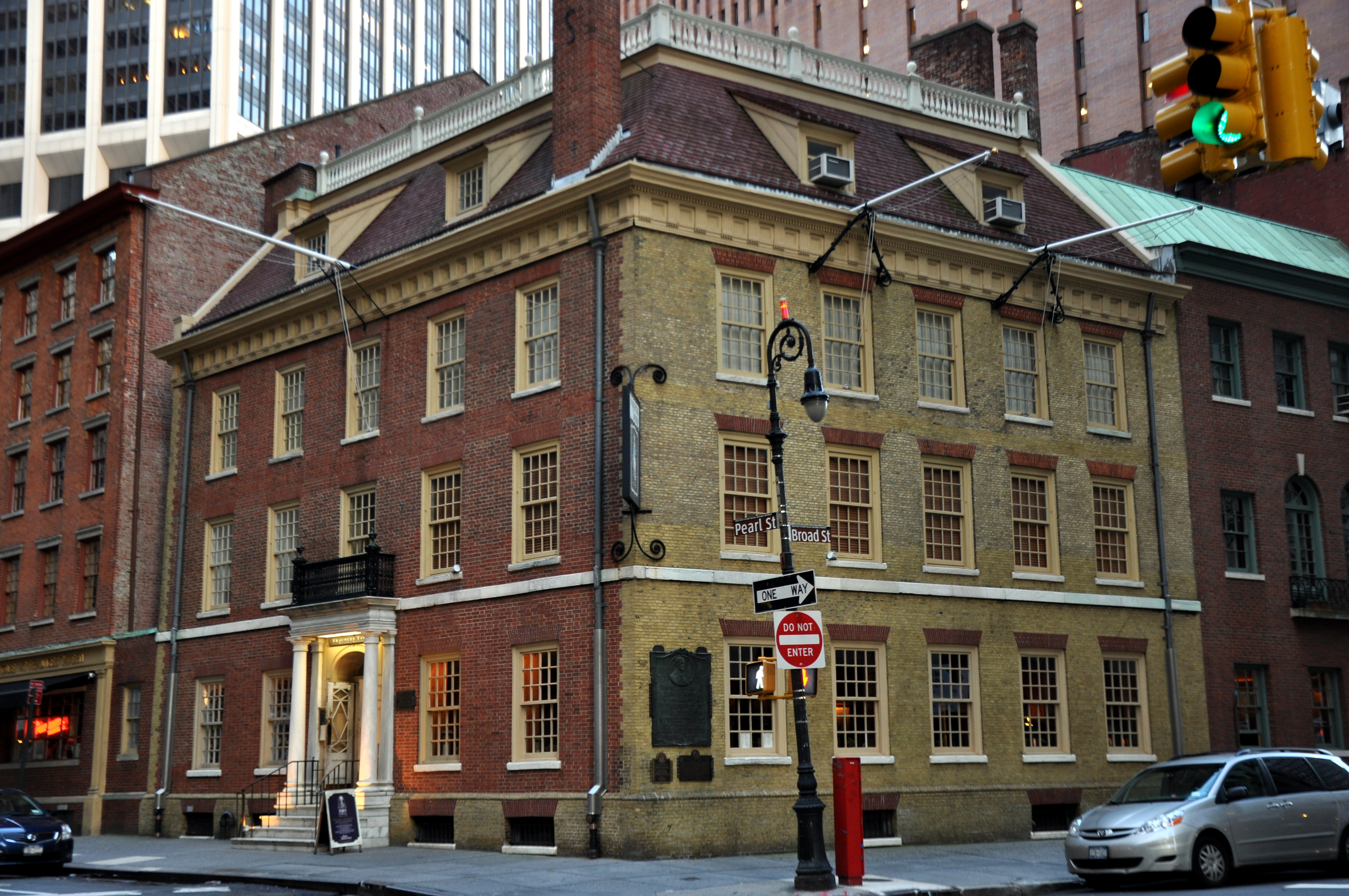
Fraunces Tavern in Lower Manhattan, meeting place of the Committee of Fifty-one, which resolved on July 4, 1774 to send delegates to the First Continental Congress in Philadelphia.

The Committee of Fifty-one was a committee of correspondence in the City and County of New York that first met on May 16, 1774. On May 30, the Committee formed a subcommittee to write a letter to the supervisors of the counties of New York to exhort them to also form similar committees of correspondence, which letter was adopted on a meeting of the Committee on May 31. In response to the letters from Boston, on July 4, 1774 resolutions were approved to appoint five delegates, Isaac Low, John Alsop, James Duane, Philip Livingston, and John Jay, to the "Congress of Deputies from the Colonies" (the First Continental Congress), and request that the other counties also send delegates. Three counties (Westchester, Duchess, and Albany) acquiesced to the five delegates, while three counties (Kings, Suffolk, and Orange) sent delegates of their own. The First Continental Congress met from September 5 to October 26, 1774.

=== New York General Assembly ===
George Rex Flag, a protest flag flown in New York at the time of the revolution

In January and February 1775, the New York General Assembly voted down successive resolutions approving the proceedings of the First Continental Congress and refused to send delegates to the Second Continental Congress. New York was the only colonial assembly which did not approve the proceedings of the First Continental Congress. Opposition to the Congress revolved around the opinion that the provincial houses of assembly were the proper agencies to solicit redress for grievances. In March, the Assembly broke with the rest of the colonies and sent its own petition to Parliament, which rejected the petition because it contained claims about a lack of authority of the "parent state" to tax colonists, "which made it impossible" to accept. The Assembly last met on April 3, 1775.

=== Provincial Convention ===
On March 15, 1775, the Committee of Sixty had issued a call to the counties of New York to send delegates to a Provincial Convention. A Provincial Convention assembled weeks later in New York City on April 20, 1775, where delegates were elected to the Second Continental Congress.

Philip Livingston was its chairman. It included the delegates to the first Continental Congress and also five new members. All counties other than Tryon, Gloucester, and Cumberland were represented. The scope of the Provincial Convention did not extend beyond electing delegates, and they dispersed on April 22. On April 23, news of the Battles of Lexington and Concord, the first battle of the American Revolutionary War, reached the Congress.

== First Provincial Congress ==
The First Provincial Congress was convened in New York City on May 22, 1775 with Peter Van Brugh Livingston as president. The first resolution adopted was obedience to recommendations made by the Second Continental Congress.

The Provincial Congress adapted a "Plan of Accommodation between Great Britain and America", which it sent to its delegates to the Continental Congress, urging extreme caution in opposing Britain. The plan demanded the British government repeal all unpopular laws affecting the colonies and acknowledge the right of the colonies to self-taxation. In return, New York promised to contribute to the costs of defense, maintain civil government, and recognize Britain's right to regulate imperial trade.

In May, they ordered the militia to stockpile arms, remove cannon from Fort Crown Point and Fort Ticonderoga, and erect fortifications and defenses on Manhattan Island. All Loyalists in the province were disarmed. In May, the raising of 3,000 militia to serve until December 31 was authorized, and in early June they authorized the payment of £5 sterling for each hundredweight of gunpowder delivered to county military stockpiles.

The Provincial Congress condemned the planned invasion of Canada, since they concluded it conflicted with their own plan of reconciliation. In June, in response to rising tensions, British troops in New York City left to board ships in the harbor. Marinus Willett intervened to prevent them taking carts loaded with militia arms back to the ships. The Provincial Congress welcomed the return of Governor William Tryon, regarded as someone who could be reasoned with, while on the same day providing a more elaborate welcome for Continental Army Commander-in-Chief General George Washington, on his way to take command at the Siege of Boston. On June 28, 1775 they authorized the raising of the four regiments of the New York Line. On July 20, 1775, members of the Sons of Liberty and others raided a British storehouse at Turtle Bay. In August, the Congress ordered the militia to remove the cannon at the Battery, which was done under fire from the ship of the line HMS Asia. In late 1775, the provincial militia was restructured.

It adjourned on November 4, 1775 and appointed a Committee of Safety to sit during its recess. This committee was dominated by Alexander McDougall and John Morin Scott.

Members:

Named individual	Representing	Details
Isaac Low	City & County of New York	
Peter Van Brugh Livingston	City & County of New York	President
Alexander McDougall	City & County of New York	
Leonard Lispenard	City & County of New York	
Joseph Hallett	City & County of New York	
Abraham Walton	City & County of New York	
Abraham Brasier	City & County of New York	
Isaac Roosevelt	City & County of New York	
John De Lancey	City & County of New York	
James Beekman	City & County of New York	
Samuel Verplanck	City & County of New York	
Richard Yates	City & County of New York	
David Clarkson	City & County of New York	
Thomas Smith	City & County of New York	
Benjamin Kissam	City & County of New York	
John Morin Scott	City & County of New York	
John Van Cortlandt	City & County of New York	
Jacobus Van Zandt	City & County of New York	
John Marston	City & County of New York	
George Folliot	City & County of New York	
Walter Franklin	City & County of New York	
Robert Yates	City & County of Albany	
Abraham Yates Jr.	City & County of Albany	
Volkert P. Douw	City & County of Albany	Vice-President
Jacob Cuyler	City & County of Albany	
Peter Silvester	City & County of Albany	
Dirck Swart	City & County of Albany	
Walter Livingston	City & County of Albany	
Robert Van Rensselaer	City & County of Albany	
Henry Glen	City & County of Albany	
Abraham Ten Broeck	City & County of Albany	
Francis Nicoll	City & County of Albany	
Dirck Brinckerhoff	Dutchess County	Chairman
Anthony Hoffman	Dutchess County	
Zephaniah Platt	Dutchess County	
Richard Montgomery	Dutchess County	
Ephraim Paine	Dutchess County	
Gilbert Livingston	Dutchess County	
Jonathan Landon	Dutchess County	
Gysbert Schenck	Dutchess County	
Melancton Smith	Dutchess County	
Nathaniel Sackett	Dutchess County	
Johannes Hardenbergh	Ulster County	
James Clinton	Ulster County	
Christopher Tappan	Ulster County	
John Nicholson	Ulster County	
Jacob Hoornbeck	Ulster County	
John Coe	Orange County	
David Pye	Orange County	
Michael Jackson	Goshen County	
Benjamin Tusten	Goshen County	
Peter Clowes	Goshen County	
William Allison	Goshen County	
Nathaniel Woodhull	Suffolk County	
John Sloss Hobart	Suffolk County	
Thomas Tredwell	Suffolk County	
John Foster	Suffolk County	
Ezra L'Hommedieu	Suffolk County	
Thomas Wickham	Suffolk County	
James Havens	Suffolk County	
Selah Strong	Suffolk County	
Gouverneur Morris	Westchester County	
Lewis Graham	Westchester County	
James Van Cortlandt	Westchester County	
Stephen Ward	Westchester County	
Joseph Drake	Westchester County	
Philip Van Cortlandt	Westchester County	
James Holmes	Westchester County	
David Dayton	Westchester County	
John Thomas, Jr.	Westchester County	
Robert Graham	Westchester County	
William Paulding	Westchester County	
Henry Williams	Kings County	
Jeremiah Remsen	Kings County	
Paul Michean	Richmond County	
John Journey	Richmond County	
Aaron Cortelyou	Richmond County	
Richard Conner	Richmond County	
Richard Lawrence	Richmond County	

== Second Provincial Congress ==
The Second Provincial Congress was organized on December 6, 1775 and sat in New York City, and continued until adjournment on May 13, 1776. In January, 1776, George Washington ordered Major General Charles Lee to prepare New York City for the coming British attack. In February, the Provincial Congress initially refused Lee's entry as antagonistic to the British ships with their guns aimed at the city, but then agreed and also decided to stop provisioning the British ships in New York Harbor.

== Third Provincial Congress ==
The Third Provincial Congress was organized on May 22, 1776. It continued in session until June 30, 1776. It took place in Fishkill. It instructed its delegates to the 2nd Continental Congress to oppose independence. On May 31, 1776, the Continental Congress recommended that each of the provinces establish themselves as states. In June, British invasion forces began to amass in New York Harbor.

Notable members (partial list):

- Robert Yates
- Jacob Cuyler
- Peter Silvester
- Dirck Swart
- Henry Glen
- Francis Nicoll
- Robert Van Rensselaer
- Abraham Yates Jr.
- Philip Schuyler
- Abraham Ten Broeck
- Walter Livingston

== Fourth Provincial Congress (Convention of Representatives of the State of New York) ==
The Fourth Provincial Congress convened in White Plains on July 9, 1776 and became known as the First Constitutional Convention. It declared the independent state of New York on July 9, 1776. On the same day the Declaration of Independence was read by order of George Washington to the Continental Army and local citizens on the commons of New York City, who celebrated by tearing down the statue of George III in nearby Bowling Green. On July 10, 1776, the Fourth Provincial Congress changed its name to the Convention of Representatives of the State of New York, and "acts as legislature without an executive." On August 1, the convention assigned the task of drafting a constitution to a committee of thirteen and ordered it to report a draft by August 27, but it did not do so until March 12, 1777. While adjourned it left a Committee of Safety in charge.

The Constitution of the State of New York was adopted on April 20, 1777 in Kingston. The governor would be elected and not appointed, voting qualifications were reduced, secret ballots were introduced, and civil rights were guaranteed. On July 9, 1778 the State of New York signed the Articles of Confederation and officially became part of the government of the United States of America, though it had been a part of the nation as representative were signatories to the Declaration in 1776.

== List of presidents and chairmen ==
1st Provincial Congress

- Peter Van Brugh Livingston May 23, 1775
- Nathaniel Woodhull Aug 23, 1775 pro tem
- Abraham Yates Nov 2, 1775 pro tem

2nd Provincial Congress

- Nathaniel Woodhull Dec 6, 1775
- John Haring Dec 16, 1775 pro tem
- Nathaniel Woodhull Feb 12, 1776 pro tem

3rd Provincial Congress

- Nathaniel Woodhull May 18, 1776
- John Haring Jun 19, 1776

4th Provincial Congress and Representative Convention

- Nathaniel Woodhull Jul 9, 1776
- Abraham Yates Aug 10, 1776 pro tem
- Abraham Yates Aug 28, 1776
- Peter Van Brugh Livingston Sep 26, 1776
- Abraham Ten Broeck Mar 6, 1777
- Leonard Gansevoort Apr 18, 1777

=== Chairmen of the Committee of Safety ===
- Nathaniel Woodhull July 10, 1776 to August 10, 1776
- Abraham Yates August 10, 1776 to September 26, 1776
- Peter Van Brugh Livingston September 26, 1776 to March 6, 1777
- Abraham Ten Broeck March 6, 1777 to April 9, 1777
- William Smith April 9, 1777 to April 11, 1777
- Pierre Van Cortlandt April 11, 1777 to April 18, 1777
- Leonard Gansevoort April 18, 1777 to May 14, 1777

=== President of the Council of Safety ===
- Pierre Van Cortlandt May 14, 1777 to July 30, 1777

== See also ==
- Provincial Congress
- Category:Members of the New York Provincial Congress
- New York Declaration of Independence
