= John Lansing Jr. =

American Founding Father and politician

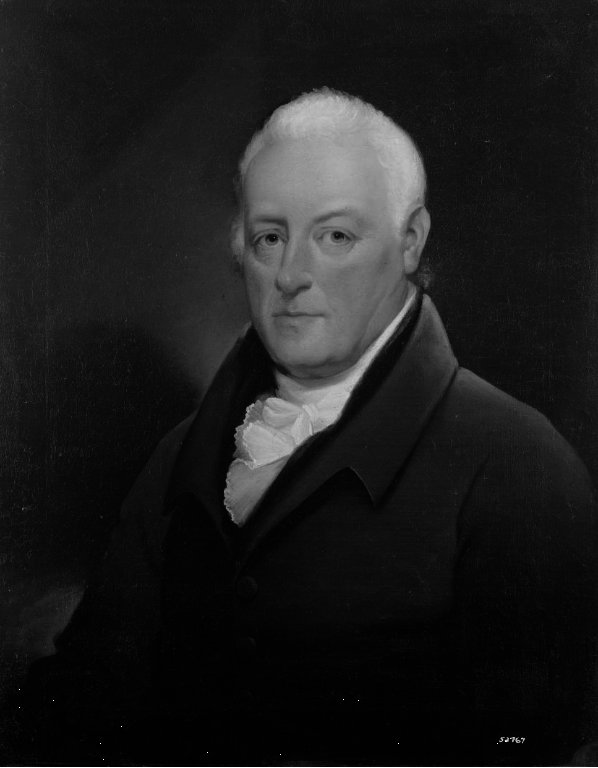

Chancellor of New York
- In office 1801–1814
- Preceded by: Robert R. Livingston
- Succeeded by: James Kent

Mayor of Albany, New York
- In office 1786–1790
- Preceded by: Johannes Jacobse Beekman
- Succeeded by: Abraham Yates Jr.

Personal details
- Born: John Ten Eyck Lansing Jr. January 30, 1754 Albany, New York, British America
- Died: December 12, 1829 (disappeared) (aged 75) New York City, New York, U.S.
- Spouse: Cornelia Ray (m. 1781; his disappearance 1829)
- Parent(s): Gerrit Jacob Lansing; Jannetje Waters
- Relatives: Abraham Lansing (brother); Gerrit Lansing (nephew); Robert Lansing (nephew)

John Ten Eyck Lansing Jr. (January 30, 1754 – vanished December 12, 1829), a Founding Father of the United States, was an attorney, jurist, and politician.

Born and raised in Albany, New York, Lansing was trained as a lawyer, and was long involved in politics and government. During the American Revolution he was military secretary to General Philip Schuyler. Lansing served in the New York State Assembly from 1781 to 1784, in 1786, and in 1789; served as Speaker of the Assembly in 1786 and 1789; served as a member of the Congress of the Confederation in 1785; and served as mayor of Albany from 1786 to 1790. He was a delegate to the federal Constitutional Convention in 1787, but withdrew from the body in July because he opposed the proposed United States Constitution as infringing on state and individual rights. He was a delegate to the New York ratification convention in June 1788, but was unable to prevent the Constitution from being approved.

In 1790, Lansing was a member of the commission that settled the New York-Vermont boundary as part of Vermont's admission to the Union as the fourteenth state in 1791. He was a justice of the New York Supreme Court from 1790 to 1798, and chief justice from 1798 to 1801. He was also Chancellor of New York from 1801 to 1814, and in 1817 was a special commissioner to resolve New York City and New York County claims to land in Vermont. From 1817 until his death, he was regent of the University of the State of New York. Lansing disappeared in December 1829, after leaving his New York City hotel room to mail a letter. No trace was ever found, and what happened to Lansing remains unknown.

== Early life ==
John Ten Eyck Lansing Jr. was born on January 30, 1754, in Albany, New York. He was the son of Gerrit Jacob Lansing (b. 1711) and Jannetje "Jane" (née Waters) Lansing (1728–1810). His younger brother was Abraham Gerritse Lansing (1756–1834), New York State Treasurer who married Susanna Yates, the daughter of Abraham Yates. Another brother, Sanders G. Lansing (1766–1850), married Catherine Ten Eyck (1769–1850), daughter of Abraham Ten Eyck (1744–1824) and Annatje (née Lansing) Ten Eyck (1746–1823).

Through his brother Abraham, Lansing was the uncle of Gerrit Yates Lansing (1783–1862), a member of the U.S. House of Representatives, and Susan Yates Lansing (1804–1874), who was the second wife of Peter Gansevoort (1788–1876), son of Gen. Peter Gansevoort. Through his brother Sanders, he was the uncle of Robert Lansing (1799–1878), a New York State Senator and the grandfather of U.S. Secretary of State Robert Lansing.

== Career ==
Lansing studied law with Robert Yates in Albany, and was admitted to practice in 1775. From 1776 until 1777 during the Revolutionary War, Lansing served as a military secretary to General Philip Schuyler. Afterwards he was a member of the New York State Assembly from 1780 to 1784, in 1785–86, and 1788–89, being its Speaker during the latter two terms. He served New York as a member of the Confederation Congress in 1785.

In 1786, Lansing was appointed Mayor of Albany. He represented New York as one of three representatives at the Constitutional Convention in 1787, where he intended to follow the wishes of the New York Legislature and only amend the existing Articles of Confederation. However, as the convention progressed he became dismayed that the convention was, in his view, exceeding of its mandate by writing an entirely new constitution. Lansing's desire was to see the Articles strengthened by giving it a source of revenue, the power to regulate commerce, and to enforce treaties. He joined other prominent Anti-Federalists that strongly opposed Alexander Hamilton, James Wilson, and James Madison's notions of a strong centralized national government to replace the Articles.

Lansing, along with fellow New York delegate Yates, as well as Luther Martin of Maryland and George Mason of Virginia, strongly opposed the newly proposed United States Constitution because they thought it was fundamentally flawed and it infringed on the sovereignty of the independent States while not doing enough to guarantee individual liberty. Both Lansing and Yates walked out of the convention after six weeks and explained their departure in a joint letter to New York Governor George Clinton. Neither man signed the constitution. At the New York Ratifying Convention that followed, Lansing, along with Melancton Smith, took the lead in the debates as the leaders of the Anti-Federalist majority. Their attempts to prevent ratification ultimately failed by a narrow vote of 30 to 27.

Lansing was appointed a justice of the New York State Supreme Court in 1790, and on February 15, 1798, he was elevated to the post of chief justice. In 1801, he also became the second Chancellor of New York, succeeding Robert R. Livingston. In 1814 Lansing became a Regent of the University of the State of New York.

== Disappearance ==
On the evening of December 12, 1829, Lansing left his Manhattan hotel to mail a letter at a dock in New York City, never to be seen again. He was 75 years old and was presumed drowned or perhaps murdered. Lansing's fate was a major mystery in New York State at the time, rivaled only by the 1826 disappearance of William Morgan, the anti-Masonic writer.

Only one major clue to Lansing's disappearance appeared after his death. In 1882, the memoirs of Thurlow Weed, former Whig and Republican political leader in New York State, were published by Weed's grandson T. W. Barnes. Weed wrote that Lansing was murdered by several prominent political and social figures who found he was in the way of their projects. According to Weed, his unnamed source showed him papers to prove it, but begged Weed not to publish them until all the individuals had died. Weed said they were all dead by 1870, but he did not wish to harm their respected family reputations, so upon advice of two friends he decided not to reveal what he had been told.

== Personal life ==
On April 8, 1781, Lansing was married to Cornelia Ray (1757–1834), daughter of Richard Ray (often confused with Richard son's name and Cornelia's brother's name of Robert, even by some historians) and Sarah (née Bogart) Ray of New York City. Together, they were the parents of ten children, five of whom died young. Their children included:

- Jane Lansing (1785–1871), who married Rensselaer Westerlo (1776–1851) in 1805. He was the son of Eilardus Westerlo and Catherine Livingston, herself the daughter of Philip Livingston and the widow of Stephen Van Rensselaer II.
- Frances Lansing (1791–1855), who married Jacob Livingston Sutherland (1788–1845) in 1811.
- Cornelia Lansing (1795–1877)
- Sarah Ray Lansing (1797–1848), who married Edward Livingston (1796–1840) in 1819.

Lansing's widow died in January 1834 and is buried at Albany Rural Cemetery.

=== Legacy ===
The Town of Lansing, New York was named for John Lansing. Lansing Charter Township, Michigan, originally simply "Lansing Township", was named by early settlers who came from the Town of Lansing, New York. The name of the capital city of Michigan, "Lansing", is derived from the name of the same Lansing Charter Township, out of whose original territory it was created and which it has almost completely annexed to itself. Thus both the capital of Michigan and the township which it has nearly replaced originally were and remain named, albeit indirectly, for John Lansing.

== See also ==
- List of mayors of Albany, New York
- List of people who disappeared mysteriously (pre-1910)

== Sources ==
- United States Congress. "John Lansing Jr. (id: L000087)". Biographical Directory of the United States Congress.
- Several Bios
- Lansing Family Tree
- Bio at the NARA
- John Lansing Jr. biography
- Edmund Pearson Instigation of the Devil (New York, London: Charles Scribner's Sons, 1930), Chapter XXIII: A Rather Mysterious Chancellor, p. 277–287, 355.
- Pauline Maier, Ratification, The People Debate the Constitution 1787–1788, (New York, London, Toronto, Sydney:Simon & Schuster, 2010) p. 35, 47, 90–93, 325–326, 367, 375, 396, 398.

Political offices
Preceded by David Gelston	Speaker of the New York State Assembly; 1786	Succeeded by Richard Varick
Preceded by Richard Varick	Speaker of the New York State Assembly; 1788–1789	Succeeded by Gulian Verplanck
Legal offices
Preceded by Robert R. Livingston	Chancellor of New York; 1801–1814	Succeeded by James Kent
