= 1795 New York gubernatorial election =

- April 1795
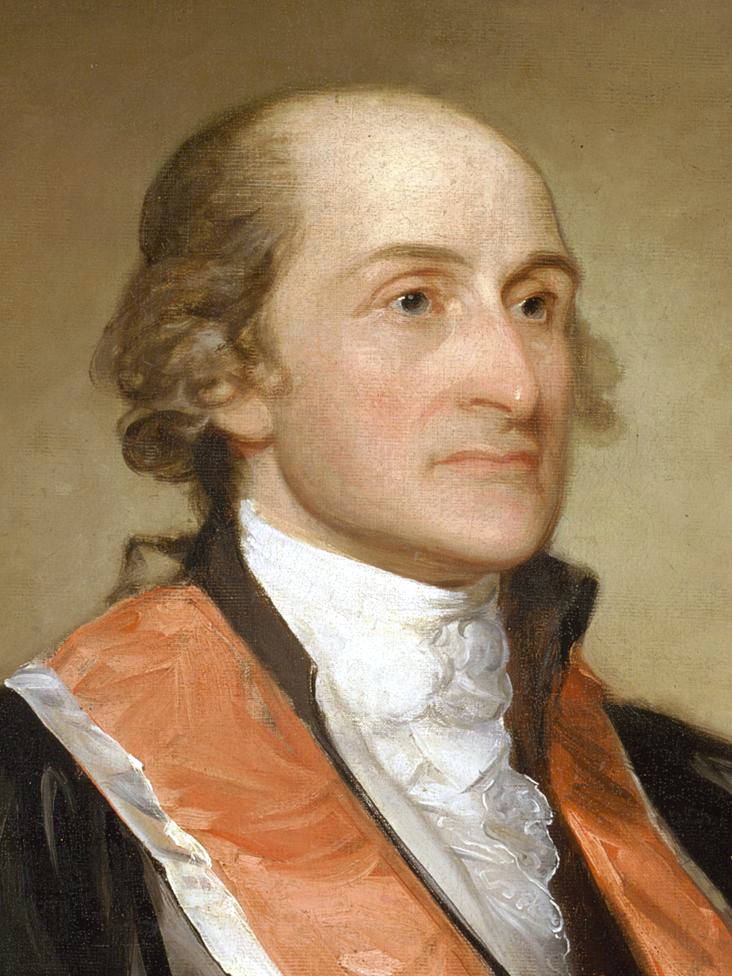

Nominee	John Jay	Robert Yates
Party	Federalist	Democratic-Republican
Popular vote	13,481	11,892
Percentage	53.79%	46.21%
- County results Jay: 50–60% 60–70% 70–80% 80–90% >90% Yates: 50–60% 60–70% 70–80%
Governor before election
George Clinton
Democratic-Republican
Elected Governor
John Jay
Federalist

The 1795 New York gubernatorial election was held in April 1795 to elect the Governor and Lieutenant Governor of New York. Incumbent Governor George Clinton, who had served continuously since independence in 1777, did not seek a seventh consecutive term in office. Chief Justice of the United States John Jay, who had narrowly lost to Clinton in the contested election of 1792, was elected over Chief Justice of New York Robert Yates.

== Background ==
After the 1792 election was decided by the canvassing committee's decision to disallow votes from Ostego County which would have given John Jay the majority over George Clinton, partisanship and opposition to Governor Clinton in New York escalated. Shortly after the 1792 race was resolved, Clinton also entered national politics by challenging John Adams for the vice presidency.

Federalists won a triumphant majority in the 1793 and 1794 legislative elections, and Federalist sentiment grew after the Genet affair. In late January 1795, shortly after the legislature re-elected Rufus King to the United States Senate, Clinton declined to run for re-election, suspending a thirty-year career in politics. Lieutenant Governor Pierre Van Cortlandt, who had served alongside Clinton since the American Revolution, also declined to run for re-election, citing his advanced age.

=== Qualifications ===
Under Article VII of the New York Constitution of 1777, only certain male freeholders and certain freemen of Albany or New York City could vote:

VII. That every male inhabitant of full age, who shall have personally resided within one of the counties of this State for six months immediately preceding the day of election, shall, at such election, be entitled to vote for representatives of the said county in assembly; if, during the time aforesaid, he shall have been a freeholder, possessing a freehold of the value of twenty pounds, within the said county, or have rented a tenement therein of the yearly value of forty shillings, and been rated and actually paid taxes to this State: Provided always, That every person who now is a freeman of the city of Albany, or who was made a freeman of the city of New York on or before the fourteenth day of October, in the year of our Lord one thousand seven hundred and seventy-five, and shall be actually and usually resident in the said cities, respectively, shall be entitled to vote for representatives in assembly within his said place of residence.

== Federalist caucus ==
=== Candidates ===
- John Jay, Chief Justice of the United States and former United States Secretary of State

=== Caucus ===
For the first time, the Federalists met in a nominating caucus. Jay was the favorite of the party, given his national prominence and sympathy from his 1792 defeat. Some Federalists did fear political backlash against the potentially unpopular peace treaty with Great Britain which Jay was negotiating at the time, but this treaty was not expected to be publicly known until after the election. Jay was nominated without his knowledge.

== Republican nomination ==
=== Candidates ===
- Robert Yates, Chief Justice of the New York Supreme Court and Federalist nominee in 1789

=== Nomination ===
Yates was nominated by the Republican party after considerable difficulty, despite the fact that he had challenged Clinton in 1789.

== General election ==
=== Candidates ===
- John Jay, Chief Justice of the United States and former United States Secretary of State (Federalist)
- Robert Yates, Chief Justice of the New York Supreme Court and Federalist nominee in 1789 (Republican)

==== Declined ====
- Aaron Burr, United States Senator

Aaron Burr was again suggested as a third-party candidate, but a majority in both factions were opposed to him.

=== Results ===
1795 New York gubernatorial election
Party	Candidate	Votes	%	±%
Federalist	John Jay	13,481	53.79%	▲4.11
Democratic-Republican	Robert Yates	11,892	46.21%	▼4.11
Total votes		25,373	100.00%	

== Aftermath ==
Jay was sworn into office on July 1, one day before news of his treaty with Great Britain became public in the United States. Public displays of violent opposition erupted, including a burning effigy of the new Governor in Philadelphia. Opposition was so strong that Federalists lost a congressional election in their stronghold of New York City.

== See also ==
- New York gubernatorial elections
- New York state elections
