= Gholson Kercheval =

American pioneer (1801–1835)

Member of the Illinois General Assembly
- In office 1838–1840

Cook County Commissioner
- In office March 1831 – ~1832
- Preceded by: office established

Sub-agent of Indian Affairs at Chicago
- In office 1831–1833
- Appointed by: United States Senate
- Agent: Thomas Jefferson Vance Owen

Personal details
- Born: December 4, 1805 Mason County, Kentucky
- Died: July 17, 1875 (aged 69) San Francisco, California
- Party: Democratic
- Spouse: Blanche Felicite Hotchkiss (m. 1833)
- Children: 2
- Parents: John Kercheval (father); Jane Berry (mother)
- Occupation: Pioneer, politician, negotiator

Kercheval Gholson (December 4, 1805 – July 17, 1875) was an American politician who was an early settler of Chicago, and served as an Indian agent and a member of the Illinois House of Representatives. In his later life, he moved to California.

== Early life ==
Gholson was born in Mason County, Kentucky on December 4, 1805. He was the youngest son of John Kercheval and Jane Kercheval (née Berry).

== Life and career in Chicago ==
Gholson was one of the earliest non-native settlers of Chicago, Illinois, arriving in approximately 1830. In March 1831, he was sworn in as one of the inaugural three Cook County Commissioners. From 1831 through 1833, he worked as a sub-agent of Indiana Affairs at Chicago, working as a deputy to his brother-in-law Thomas Jefferson Vance Owen (Chicago's Indian agent). While holding this role, he worked on behalf of the United States federal government as a mediator in its negotiations with the Sauk and Fox (Meskwaki) native nations, for which he was paid $2,000. While sub-agent, he signed the 1833 Treaty of Chicago as a witness. On August 10, 1833, Kercheval voted in the inaugural Chicago town election.

During the Black Hawk War, Gholson served as a captain of the Chicago company in the Illinois Militia. He organized the company to defend Chicago and the Rock River Valley during the war. George W. Dole served as first lieutenant in his company.

In August 1838 he was elected to serve as a Democratic Party member of the Illinois House of Representatives representing a constituency in Cook, McHenry, and Will Counties. He served until 1840.

== Later life in California ==
In 1850, Kerchaval and his family moved to the state of California. Kerchaval died there in the city of San Francisco on July 17, 1875.

== Personal life, family, descendants ==
On November 25, 1833, Kercheval wed Blanche Felicite Hotchkiss in Kaskaskia, Illinois. Together, they had two sons. Only one of their sons, Walter Gholson Kerchival, lived to adulthood. He married Clarissa Agnes Doud, and had a single child (daughter Blanche Felicitie Kerchival, who married Oma Carr and had two sons: Hugh R. Kerchival Carr and Lee Kercheval Carr).
