= Thomas Jefferson Vance Owen =

American pioneer (1801–1835)

1st President of the Board of Trustees of the Town of Chicago
- In office August 12, 1833 – August 11, 1834
- Preceded by: office established
- Succeeded by: John H. Kinzie

Chicago Town Trustee
- Preceded by: seat established

Indian Agent at Chicago
- Appointed by: United States Senate
- Deputy: Gholson Kercheval
- Preceded by: Alexander Wolcott Jr.

Cook County Commissioner of Schools
- Preceded by: office established

Member of the Illinois General Assembly

Personal details
- Born: April 5, 1801 Kentucky
- Died: October 15, 1835 (aged 34) Chicago, Illinois

Thomas Jefferson Vance Owen (April 5, 1801 – October 15, 1835) was an American settler. He served as the first president of the Board of Trustees of the Town of Chicago.

== Biography ==
Owen was born in Kentucky and migrated to Kaskaskia, Illinois, with his father in 1809. He had served several offices in Randolph County, Illinois, during the 1820s. He was elected to serve in the 7th Illinois General Assembly for Randolph County in August 1830 and took office on December 6 in the Illinois House of Representatives. He was of Welsh descent.

Alexander Wolcott Jr., the Indian agent at Chicago, died in October 1830. Owen was appointed to take his place by the United States Senate on February 4, 1831, being chosen over local residents Gurdon Saltonstall Hubbard and John H. Kinzie. Owen arrived in Chicago without having a house; the building intended to house the agent had become the property of Kinzie after Wolcott's death for having been included in James Thompson's plat of Chicago and Wolcott's subsequent inaction to stop it from falling into private hands. His deputy from 1831 to 1833 was Gholson Kercheval, who was also his brother-in-law. As Indian Commissioner, Owen was a supporter of the effort to relocate natives to areas west of the Mississippi.

In Chicago, Owen backed the establishment of Cook County, Illinois by the legislature, was a backer of the effort to establish schools, and was a promoter of railroad construction. Once Cook County was established in 1831, Owen served as its first school commissioner.

Under the leadership of Owen, a meeting was held where Chicago officially voted to incorporate as a town on August 5, 1833, with 12 votes for and one against, the lone dissenter living outside of Chicago. The Town of Chicago held the first election of its Board of Trustees on August 10. Those elected were Owen, George W. Dole, Madore B. Beaubien, John Miller, and E. S. Kimberly. The trustees first met on August 12, where Owen was selected as the president of the Board.

The federal government directed for there to be a treaty negotiated with the Potawatomi, Odawa, Chippewa and Kickapoo natives and the settlers. Owen organized the meeting. Ahead of the meeting, a large open arbor was built at the corner of Rush Street and Michigan Avenue to be used as a council house for the meeting. The meeting was held between September 10 and October 7, 1833. At the meeting, Owen was one of three individuals representing the United States in negotiating the 1833 Treaty of Chicago. The treaty saw the natives exchange their land in Illinois, the Wisconsin Territory, and the Michigan Territory for a sum of presents, certain annuities, payment of all claims against them, and a tract of equal size in Kansas along the Missouri River where they were required to move within three years.

Owen died on October 15, 1835, at his home in Chicago from a pulmonary illness that he had been suffering since May. His health at that time had been compromised during his efforts to expel Potawatomi Indians to lands west of the Mississippi River per the 1833 Treaty of Chicago. He was buried in Oakwood Cemetery in Springfield, Illinois.

Grand Avenue is so called due to a quote of Owen's referring to Chicago as "a grand place to live". Owen Avenue is named for Owen directly.

Historian James Ryan Haydon published a book on Owen in 1934 titled "Chicago's True Founder" which asserted that he was the true spiritual father of the city, as opposed to figures more popularly seen by modern audiences to have held that role such as John H. Kinzie and William B. Ogden. Haydon argued that Owen's contributions to Chicago were deliberately downplayed by later historians so as not to drown out the stories of Chicago's other pioneers, what he called the "Kinzie mythology".

== Bibliography ==
- Andreas, Alfred Theodore (1884–1886). History of Chicago. Vol. 1 (1975 ed.). New York, New York: Arno Press.
- Haydon, James Ryan (1934). Chicago's true founder, Thomas J. V. Owen: A pleading for truth and for social justice in Chicago history. Lombard, Illinois: Owen Memorial Fund.

Political offices
Preceded by Position established	President of the Town of Chicago; August 12, 1833 – 1834	Succeeded by John H. Kinzie
