= John F. Schermerhorn =

American Indian commissioner (1786–1851)

Rev. John F. Schermerhorn

One of three U.S. Commissioner of Indian Tribes in Arkansas and Oklahoma
- In office 1832–1836
- President: Andrew Jackson

Personal details
- Born: John Freeman Schermerhorn; September 24, 1786 Schenectady, New York, U.S.
- Died: March 15, 1851 (aged 64) Richmond, Virginia, U.S.
- Spouses: Catharine Yates (m. 1813; died 1835) Elizabeth Louisa Spottswood (m. 1837)
- Children: 11
- Parent(s): Barnard Freeman Schermerhorn; Ariaantje Van der Bogart
- Education: Union College
- Occupation: Minister

John Freeman Schermerhorn (September 24, 1786 – March 16, 1851) was an American minister and commissioner for Indian Affairs during the presidency of Andrew Jackson, a friend of his.

== Early life ==
John Freeman Schermerhorn was born on September 24, 1786, in Schenectady, New York. He was the son of Barnard Freeman Schermerhorn and Ariaantje Van der Bogart. In 1809, he graduated from Union College with a Bachelor of Arts degree.

== Career ==
Immediately after graduation he was sent out by the Society for the Propagation of the Gospel. His report to the Trustees of the Missionary Society of Connecticut was published in pamphlet form in Hartford in 1814, and was entitled: "A Correct View of that Part of the United States which lies West of the Allegheny Mountains, with regard to Religion & Morals"; by John F. Schermerhorn and Samuel J. Mills.

He entered the ministry of the Congregational Church, which he left in 1813 for the Dutch Reformed Church. He first settled at Middleburgh, Schoharie County, New York, where he was pastor of the Reformed Church there from 1816 to 1827. In 1816, he was Chaplain of the 9th Regiment New York Infantry.

In 1817, he visited upper Canada with Reverend Jacob Van Vechten and worked three months among the Dutch Churches there. In 1819, he was constituted a Life Member of the American Bible Society, by subscriptions raised by his congregation in Middleburgh. He preached his first Protestant sermon in New Orleans, where he went with a letter of introduction to Père Antoine, a priest of that city. He made most of the trip to New Orleans on horseback. As well as being a personal friend of President Andrew Jackson, he visited him on more than one occasion at "The Hermitage," Jackson's home, a few miles outside the city of Nashville, Tennessee.

In 1828, he was appointed Secretary of Domestic Missions by the Northern Board of the Missionary Society of the Reformed Church, which resulted in the organizations of Reformed Churches in Utica, Ithaca and Geneva, among others. Serious difficulties embarrassed his administration and though they were eventually amicably adjusted, he resigned the office in 1832. He never afterwards held a pastoral charge, but was frequently a leading member of the ecclesiastical assemblies, and continued to interest himself in the benevolent movements of the Church.

=== Indian Commissioner ===
In 1832, President Andrew Jackson appointed him one of a Commission to remove the Cherokee and Chickasaw Indians beyond the Mississippi River (later to be known as the Trail of Tears). Schermerhorn helped negotiate the Treaty of New Echota, proposing that in exchange for all Cherokee land east of the Mississippi River, the Cherokees would receive $5,000,000 from the U.S. (to be distributed per capita to all members of the tribe), an additional $500,000 for educational funds, title in perpetuity to land in Indian Territory equal to that given up, and full compensation for all property left behind. The treaty included a clause to allow all Cherokees who so desired to remain and become citizens of the states in which they resided, on individual allotments of 160 acres (0.65 km^{2}) of land. With that clause, it was unanimously approved by the contingent at New Echota, then signed by the negotiating committee of twenty, But that clause was struck out by President Jackson. The treaty was concluded at New Echota, Georgia, on 29 December 1835 and signed on 1 March 1836.

While Indian Commissioner, he acquired large tracts of land in Highland, Grayson, Bath and Wythe Counties, Virginia, in all about 400,000 acres (1,600 km^{2}). After long litigation the disposition of this property finally resulted in favor of his heirs. John F. Schermerhorn moved to Carroll County, Indiana, in 1840.

== Personal life ==
He married twice, first on August 6, 1813, to Catharine Yates (1788–1835), the daughter of Revolutionary Col. Christopher Peter Yates (1750–1815), who served on the Vigilance Committee and was a member of the First Provincial Congress who raised a company of rangers and was with Montgomery in Canada. Col. Yates was the nephew of Abraham Yates Jr. (1724–1796), the New York State lawyer and politician, and cousin of Robert Yates (1738–1801). With his first wife, he had eight children:

- Christopher Schermerhorn (b. 1814)
- Harriet Adriana Schermerhorn (1815–1886)
- Mary Yates Schermerhorn (b. 1817)
- Catherine Yates Schermerhorn (1819–1839)
- Bernard Schermerhorn (1821–1883), who married Josephine Case
- John Ingold Schermerhorn (1824–1876), who married Louisa Turner
- Sarah Ingold Schermerhorn (b. 1826)
- Susan Yates Schermerhorn (1828–1912), who married James Orr (1805–1876)

After the death of his first wife, he married again to Elizabeth "Eliza" Louisa (Hening) Spottswood of Virginia on April 6, 1837. Together, they had three children:

- William Waller Schermerhorn (b. 1838)
- Catherine Virginia Schermerhorn (b. 1841)
- Janette Egmont Schermerhorn (b. 1844).

Schermerhorn died on March 16, 1851, in Richmond, Virginia.

=== Descendants ===
Harriet, a daughter by his first wife, lived in Buffalo, New York, and after the death of her husband, Aurelian Conkling son of Alfred Conkling and brother of Roscoe and Frederick A. Conkling, went abroad and remained four years, most of the time in Paris, France. She travelled extensively through Spain, Germany, and Switzerland. During the Franco-Prussian War, she was in Paris, and was Directress of the Woman's Department of the American Ambulance Corps, organized by Dr. Evans, dentist to the Emperor. It was to his house that the Empress Eugenie fled when she left the Tuileries Palace. Mrs. Conkling assisted Dr. Evans in effecting the escape of the Empress, whom he took in his private carriage to the coast. She remained in Paris during the reign of the Commune and witnessed many blood-curdling scenes.
