= George W. Dole =

American pioneering businessman in Chicago

7th Postmaster of Chicago
- In office September 25, 1850 – March 1853
- President: Millard Fillmore
- Preceded by: Richard L. Wilson
- Succeeded by: Isaac Cook

Chicago Alderman from the 6th ward
- In office 1842–1844 Serving with George O. Bryan (1842–43); J. Marback (1843–44)
- Preceded by: George F. Foster/ James J.H. Howe
- Succeeded by: Michael Diversey/ Buckner Stith Morris
- In office 1838–1839 Serving with Grant Goodrich
- Preceded by: Samuel Jackson/ Bernard Ward
- Succeeded by: John H. Kinzie/ Buckner Stith Morris

Customs Inspector at Chicago
- In office 1840s

Chicago City Treasurer
- In office 1839–1840
- Preceded by: Hiram Pearson
- Succeeded by: N.H. Bolles

Treasurer of the Chicago Village Board of Trustees
- In office September 3, 1833 – 1834
- Preceded by: village newly-incorporated

Member of the Chicago Village Board of Trustees
- In office August 10, 1833 – 1834
- Preceded by: village newly-incorporated

Personal details
- Born: February 1800 Troy, New York
- Died: April 13, 1860 (age 60)
- Party: Whig; Free Soil; Republican
- Profession: Businessman

George W. Dole (February 1800 – April 13, 1860) was a businessman and early settler of Chicago. He has been dubbed Chicago's "father of the provisions, shipping and elevator business. Dole opened Chicago's first grocery store and started the city's meatpacking industry. He also ran a trading house that was a charter member of the Chicago Board of Trade. A member of the Whig and later Republican parties, Dole also served as the postmaster of Chicago, a member of the Chicago Common Council (city council), a member of the Chicago Board of Water Commissioners, a customs inspector at Chicago, and a town trustee of Chicago. He also ran as the Whig Party nominee for mayor of Chicago in the March 1844 Chicago mayoral election. During his first years in Chicago, Dole fought for the Illinois militia during the Black Hawk War. He involved himself in the free Kansas movement.

== Early life ==
George Washington Dole was born in Troy, New York. He was the son of James Dole, who had fought in the American Revolutionary War. Dole was raised in Troy. He attended school and he lived with his parents until he turned 18, at which time traveled out west.

After traveling by public conveyances to Auburn, New York, Dole went by foot to Buffalo, New York. With meager means but a strong work ethic, Dole worked his passage on a schooner to Detroit, Michigan. He then traveled to Pontiac, Michigan (at the time a frontier trading post where a brother of his resided). He found little work in Pontiac except for employment on a monthly basis at a farm nearby. He lived in Pontiac for several years. With the labor combined with the weather of Pontiac proving harmful to his health, he returned to Detroit where he began working for the general trader Oliver Newberry. Newberry soon trusted Dole enough to send him to run one of his outpost stores at a settlement further inland.

== Life and career in Chicago ==
Newberry, impressed with Dole, sent him to Chicago to run the Sutler's store at Fort Dearborn. Dole arrived at the settlement, as it was at the time—having a population of fewer than two hundred people—in 1831, the same year that Cook County, Illinois was established, settling at Wolf Point. He and fellow-Wolf Point resident, R. A. Kinzie, were the only two merchants in the city at this time. Dole has been described as Chicago's first merchant".

In Chicago, Dole was a member of the Episcopal Church of the United States, attending St James church.

During the Black Hawk War, Dole served in Gholson Kercheval's Chicago company of the Illinois militia. In 1853, he married Julia Brown.

=== Business ===
Dole opened the first grocery store in Chicago. It was located at Dearborn Street and Water Street. This area would later become the site of the city's wholesale market. Dole created the first slaughterhouse in Chicago, processing 150 head a day by 1833. That year Newberry would send beef and hides produced by Dole to eastern US markets, Chicago's first such shipment. From this beginning, Dole is credited with the establishment of the meat packing industry in Chicago, which would later grow into a long-term major industry for the city. Dole also, in partnership with John H. Kinzie, built the city's first steamboat.

Newberry would, in 1835, make Dole a partner of his trading house, which was renamed Newberry & Dole. After Newberry retired, Dole partnered with his nephews George F. Rumsey and Julian Sidney Rumsey to reform the house as Dole, Rumsey & Co. The company was one of the charter members of the Chicago Board of Trade. This partnership continued for six years until Dole retired from it on January 1, 1853. The house was then known as Rumsey Bros & Co., until it ceased operations in 1891.

Dole also engaged in the grain trade. In 1838, he and Newberry partnered to build the city's first grain storage facility, a gravity-pour grain elevator along Rush Street on the north bank of the Chicago River that loaded grain onto lake boats. The grain elevator's system was the first of several designed by engineer John Van Osdel. It used man-powered blocks and tackles to lift stacks of grain to its upper floor, where they were emptied into chutes into ship holds.

Late in his life, Dole and business rival George Armour joined forces in the grain trade, forming what became Armour, Dole & Co. The company would continue to expand in the years after Dole's death, being a leading player in the city's grain market.

=== Public offices and community roles ===
Rumsey was one of the incorporators of Chicago when it became a town on August 5, 1833. Five days later, Dole was elected to the town's inaugural board of Trustees along with Madore B. Beaubien, E. S. Kimberly, John Miller, and Thomas Jefferson Vance Owen. On September 3, 1833, Rumsey was appointed the board's inaugural treasurer. Dole also served on the Chicago Board of Water Commissioners. He was an elected trustee of the Chicago Orphan Asylum.

Dole was the director of the first state bank of Illinois and helped to organize the Chicago Board of Trade. In the 1840s, he served as Chicago's customs inspector. He served as the postmaster of Chicago in the early 1850s, after being appointed by President Millard Fillmore in September 1850.

=== In politics ===
Dole was a member of the Whig Party, and later the Republican Party. From 1838–1839 and again from 1842–1844, he was a member of the Chicago Common Council (as the city council was then-known), representing the 6th ward. From 1839 through 1840 he was the city treasurer of Chicago.

Dole was the unsuccessful Whig nominee in the March 1844 Chicago mayoral election, losing very narrowly. The election result was voided by the Chicago Common Council, which claimed that there had been electoral fraud by the Democratic Party. Dole did not run in the subsequent April do-over election, however. Dole was an early and active member of the free Kansas cause as part of the Free Soil movement, and became the treasurer of a national committee for the cause. Millard Fillmore appointed Dole as postmaster of Chicago during his presidency.

== Later life and death ==
Near the end of his life, Dole lost the significant sum of $80,000 by investing in a real estate deal that a friend had assured him would be a guaranteed success for him, greatly diminishing his personal financial wealth.

He died at the age of 60 on April 13, 1860, at his home. His widow would live until 1865.
