= Jacob Hoornbeck Stone House =

Historic house in New York, United States

- U.S. National Register of Historic Places
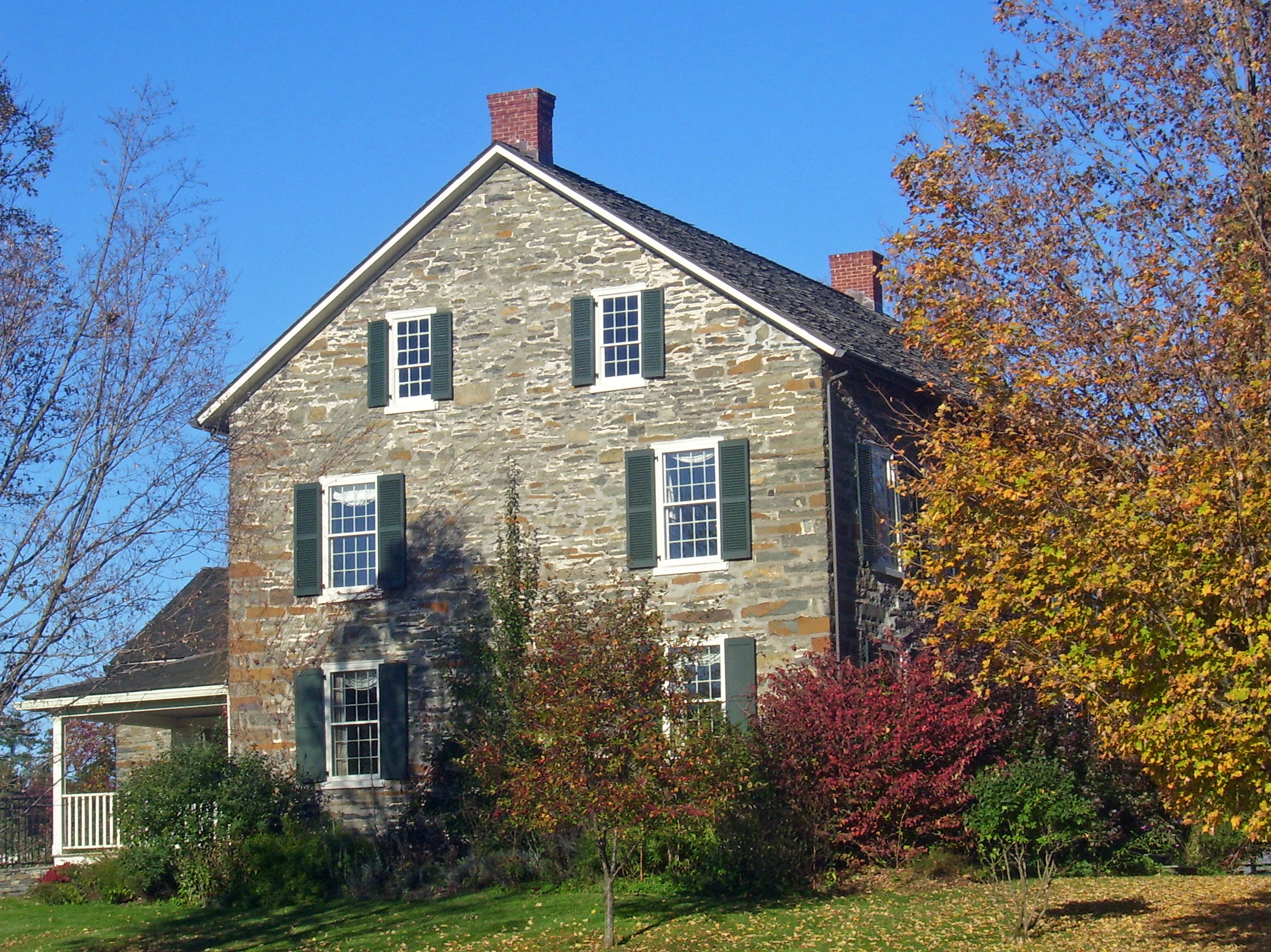
- West wing and south profile, 2008

- Location within New York Location within the United States
- Location: Kerhonkson, NY
- Nearest city: Kingston
- Coordinates: 41°47′47″N 74°17′27″W
- Area: 15 acres (6.1 ha)
- Built: 1800
- Architectural style: Georgian
- MPS: Rochester MPS
- NRHP reference No.: 97000108
- Added to NRHP: February 21, 1997

The Jacob Hoornbeck Stone House is located at the junction of Boice Mill and Drum Farm roads in Kerhonkson, New York, United States, a hamlet of the Town of Rochester in Ulster County. It was erected in the early 19th century using the Georgian architectural style, incorporating an earlier house as its rear wing.

It reflects a later generation of stone houses built by the descendants of Dutch settlers in the town, features like the full stone gable fields on either end. In 1999 it was listed on the National Register of Historic Places as part of a multiple property submission of stone houses in Rochester.

== Building ==
The house is located at the northwest corner of the junction of the two roads. It is on a 15-acre (6.1 ha) lot that straddles Boice Mill Road to Mill Brook south of the property, where the remains of a mill once on the site can be seen at the base of a steep waterfall. To the east, across Drum Farm Road, are barns built when the house was the center of a much larger dairy farm. The surrounding neighborhood is a rural area of fields and woodlots.

The building itself is a two-and-a-half-story five-bay stone structure topped with a gabled roof shingled in asphalt with two interior brick chimneys at either end. A one-and-a-half-story rear wing, the original house on the site, projects to the north at the east corner. It has a gabled roof shingled in asphalt with a modern porch over its eastern entrance. At the northwest corner a hip roofed porch also connects the two sections.

At the center of the south (front) facade of the main block is the recessed main entrance, a paneled door set between paneled pilasters with capitals that divide the sidelights. They support an entablature with a full-width similarly divided transom. There are two small two-over-two sash windows on either side. All other windows are 12-over-12 with louvered wooden shutters.

The paneled front door opens into a modified central hall divided into front and rear sections separated by an arched entryway. The hallway divides two rooms of equal size on either side. This arrangement is replicated on the second floor. The rear wing has a kitchen on the ground level and a loft upstairs. Throughout the building, all finishes are original.

== History ==
Records show the water rights to the property in the hands of Jacob Hoornbeck's family from 1703 onward. They established a mill on the brook near the property, the remains of which can still be seen. It is not known when the original house, which now serves as the kitchen wing, was built. The Georgian main block was added to it around the turn of the 19th century.

Later in that century the kitchen wing may have been used as a hoop shop. A few changes were made to the house during that period. A front porch was removed some time between 1967 and the property's listing on the Register. There have been no other significant alterations to the house in the course of its existence.

== See also ==
- National Register of Historic Places listings in Ulster County, New York
