= Peter W. Yates =

American lawyer-politician (1747–1826)

Coat of Arms of Peter Yates

Peter Waldron Yates (August 23, 1747 – 1826) was a lawyer and statesman from Albany, New York. He was a delegate to the Continental Congress in 1786.

Yates was the son of John G. and Rebecca Waldron Yates. His father was a blacksmith in Albany, but also owned a farm in Rensselaerswyck (in what is today the town of Bethlehem). Despite his background as one child in a large working-class family, Peter acquired an education, and read for the law. In 1767 he was admitted to the bar and married Ann Margarita Helms of New York City.

In 1768 Yates opened a law practice in Albany. His practice was very successful for over thirty years, even though interrupted by the Revolutionary War. In its later years he trained a number of young men in the law. His political career began in 1772 when he was elected to the Albany city council. He would be reelected annually for several years until the last council meeting under the colonial government in March 1776.

== American Revolutionary War ==
The revolution was a difficult time for Yates. He had been elected to the Committee of Correspondence for Albany in 1775 but resigned after only two months. He wrote an essay that expressed doubts over the direction of the revolution. When asked to rejoin the revolutionary committee, he declined and was never again entirely trusted by the rebels. He had close connections with the colonial establishment and ties to the landed interests. He took several steps to counter this. He left the Anglican Church and joined the Dutch Reformed Church in Albany. On June 28, 1775 he was appointed lieutenant colonel of the 2nd New York Regiment. He was a colonel of the Albany County militia from 1779 to 1780, and saw action around Lake Champlain. He continued to expand his law practice throughout the revolution.

== After War Years ==
When the active fighting in the revolution ended, Yates again entered politics. A long-time Freemason, he became an officer in the Albany lodge and was the Senior Grand Warden of the Grand Lodge of New York in 1784-1788. In 1784 he ran for the state assembly. He represented Albany there in 1784 and 1785. In 1786 they sent him to New York City as a delegate in the Continental Congress. This would be his last major office. During the debate over ratification of the United States Constitution, Yates was an active Anti-Federalist.

When removed from politics, his practice and investments thrived, and he became one of the most prosperous men in Albany. In 1794 his wife died, and in 1798 he remarried, this time to Mary Terbush (Ter Boss). He would have three more children with Mary, bringing his large family up to eleven children. He built a mansion on the south side of town, and only the Philip Schuyler house was more impressive.

In 1808 he was made a state judge for the western district of New York. In 1810 he moved to Montgomery County, New York, living on another property that he owned. He died there in Caughnawaga (now Fonda, New York) on March 9, 1826.
