= Louis Mayer =

Louis Mayer may refer to:

- Louis B. Mayer (1884–1957), American film producer
- Louis Mayer (painter) (1791–1843), German landscape painter
- Louis Mayer (lawyer) (1868–1941), Monegasque lawyer
- Louis Mayer (sculptor) (1869–1969), American painter and sculptor

== See also ==
- Louis Meyer (disambiguation)
