= Federalist No. 10 =

1787 essay by James Madison

- Author: James Madison
- Original title: The Utility of the Union as a Safeguard Against Domestic Faction and Insurrection
- Series: The Federalist
- Publication date: November 22, 1787
- Preceded by: Federalist No. 9
- Followed by: Federalist No. 11

Federalist No. 10 is an essay written by James Madison as the tenth of The Federalist Papers, a series of essays initiated by Alexander Hamilton arguing for the ratification of the United States Constitution. It was first published in the New York Daily Advertiser on November 22, 1787, under the name "Publius". Federalist No. 10 is among the most highly regarded works of American political thought.

No. 10 addresses how to reconcile citizens with interests contrary to the rights of others or inimical to the interests of the community as a whole. Madison saw factions as inevitable due to human nature: as long as people hold differing opinions and possess unequal amounts of wealth and property, they will form alliances with those most similar to them and may work against the public interest or infringe upon the rights of others. He thus asks how to guard against those dangers.

Federalist No. 10 continues the defense of an extended republic begun in Federalist No. 9. Madison argues that representation and the greater variety of interests in a large republic can make it harder for a factious majority to coordinate and violate the rights of minorities. Historians such as Charles A. Beard have read No. 10 as a rejection of direct democracy and factionalism in favor of representative democracy.

The Federalist is frequently cited by scholars and jurists in constitutional interpretation, although modern scholarship disputes how much authority the essays carry as evidence of the Constitution's original meaning. No. 10 has also figured in debates over political parties and campaign finance.

== Background ==
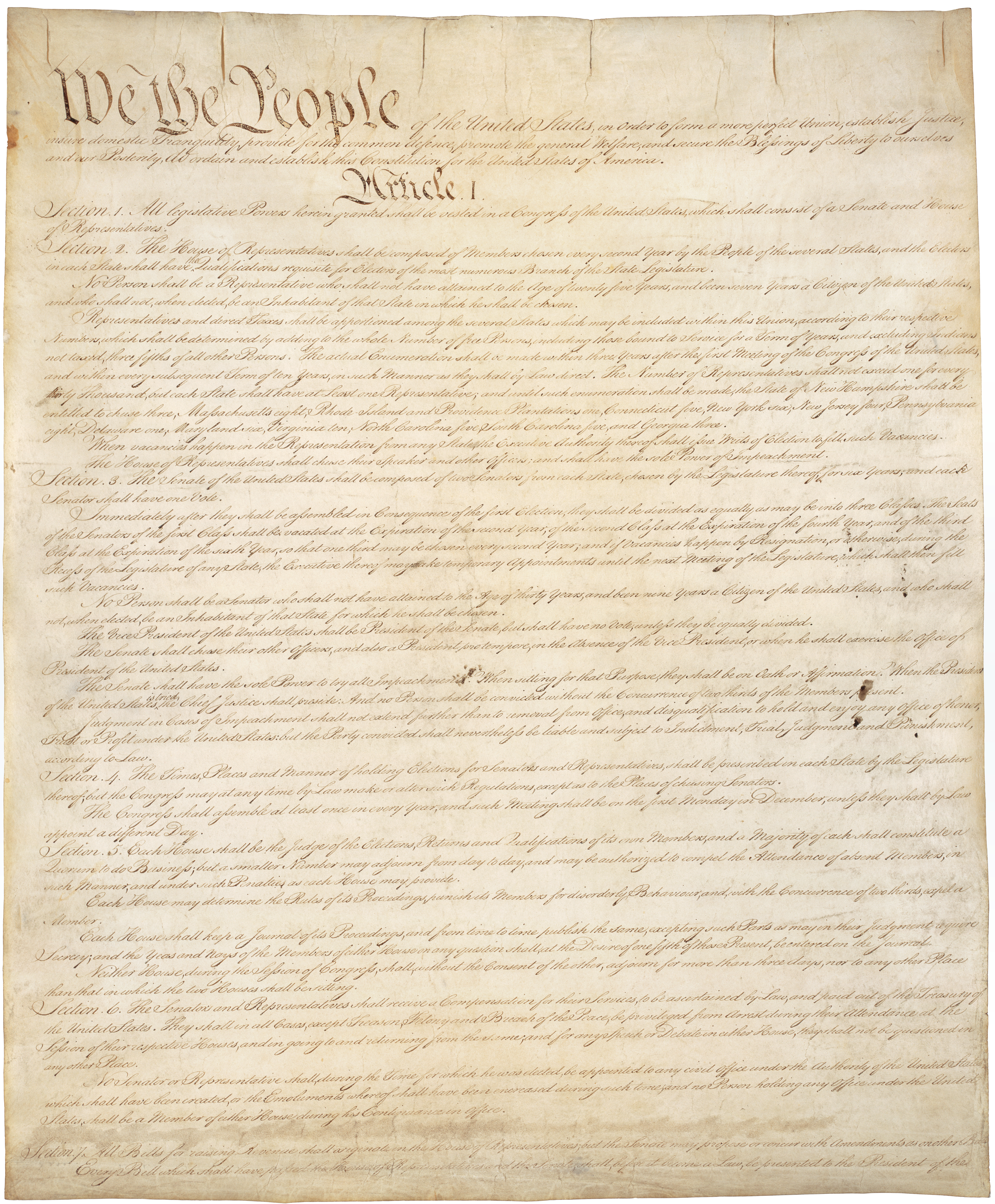
Preamble to the U.S. Constitution

Under the Articles of Confederation, the states retained sovereignty while Congress depended heavily on their compliance. Congress lacked an independent power to tax and ultimately failed to raise enough revenue to meet its expenses and service the debts incurred during the Revolutionary War.

Madison, George Washington, Benjamin Franklin and others feared a break-up of the union and national bankruptcy. Like Washington, Madison felt the revolution had not resolved the social problems that had triggered it, and the excesses ascribed to the King were now being repeated by the state legislatures. In this view, Shays' Rebellion, an armed uprising in Massachusetts in 1786, was one, albeit extreme, example of "democratic excess" in the aftermath of the war.

A national convention was called for May 1787 to revise the Articles of Confederation. Madison regarded abuses by state legislatures as a central cause of the crisis and proposed a federal veto over state laws; the Convention ultimately rejected that mechanism and relied instead on federal supremacy and preemption. The principal questions before the Convention included whether the states should remain sovereign, whether sovereignty should be transferred to the national government, or whether a settlement should rest somewhere in between. By mid-June, it was clear that the Convention was drafting a new plan of government around these issues—a constitution. Madison's Virginia Plan placed a strong national government at the center of the deliberations, but the Constitution that emerged rested on compromises among divergent state and national proposals. In a debate on June 26, Madison said that government ought to "protect the minority of the opulent against the majority" and that unchecked democratic communities were subject to "the turbulency and weakness of unruly passions".

== Publication ==
Paul Leicester Ford's summary preceding Federalist No. 10, from his 1898 edition of The Federalist

September 17, 1787, marked the signing of the final document. By its own Article Seven, the Constitution drafted by the Convention needed ratification by at least nine of the thirteen states, through special conventions held in each state. Anti-Federalist writers began to publish essays and letters arguing against ratification; for instance, "Cato" and "Brutus" debuted in New York papers on September 27 and October 18, 1787, respectively. Alexander Hamilton recruited James Madison and John Jay to write a series of pro-ratification letters in response.

Like most of the Federalist essays, No. 10 first appeared in a newspaper. It was first printed in the Daily Advertiser on November 22, 1787, under the name adopted by the Federalist writers, "Publius". In this it was unusual among the essays of Publius, as almost all of them first appeared in one of two other papers: the Independent Journal and the New-York Packet. Federalist No. 37, also by Madison, was the only other essay to appear first in the Advertiser.

Considering the importance later ascribed to the essay, it was reprinted on a limited scale. On November 23, it appeared in the Packet and the next day in the Independent Journal. Outside New York City, it made four appearances in early 1788: January 2 in The Pennsylvania Gazette, January 10 in the Hudson Valley Weekly, January 15 in the Lansingburgh Northern Centinel, and January 17 in the Albany Gazette. Though this number of reprintings was typical for The Federalist essays, many other essays, both Federalist and Anti-Federalist, saw much wider distribution.

On January 1, 1788, the publishing company J. & A. McLean announced that it would publish the first 36 of the essays in a single volume. This volume, titled The Federalist, was published on March 22, 1788. George Hopkins's 1802 edition identified Madison, Hamilton, and Jay as the authors of the series, with two later printings dividing the work by author. In 1818, James Gideon published a third edition containing corrections by Madison, who by that time had completed his two terms as president of the United States.

Henry B. Dawson's edition of 1863 sought to collect the original newspaper articles, though he did not always find the first instance. It was much reprinted, albeit without his introduction. Paul Leicester Ford's 1898 edition included a table of contents that summarized the essays, with the summaries again used to preface their respective essays. The first date of publication and the newspaper name were recorded for each essay. Jacob E. Cooke's 1961 edition reproduces the newspaper texts, records textual and numbering variants, and remains a standard scholarly edition.

== Arguments ==
=== Definition and causes of faction ===
Federalist No. 10 continues the discussion of the question broached in Hamilton's Federalist No. 9. Hamilton there addressed the destructive role of a faction in breaking apart the republic. The question Madison answers, then, is how to eliminate the negative effects of faction. Madison defines a faction as "a number of citizens, whether amounting to a minority or majority of the whole, who are united and actuated by some common impulse of passion, or of interest, adverse to the rights of other citizens, or to the permanent and aggregate interests of the community." He also traces faction to differences of opinion in political life, including disputes over preferred regimes and religions.

Madison argues that "the most common and durable source of factions has been the various and unequal distribution of property." He states, "Those who hold and those who are without property have ever formed distinct interests in society." Providing some examples of the distinct interests, Madison identified a landed interest, a manufacturing interest, a mercantile interest, a moneyed interest, and "many lesser interests". Madison insists that they all belonged to "different classes" that were "actuated by different sentiments and views." Thus, Madison argues, these different classes would be prone to make decisions in their own interest, and not for the public good. A law regarding private debts, for instance, would be "a question to which the creditors are parties on one side, and the debtors on the other." To this question, and to others like it, Madison notes that, though "justice ought to hold the balance between them," the interested parties would reach different conclusions, "neither with a sole regard to justice and the public good."

Like the Anti-Federalists who opposed him, Madison was substantially influenced by the work of Montesquieu, though Madison and Montesquieu disagreed on the question addressed in this essay. Madison also drew important insights about faction from David Hume, but recent scholarship cautions against treating his thought as simply Humean: John Witherspoon, Francis Hutcheson, and Thomas Reid also shaped his understanding of self-government.

=== Remedies for faction ===
Madison first theorizes that there are two ways to limit the damage caused by faction: either remove the causes of faction or control its effects. He then describes the two methods to remove the causes of faction. The first is destroying liberty, which would work because "liberty is to faction what air is to fire", but Madison rejects it as a remedy worse than the disease: liberty is essential to political life, just as air is "essential to animal life".

The second option—giving every citizen the same opinions, passions, and interests—is impracticable. Madison links unequal property holdings to differing human faculties and calls the protection of those faculties—not economic inequality itself—"the first object of government". He also identifies religious, political, and personal attachments as sources of faction. Madison concludes that the damage caused by faction can be limited only by controlling its effects.

Madison treats majority faction as the central constitutional danger: a minority faction can ordinarily be defeated by vote, whereas a factious majority can use popular government itself to sacrifice rights or the public good. He offers two ways to check majority factions: prevent the "existence of the same passion or interest in a majority at the same time" or render a majority faction unable to act. Madison concludes that a small democracy cannot avoid the dangers of majority faction because small size means that undesirable passions can easily spread to a majority of the people, which can then enact its will through the democratic government.

Madison states, "The latent causes of faction are thus sown in the nature of man", so the cure is to control their effects. He argues that this is not possible in a pure democracy but is possible in a republic. By pure democracy, he means a system in which every citizen votes directly on laws, and by republic, he means a society in which citizens elect a small body of representatives who then vote on laws. Madison argues that representation may "refine and enlarge" public views, while acknowledging that representatives may themselves pursue factious interests.

=== The extended republic ===
He then argues in favor of a large republic over a small republic as a means of choosing "fit characters" to represent the public's voice. In a large republic, where the number of voters and candidates is greater, the probability of electing competent representatives is higher. The voters have a wider choice. It would also be easier for candidates to fool voters in a small republic than in a large one.

Modern voting theory has treated Madison's claim about the greater probability of a "fit choice" as a testable distinction between direct and representative democracy.

The last argument Madison makes in favor of a large republic is that, in a small republic, there will be less variety of interests and parties, so a majority will more frequently be found. The number of participants in that majority will be lower, and, since they live in a more limited territory, it would be easier for them to agree and work together for the accomplishment of their ideas. In a very large republic, the variety of interests will be greater, making it harder to find a majority. Even if there is a majority, it would be harder for them to work together because of the large number of people and the fact that they are spread out over a wider territory.

A republic, Madison writes, is different from a democracy because its government is placed in the hands of delegates and can therefore be extended over a larger area. In a large republic there will be more "fit characters" from whom to choose, while selecting each representative from a larger constituency should make the "vicious arts" of electioneering less effective. Madison also argues that representatives can "refine and enlarge" public views by passing them through a chosen body of citizens.

Although Madison argued for a large and diverse republic, Federalist No. 2 emphasized national cohesion. John Jay counted as a blessing that America possessed "one united people—a people descended from the same ancestors, the same language, professing the same religion". Madison himself addresses a limitation of his conclusion that large constituencies will provide better representatives. He notes that if constituencies are too large, the representatives will be "too little acquainted with all their local circumstances and lesser interests". He says that this problem is partly solved by federalism. No matter how large the constituencies of federal representatives, local matters will be looked after by state and local officials with naturally smaller constituencies.

== Reception and legacy ==
=== Anti-Federalist responses ===
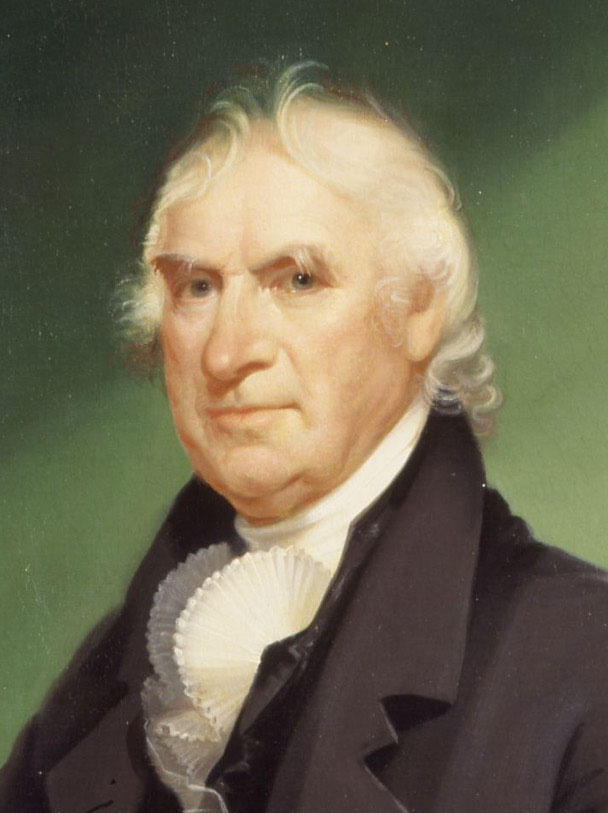
George Clinton, traditionally proposed as the Anti-Federalist writer Cato; the attribution is disputed

The Anti-Federalists vigorously contested the notion that a republic of diverse interests could survive. The author "Cato"—a pseudonym whose identity remains disputed—summarized the Anti-Federalist position in the article Cato No. 3.

Whoever seriously considers the immense extent of territory comprehended within the limits of the United States, with the variety of its climates, productions, and commerce, the difference of extent, and number of inhabitants in all; the dissimilitude of interest, morals, and policies, in almost every one, will receive it as an intuitive truth, that a consolidated republican form of government therein, can never form a perfect union, establish justice, insure domestic tranquility, promote the general welfare, and secure the blessings of liberty to you and your posterity, for to these objects it must be directed: this unkindred legislature therefore, composed of interests opposite and dissimilar in their nature, will in its exercise, emphatically be, like a house divided against itself.

Many Anti-Federalists maintained that republics about the size of the individual states could survive, but that a republic the size of the Union would fail. The sectional conflict that culminated in the American Civil War centered on slavery and disputes over its expansion. Madison himself, in a letter to Thomas Jefferson, noted that differing economic interests had created dispute even when the Constitution was being written. At the Convention, he particularly identified the distinction between the northern and southern states as a "line of discrimination" that formed "the real difference of interests".

The discussion of the ideal size for the republic was not limited to the options of individual states or an encompassing union. In a letter to Richard Price, Benjamin Rush noted that "Some of our enlightened men who begin to despair of a more complete union of the States in Congress have secretly proposed an Eastern, Middle, and Southern Confederacy, to be united by an alliance offensive and defensive". Such proposals were not a general Anti-Federalist program: nearly all critics sought to preserve and strengthen the Union, and claims that they broadly favored several confederacies lack evidence.

In making their arguments, the Anti-Federalists appealed to both historical and theoretic evidence. On the theoretical side, they leaned heavily on the work of Charles de Secondat, Baron de Montesquieu. The Anti-Federalists Brutus and Cato both quoted Montesquieu on the issue of the ideal size of a republic, citing his statement in The Spirit of the Laws that

It is natural to a republic to have only a small territory, otherwise it cannot long subsist. In a large republic there are men of large fortunes, and consequently of less moderation; there are trusts too great to be placed in any single subject; he has interest of his own; he soon begins to think that he may be happy, great and glorious, by oppressing his fellow citizens; and that he may raise himself to grandeur on the ruins of his country. In a large republic, the public good is sacrificed to a thousand views; it is subordinate to exceptions, and depends on accidents. In a small one, the interest of the public is easier perceived, better understood, and more within the reach of every citizen; abuses are of less extent, and of course are less protected.

Greece and Rome were looked to as model republics throughout this debate, and authors on both sides took Roman pseudonyms. Brutus points out that the Greek and Roman states were small, whereas the United States was vast. He also argues that the expansion of these republics resulted in a transition from free government to tyranny.

=== Modern scholarship ===
In the first century of the American republic, No. 10 was not regarded as among the more important numbers of The Federalist. For example, in Democracy in America, Alexis de Tocqueville refers specifically to more than fifty of the essays, but No. 10 is not among them. By the twentieth century, however, No. 10 had become a seminal work of American political philosophy. In "The People's Vote", a popular survey conducted by the National Archives and Records Administration, National History Day, and U.S. News & World Report, No. 10 (along with Federalist No. 51, also by Madison) was chosen as the 20th most influential document in United States history. David Epstein, writing in 1984, described it as among the most highly regarded of all American political writings.

The historian Charles A. Beard identified Federalist No. 10 as one of the most important documents for understanding the Constitution. Beard read the essay as favoring representative over direct democracy to counter factionalism. In his book An Economic Interpretation of the Constitution of the United States (1913), Beard argued that Madison produced a detailed explanation of the economic factors that lay behind the creation of the Constitution. At the outset of his study, Beard writes that Madison provided "a masterly statement of the theory of economic determinism in politics". Later in his study, Beard repeated his point, providing more emphasis. "The most philosophical examination of the foundations of political science is made by Madison in the tenth number," Beard writes. "Here he lays down, in no uncertain language, the principle that the first and elemental concern of every government is economic".

Douglass Adair attributes the increased interest in the tenth number to Beard's book. Adair also contends that Beard's selective focus on the issue of class struggle and his political progressivism have colored modern scholarship on the essay. According to Adair, Beard reads No. 10 as evidence for his belief in "the Constitution as an instrument of class exploitation". Adair's own view is that Federalist No. 10 should be read as "eighteenth-century political theory directed to an eighteenth-century problem; and ... one of the great creative achievements of that intellectual movement that later ages have christened 'Jeffersonian democracy'". Recent scholarship agrees that Beard made No. 10 central to modern interpretation, while treating its influence on ratification and its place at the core of Madison's thought as disputed.

Garry Wills is a noted critic of Madison's argument in Federalist No. 10. In his book Explaining America, he adopts the position of Robert Dahl in arguing that Madison's framework does not necessarily enhance the protections of minorities or ensure the common good. Wills contends that constitutional machinery may merely "clog, delay, slow down, hamper, and obstruct the majority", whether or not that majority is factious. In a later reassessment, Dahl argued that two centuries of comparative experience contradicted Madison's size hypothesis and emphasized that Madison's post-1787 thought became more accepting of organized party opposition and majority rule.

=== Judicial use ===
The Federalist is often cited in constitutional interpretation, although scholars dispute how much authority the essays carry as evidence of the Constitution's original meaning. Federalist No. 10 is sometimes cited as evidence that the constitutional framers distrusted partisan division. The founding-era concept of faction should not, however, be equated mechanically with the modern political party: the constitutional design did not anticipate parties as the intermediary institutions they became. For instance, U.S. Supreme Court justice John Paul Stevens cited the essay for the statement that "Parties ranked high on the list of evils that the Constitution was designed to check". Justice Byron White cited the essay while discussing a California provision that forbids candidates from running as independents within one year of holding a partisan affiliation, saying, "California apparently believes with the Founding Fathers that splintered parties and unrestrained factionalism may do significant damage to the fabric of government."

Madison's argument that restraining liberty to limit faction is an unacceptable solution has been used by opponents of campaign finance limits. Justice Clarence Thomas, for example, invoked Federalist No. 10 in a dissent against a ruling supporting limits on campaign contributions, writing: "The Framers preferred a political system that harnessed such faction for good, preserving liberty while also ensuring good government. Rather than adopting the repressive 'cure' for faction that the majority today endorses, the Framers armed individual citizens with a remedy." Contemporary campaign-finance scholarship has also used a "neo-Madisonian" framework while qualifying the founding model in light of political parties and inequalities within pluralist participation.

== Bibliography ==
=== Secondary sources ===
- Adair, Douglass (1998). Colbourn, Trevor (ed.). Fame and the Founding Fathers. Indianapolis: Liberty Fund. ISBN 978-0-86597-193-6.
- Ball, Terence (2003). The Federalist: With Letters of "Brutus". Cambridge University Press. doi:10.1017/CBO9780511817816. ISBN 978-0-521-00121-2.
- Bartrum, Ian C. (2010). "Constructing the Constitutional Canon: The Metonymic Evolution of Federalist 10". Constitutional Commentary. 27 (1): 9–38.
- Beard, Charles A. (1913). An Economic Interpretation of the Constitution of the United States. New York: Macmillan.
- Bernstein, Richard B. (1987). Are We to Be a Nation? The Making of the Constitution. Cambridge, Massachusetts: Harvard University Press. ISBN 978-0-674-04476-0.
- Cohler, Anne M. (1988). Montesquieu's Comparative Politics and the Spirit of American Constitutionalism. Lawrence: University Press of Kansas. ISBN 978-0-7006-0376-3.
- Dahl, Robert A. (2005). "James Madison: Republican or Democrat?". Perspectives on Politics. 3 (3): 439–448. doi:10.1017/S1537592705050280. JSTOR 3689017.
- DePauw, Linda Grant (1966). The Eleventh Pillar: New York State and the Federal Constitution. Ithaca, New York: Cornell University Press. ISBN 978-0-8014-0104-6.
- Edling, Max M. (2003). A Revolution in Favor of Government: Origins of the U.S. Constitution and the Making of the American State. Oxford University Press. doi:10.1093/0195148703.001.0001. ISBN 978-0-19-514870-1.
- Epstein, David F. (1984). The Political Theory of The Federalist. Chicago: University of Chicago Press. ISBN 978-0-226-21300-2.
- Furtwangler, Albert (1984). The Authority of Publius: A Reading of the Federalist Papers. Ithaca, New York: Cornell University Press. ISBN 978-0-8014-1643-9.
- Gibson, Alan (2020). "Madison's Republican Remedy: The Tenth Federalist and the Creation of an Impartial Republic". In Rakove, Jack N.; Sheehan, Colleen A. (eds.). The Cambridge Companion to The Federalist. Cambridge University Press. pp. 263–301. doi:10.1017/9781316479865.009. ISBN 978-1-107-13639-7.
- Gustafson, Thomas (1992). Representative Words: Politics, Literature, and the American Language, 1776–1865. Cambridge University Press. ISBN 978-0-521-39512-0.
- Harrold, Stanley (2019). "The Antebellum War over Slavery". In Sheehan-Dean, Aaron (ed.). The Cambridge History of the American Civil War. Vol. 2. Cambridge University Press. pp. 3–23. doi:10.1017/9781316650707.002. ISBN 978-1-107-15453-7.
- Johnson, Calvin H. (2005). "The Superiority of the Extended Republic". Righteous Anger at the Wicked States: The Meaning of the Founders' Constitution. Cambridge University Press. pp. 61–73. doi:10.1017/CBO9780511511141.005. ISBN 978-0-521-85232-6.
- Johnson, Joel A. (October 2008). "'Brutus' and 'Cato' Unmasked: General John Williams's Role in the New York Ratification Debate, 1787–88" (PDF). Proceedings of the American Antiquarian Society. 118 (2): 297–337.
- Kaminski, John P. (1993). George Clinton: Yeoman Politician of the New Republic. Madison: State Historical Society of Wisconsin. ISBN 978-0-945612-17-9.
- Kloppenberg, James T. (2019). "To Promote the General Welfare: Why Madison Matters". The Supreme Court Review. 2019: 355–384.
- Kundmueller, Michelle M. (2023). "The Anti-Federalists: Planting the Seeds of American Populism?" (PDF). Harvard Journal of Law & Public Policy. 46 (1): 21–30.
- Maggs, Gregory E. (2007). "A Concise Guide to the Federalist Papers as a Source of the Original Meaning of the United States Constitution" (PDF). Boston University Law Review. 87: 801–847.
- Malbin, Michael J. (2021). "A Neo-Madisonian Perspective on Campaign Finance Reform, Institutions, Pluralism, and Small Donors". University of Pennsylvania Journal of Constitutional Law. 23 (5): 907–959.
- Manweller, Mathew (2005). The People Vs. the Courts: Judicial Review and Direct Democracy in the American Legal System. Academica Press. ISBN 978-1-930901-97-1.
- Morgan, Edmund S. (1986). "Safety in Numbers: Madison, Hume, and the Tenth 'Federalist'". Huntington Library Quarterly. 49 (2): 95–112. doi:10.2307/3817178. JSTOR 3817178.
- Pildes, Richard H. (2014). "Romanticizing Democracy, Political Fragmentation, and the Decline of American Government". Yale Law Journal. 124 (3): 804–852.
- Rakove, Jack N.; Sheehan, Colleen A. (2020). "Introduction". The Cambridge Companion to The Federalist. Cambridge University Press. pp. 1–17. doi:10.1017/9781316479865.001. ISBN 978-1-107-13639-7.
- Robertson, David Brian (2013). The Original Compromise: What the Constitution's Framers Were Really Thinking. Oxford University Press. doi:10.1093/acprof:oso/9780199796298.001.0001. ISBN 978-0-19-979629-8.
- Schofield, Norman (2009). "'The probability of a fit choice': American political history and voting theory". In Dowding, Keith; Goodin, Robert E.; Pateman, Carole (eds.). Justice and Democracy: Essays for Brian Barry. Cambridge University Press. pp. 59–78. doi:10.1017/CBO9780511490217.004.
- Schwartz, David S.; Mikhail, John (2021). "The Other Madison Problem". Fordham Law Review. 89 (5): 2033–2083.
- Siemers, David J. (2020). "Publius and the Anti-Federalists: 'A Satisfactory Answer to All the Objections'?". In Rakove, Jack N.; Sheehan, Colleen A. (eds.). The Cambridge Companion to The Federalist. Cambridge University Press. pp. 18–51. doi:10.1017/9781316479865.002. ISBN 978-1-107-13639-7.
- Stewart, David O. (2007). The Summer of 1787: The Men Who Invented the Constitution. New York: Simon & Schuster. ISBN 978-0-7432-8692-3.
- Weiner, Greg (2013). "James Madison and the Legitimacy of Majority Factions". American Political Thought. 2 (2): 198–216. doi:10.1086/673131.
- Wills, Garry (1981). Explaining America: The Federalist. Garden City, New York: Doubleday. ISBN 978-0-385-14689-0.
- Wood, Gordon S. (1998). The Creation of the American Republic, 1776–1787. Chapel Hill: University of North Carolina Press. ISBN 978-0-8078-4723-7.
- Wood, Gordon S. (2011). The Idea of America: Reflections on the Birth of the United States. New York: Penguin Press. ISBN 978-1-59420-290-2.
- Wood, Gordon S. (2021). Power and Liberty: Constitutionalism in the American Revolution. Oxford University Press. doi:10.1093/oso/9780197546918.001.0001. ISBN 978-0-19-754691-8.
- Zubia, Aaron Alexander (2026). "Beyond Hume: Recovering the Scottish Enlightenment Background of James Madison's Thought". The Review of Politics. 88 (3): 297–317. doi:10.1017/S0034670526100734.

=== Primary sources ===
- Hamilton, Alexander; Madison, James; Jay, John (1961). Cooke, Jacob E. (ed.). The Federalist. Middletown, Connecticut: Wesleyan University Press.
- Hamilton, Alexander; Madison, James; Jay, John (1863). Dawson, Henry B. (ed.). The Federalist: A Collection of Essays, Written in Favor of the New Constitution, As Agreed Upon by the Fœderal Convention, September 17, 1787. Morrisania, New York: Charles Scribner.
- Hamilton, Alexander; Madison, James; Jay, John (1898). Ford, Paul Leicester (ed.). The Federalist. New York: Henry Holt.
- Kaminski, John P.; Saladino, Gaspare J., eds. (1981). The Documentary History of the Ratification of the Constitution. Madison: State Historical Society of Wisconsin. ISBN 978-0-87020-372-5.
- Storing, Herbert J.; Dry, Murray, eds. (1981). The Complete Anti-Federalist. Vol. 1–7. Chicago: University of Chicago Press. ISBN 0-226-77566-6.
- Yates, Robert (1886). Notes of the Secret Debate of the Federal Convention of 1787. Washington, D.C.: Templeman.
- "Storer v. Brown, 415 U.S. 724 (1974)". United States Reports. U.S. Government Publishing Office.
- "Nixon v. Shrink Missouri Government PAC, 528 U.S. 377 (2000)". United States Reports. U.S. Government Publishing Office.
- "California Democratic Party v. Jones, 530 U.S. 567 (2000)". United States Reports. U.S. Government Publishing Office.
