= Federalist No. 9 =

Political essay by Alexander Hamilton

- As first published in the Independent Journal, alongside Federalist No. 8
- Author: Alexander Hamilton
- Original title: The Union as a Safeguard Against Domestic Faction and Insurrection
- Language: English
- Series: The Federalist
- Publisher: Independent Journal
- Publication date: November 21, 1787
- Publication place: United States
- Media type: Newspaper
- Preceded by: Federalist No. 8
- Followed by: Federalist No. 10
- Text: Federalist No. 9 at Wikisource

Federalist No. 9, titled "The Union as a Safeguard Against Domestic Faction and Insurrection", is a political essay by Alexander Hamilton and the ninth of The Federalist Papers. It was first published in the New York Daily Advertiser and the Independent Journal on November 21, 1787, under the pseudonym used for all Federalist Papers, Publius. The essay argues that large republics can achieve stability, and that they do not inevitably lead to tyranny as his opponents believe. It expressed ideas that became the foundation of Federalist No. 10, the most influential in the series.

Federalist No. 9 was a rebuttal to an Anti-Federalist argument based on the arguments of the political philosopher Montesquieu, which held that a republic as large as the United States would be unsustainable. Hamilton responded with other writings of Montesquieu, presenting the argument that a larger republic could exist as a confederation of states like the one proposed in the Constitution. Hamilton distinguished a potential American republic from the failed republics of ancient Greece and Italy, arguing that insurrection from one state would be kept in check by the others, preventing tyranny from consuming the entire nation.

== Summary ==
Publius (Hamilton) argues that the American states must unite to avoid the failures of the Ancient Greek and Roman republics. He criticizes those who think that republics are not feasible, contending that new developments in political science allow for a successful republic and that state unions throughout history have been shown to benefit their members. He cites separation of powers, checks and balances, judicial service during good behavior, and representative democracy.

The author acknowledges the anti-constitution argument, from Montesquieu, that only small republics can resist tyranny. He counters that Montesquieu's vision of a small republic is not applicable to the American states, as splitting them into smaller commonwealths would cause them to war with one another or necessitate that they are governed under monarchy. Publius quotes another argument of Montesquieu to demonstrate the philosopher's support for a confederate republic to accommodate a larger state. The author emphasizes that such a government would be several states coexisting instead of a single entity. He concludes by quoting Montesquieu's description of Lycia as a successful confederate republic.

== Background and publication ==
Federalist No. 9 was written by Alexander Hamilton. Following the Constitutional Convention in 1787, Hamilton worked with James Madison and John Jay to write a series of essays to explain the provisions of the Constitution of the United States and persuade New York to ratify it. They published these essays in New York newspapers under the shared pseudonym Publius. Federalist No. 9 was first published in the New York Daily Advertiser and the Independent Journal on November 21, 1787, and then in the New-York Packet on November 23, 1787. It continued from Federalist Nos. 6–8, which covered insurrection from the states instead of domestic factions.

Political philosophy in the time of The Federalist Papers held that republics were inherently unstable. Shortly before the publication of Federalist No. 9, Cato of the Anti-Federalist Papers wrote his third essay in the New-York Journal. He cited The Spirit of Law by the French philosopher Montesquieu, which argued that large nations could not survive as republics. Montesquieu had argued that a large republic was impossible because such a large group of people could not share the same culture and values. Montesquieu believed that the will of the public can only be determined among a small group, while a large nation will see it diluted among its many citizens.

== Analysis ==
Alexander Hamilton, author of Federalist No. 9

=== Ancient republics ===
Hamilton took a strong position in the opening of Federalist No. 9, describing ancient Greece and Rome as mere "petty republics" compared to the proposed constitution. By contrasting it with the nations regarded as the founders of Western civilization, he implied that the United States was creating an entirely new type of civilization. This was a rare instance in The Federalist Papers that did not look back at the ancient republics fondly.

Hamilton described the weaknesses of historic republics so he could distance previous failures from the republic he wished to create. He cited modern understanding of political science as an advantage the United States had over the ancient republics, including separation of powers and representative government. Federalist No. 9 introduces another political development in the "enlargement of the orbit". With this idea, he casts the size of the United States as an advantage, saying that the states can function as both individual entities and as one collective group. Unlike most of The Federalist Papers that take a tone of warning, his thoughts on scientific progress present an optimism derived from Enlightenment philosophy.

Hamilton's argument in Federalist No. 8 was partly inspired by Madison's comments at the Constitutional Convention. Listening to Madison's speeches, Hamilton wrote into his notes: "the way to prevent a majority from having an interest to oppress the minority is to enlarge the sphere".

=== Montesquieu and the Anti-Federalists ===
The goal of Federalist No. 9 was to counter the argument by Montesquieu raised by the Anti-Federalists. This idea was pushed heavily in the Anti-Federalist Papers, argued by Agrippa, Brutus, Cato, and Centinel. They believed that a unification of the states would create a nation too large to be a republic, citing the tyranny that developed as Greece and Rome expanded. Brutus further argued that it would be unwise to experiment with new forms of government, believing that if it could be done successfully, then it already would have been done.

Federalist No. 9 less original argumentation, instead analyzing the arguments of the Anti-Federalists and Montesquieu. Montesquieu was the most referenced of any political philosopher in The Federalist Papers, but Federalist No. 9 referenced his ideas to refute them, rejecting the argument from authority. Hamilton noted that the American states were already larger than the ancient republics, and argued that if Montesquieu's analysis was applicable to the United States, then anything other than splitting into countless small entities would cause the nation to fall into monarchy. One Montesquieu quote cited by Hamilton proposed an "assemblage of societies", similar to the federalism Hamilton supported. Hamilton also presented Montesquieu's suggestion that Lycia was an ideal of confederation with its cities of varying size and strength.

=== Form of government ===
Hamilton described good government as a balance between anarchy and tyranny, arguing that the new republicanism of the United States would be the first form of government to reliably maintain such a balance. One of the foremost purposes of the proposed government cited by Hamilton was to prevent societal instability caused by a constant military threat between the states. In the philosophy of Adam Smith, the preservation of stability in this fashion directly benefits everyone in society by allowing a setting for the production of economic value.

Hamilton is less adamant about a strong central government in Federalist No. 9 relative to his position in the previous Federalist Papers, making a distinction between a confederated union of states versus a strong unitary state. As with the maintenance of a national government, Hamilton believed that only in unification could the states challenge a national government should a revolution become necessary. Citing Montesquieu, he argued that a union of the states would protect itself from tyranny because any tyrant who gained influence in one state would be opposed by the other states.

== Legacy ==
Federalist No. 9 served as a lead-in to Federalist No. 10, which was written by James Madison and became the most well-known of The Federalist Papers. Hamilton's concept of "enlarging the orbit" in No. 9 was reintroduced in No. 10 as "extending the sphere". John Quincy Adams mentioned the connection between the two papers when delivering a eulogy for Madison. He described Nos. 9 and 10 as "rival dissertations on Faction and its remedy". Hamilton's approach of strengthening the national government contrasted with Madison's more republican inclination. After Madison's writings in No. 10, Hamilton revisited the government's ability to suppress dangerous factions several more times throughout The Federalist Papers.

Madison revisited the ideal size of a republic in Federalist No. 14, when he said that a democracy must be small while a republic can be small or large, challenging Anti-Federalists who would invoke Montesquieu. Hamilton repeated his belief that Lycia was the ideal confederation in Federalist No. 16, offering a more refined version of the argument and adding the Achaeans as another example. Another attempt was made to define the Federalist government in Federalist No. 39, but it is not consistent with the one laid out in Federalist No. 9. Additional essays in the series continued Hamilton's challenge against anti-federalist invocations of Montesquieu.

Other Federalists participated in the Montesquieu debate separately from The Federalist Papers: Americanus disagreed that European philosophies applied to the circumstances of the United States, and A Citizen of America wrote that the ancient republics lacked the core values of republicanism held by Americans. Hamilton again wrote on the issue of large republics when helping George Washington draft his Farewell Address, though Washington chose not to include this passage.

Supreme Court Justice Sandra Day O'Connor cited Federalist No. 9 in Heath v. Alabama (1985) to demonstrate specific aspects of sovereignty that states are expected to have, though this was not a significant influence in her overall argument. The practical application of political science remains a perennial issue. In the United States, the usefulness of scientific claims may be challenged by religious arguments that science is another form of faith or the postmodernist idea that there is no such thing as scientific truth.
