= Louis Meyer (disambiguation) =

Louis Meyer (1904–1995) was an American racing driver.

Louis Meyer may also refer to:

- Louis Meyer (businessman) (1843–1929), Danish businessman
- Louis Meyer (poet) (1796–1869), Polish poet
- L.A. Meyer (Louis A. Meyer, 1942–2014), American writer
- Louis B. Meyer (1933–1999), American jurist
- Louis H. Meyer (1876–1960), American politician

== See also ==
- Louis Mayer (disambiguation)
