= Louis Mayer (sculptor) =

American painter and sculptor (1869–1969)

Louis Mayer (1869–1969) was an American painter and sculptor, best known for his monumental and portrait bronzes, including of Abraham Lincoln.

== Life ==
Mayer was born on 26 November 1869 in Milwaukee, Wisconsin, the youngest child of German immigrant parents. His father Frederick Mayer was a shoemaker from Hesse-Darmstadt, who moved to the US in 1851.

Mayer began working as a photographer and woodcarver, but wanted to be an artist. He trained at the Wisconsin Art Institute, studying with Richard Lorenz and Otto von Ernst. He continued his studies in Germany at the Weimar Art School, then the Munich Academy of Fine Arts, 1894–1896. The following year, 1897, he became a student at the Académie Julian in Paris.

He returned to Milwaukee c.1900, where he taught at the Wisconsin School of Art, and opened his studio. In 1900 he became the first president of the Society of Milwaukee Artists, which subsequently (1913) became the Wisconsin Painters and Sculptors.

Mayer moved to New York in 1913 and opened a studio on West 42nd Street, where he began sculpting. In 1915 he bought a large property, which he named Joyous Mountain, near Fishkill, north of New York City. He kept this home and studio, although he also spent time in Carmel, California.

He married twice. He died in Carmel, California, on 21 January 1969.

== Awards and Honours ==
• He received a silver medal for oil paintings at the 1915 Panama-Pacific Exposition in San Francisco.

== Bronze sculpture ==
The following is a selection of his work:#

- Abraham Lincoln
- Albert Schweitzer
- Eugene V. Debs
- Walt Whitman
- Gilbert Reid (founder of the International Institute of China)
- William McKinley Birthplace Memorial in Niles, Ohio.
