= Fishkill, New York =

- Village
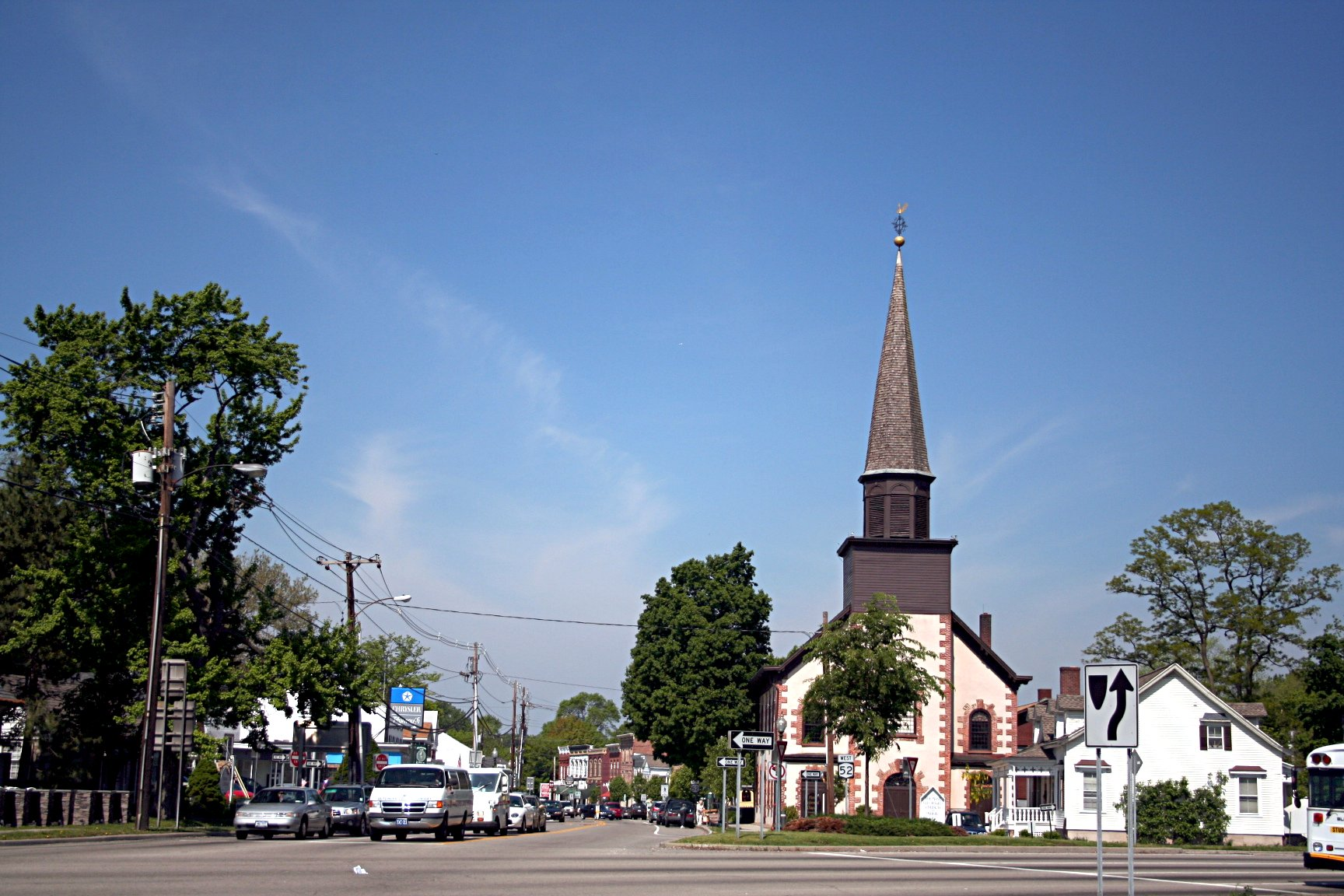
- Village entrance on Main Street with; the First Reformed Church to the right

- Seal

- Location of Fishkill, New York

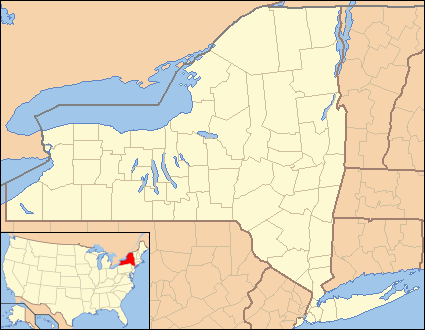
- Location within New York
- Coordinates: 41°32′3″N 73°53′57″W
- Country: United States
- State: New York
- County: Dutchess
- Town: Fishkill

Government
  - Type: Village Board of Trustees
  - Mayor: Kathleen Martin

Area
  - Total: 0.83 sq mi (2.16 km^{2})
  - Land: 0.83 sq mi (2.15 km^{2})
  - Water: 0.0039 sq mi (0.01 km^{2})
- Elevation: 220 ft (67 m)

Population (2020)
  - Total: 2,166
  - Density: 2,604.1/sq mi (1,005.44/km^{2})
- Time zone: UTC-5 (Eastern (EST))
  - Summer (DST): UTC-4 (EDT)
- ZIP code: 12524
- Area code: 845
- FIPS code: 36-25967
- GNIS feature ID: 0977519
- Website: www.vofishkill.gov

Fishkill is a village within the town of Fishkill in Dutchess County, New York, United States. As of the 2020 census, Fishkill had a population of 2,166. The village is in the eastern part of the town of Fishkill on U.S. Route 9, bordering on Fishkill Creek. It is north of Interstate 84. NY 52 is the main street. It is part of the Kiryas Joel–Poughkeepsie–Newburgh metropolitan area as well as the larger New York metropolitan area. The first U. S. Post Office in New York state was established in Fishkill by Samuel Loudon, its first Postmaster.

== History ==
Perspective map of Fishkill-on-the-Hudson and list of landmarks from 1886 by L.R. Burleigh

Fishkill is located in the former territory of the Wappinger people. It was part of the Rombout Patent granted to Francis Rombouts, Gulian VerPlanck, and Stephanus Van Cortlandt of New Amsterdam in 1685. The name "Fishkill" evolved from two Dutch words, vis (fish) and kil (stream or creek). In 1714, Dutch immigrants settled in the area. The village of Fishkill was a significant crossroads in the overland transportation network in the 18th and 19th centuries. The Queen's Highway, connecting Albany to New York City, intersected with a major overland route from New England to the Hudson River. Among the first to occupy the land now within the village limits were Johannes Ter Boss and Henry Rosecrance.

During the American Revolution printer Samuel Loudon fled from New York City during the British occupation of that city and set up a post office in Fishkill, which became the first post office in New York state. Here Loudon also continued printing a revolutionary newspaper called, The New York Packet and The American Advertiser which he founded while in New York City.

The third New York Provincial Congress convened in Fishkill in May 1776. Fishkill became part of one of the largest colonial military encampments during the Revolutionary War. General Washington's aide-de-camp Alexander Hamilton took residence here. The Trinity Church, on Hopewell Avenue in the village, was organized in 1756 and the structure built in 1760. It was used as a hospital during the Revolutionary War. The Dutch Reformed church was used as a military prison. American spy Enoch Crosby was held there briefly with Loyalist recruits before being allowed to escape.

In 1871, construction began for a schoolhouse on Church Street. The site used for the schoolhouse belonged to the Fishkill Reformed Church and was formerly used as pasture land for the pastor's cow. In 1876, a great fire destroyed many of the old wooden buildings, which were then replaced by brick ones.

In 1996, the animal rights group PETA (led by the organization's president at the time, Jack Earnhardt) suggested the town (and, presumably, the village, as well) change its name to something less suggestive of violence toward fish. The town declined this change because the name is not meant to suggest violence but instead comes from the Dutch who originally settled the land in which "kil" means "creek". Various other communities also contain the word "Kill" with various prefixes, and a creek in the Catskills called Beaver Kill is a tributary of the Delaware River. Both "Catskill" and "Beaver Kill" could be considered to promote animal violence when their names are improperly understood. This led then-mayor George Carter to joke that if Fishkill is renamed, the Catskills should also be renamed, presumably to the Catsave Mountains.

== Geography ==
According to the United States Census Bureau, the village has a total area of 2.3 square kilometres (0.89 sq mi), all land. The village population was 2,171 at the 2010 census.

== Demographics ==
Historical population
| Census | Pop. | Note | %± |
|---|---|---|---|
| 1870 | 737 | | — |
| 1880 | 682 | | −7.5% |
| 1890 | 745 | | 9.2% |
| 1900 | 589 | | −20.9% |
| 1910 | 516 | | −12.4% |
| 1920 | 479 | | −7.2% |
| 1930 | 553 | | 15.4% |
| 1940 | 720 | | 30.2% |
| 1950 | 841 | | 16.8% |
| 1960 | 1,033 | | 22.8% |
| 1970 | 913 | | −11.6% |
| 1980 | 1,555 | | 70.3% |
| 1990 | 1,957 | | 25.9% |
| 2000 | 1,735 | | −11.3% |
| 2010 | 2,171 | | 25.1% |
| 2020 | 2,166 | | −0.2% |
U.S. Decennial Census

=== 2020 census ===
As of the 2020 census, Fishkill had a population of 2,166. The median age was 44.5 years. 17.1% of residents were under the age of 18, and 20.2% were 65 years of age or older. For every 100 females, there were 86.7 males, and for every 100 females age 18 and over, there were 82.0 males age 18 and over.

100.0% of residents lived in urban areas, while 0.0% lived in rural areas.

There were 1,094 households in Fishkill, of which 22.8% had children under the age of 18 living in them. Of all households, 35.2% were married-couple households, 20.6% were households with a male householder and no spouse or partner present, and 36.9% were households with a female householder and no spouse or partner present. About 42.2% of all households were made up of individuals, and 16.3% had someone living alone who was 65 years of age or older.

There were 1,165 housing units, of which 6.1% were vacant. The homeowner vacancy rate was 0.0%, and the rental vacancy rate was 6.1%.

Racial composition as of the 2020 census
| Race | Number | Percent |
|---|---|---|
| White | 1,520 | 70.2% |
| Black or African American | 196 | 9.0% |
| American Indian and Alaska Native | 15 | 0.7% |
| Asian | 91 | 4.2% |
| Native Hawaiian and Other Pacific Islander | 0 | 0.0% |
| Some other race | 163 | 7.5% |
| Two or more races | 181 | 8.4% |
| Hispanic or Latino (of any race) | 324 | 15.0% |

=== 2000 census ===
At the 2000 census, there were 1,735 people, 965 households, and 400 families in the village. The population density was 1,978.8 inhabitants per square mile (764.0/km^{2}). There were 1,011 housing units at an average density of 443.6 /km^{2} (1,153.0 /sq mi). The racial makeup of the village was 93.72% White, 2.77% African American, 0.17% Native American, 1.15% Asian, 0.06% Pacific Islander, 1.27% from other races, and 0.86% from two or more races. 6.05% of the population were Hispanic or Latino of any race. 22.9% were of Italian, 20.2% Irish, 11.2% German, 7.3% American and 5.4% English ancestry according to Census 2000.

Of the 965 households, 14.1% had children under the age of 18 living with them, 32.2% were married couples living together, 6.9% have a woman whose husband does not live with her, and 58.5% were non-families. 53.9% of households were one person and 32.8% were one person aged 65 or older. The average household size was 1.80 and the average family size was 2.74.

The age distribution was 14.1% under the age of 18, 4.9% from 18 to 24, 26.9% from 25 to 44, 23.5% from 45 to 64, and 30.5% 65 or older. The median age was 48 years. For every 100 females, there were 74.5 males. For every 100 females age 18 and over, there were 71.3 males.

The median household income was US$36,344 and the median family income was US$59,737. Males had a median income of US$48,750 versus US$31,898 for females. The per capita income for the village was US$26,504. 8.4% of the population and 4.5% of families were below the poverty line. Out of the total people living in poverty, 8.8% are under the age of 18 and 8.9% are 65 or older.

Property value is based on purchase price of properties in the area instead of actual land value causing higher property taxes to existing and new home owners.

== Transportation ==
U.S. Route 9 leads north 5 miles (8 km) to Wappingers Falls, north 12 miles (19 km) to Poughkeepsie, and south 19 miles (31 km) to Peekskill. New York State Route 52 leads west 5 miles (8 km) to Beacon and east 7 miles (11 km) to the Taconic State Parkway in East Fishkill. Interstate 84 passes 1 mile (1.6 km) south of the village, with access from Exit 44 (NY 52 southwest of the village) and Exit 46 (US 9 south of the village). Via I-84 it is 7 miles (11 km) west to Newburgh across the Hudson River and 31 miles (50 km) southeast to Danbury, Connecticut. New York City is 70 miles (110 km) to the south via the Taconic Parkway or New York State Thruway.

Fishkill is served by the bus routes "A", "B", and "F", operated by Dutchess County Public Transit.

== Economy ==
The largest employer in the village is Gap Inc. with a distribution center opened in 2000. In 2014, the company announced plans to add 1,200 jobs over a 5-year period and invest US$96 million. In August 2016, a massive fire damaged the facility. 600 employees were safely evacuated from the facility on Merritt Boulevard just before 23:00 EDT, when the fire appeared to have started on the second floor and quickly spread. The warehouse reopened in 2018.

== Notable people ==
- William J. Hutchins (1813–1884), a successful businessman and one-time mayor of Houston, Texas, was born in Fishkill.
- Charlie W. Ramone (1954–1974), a musician and the first guitarist for American Punk Band Ramones, was born in Fishkill.
- Louis Mayer (sculptor) (1869-1969), a painter and sculptor in bronze, had a property and studio named "Joyous Mountain" in Fishkill.
