= Samuel Loudon =

Colonial American printer and postmaster

- Born: 1727; Ireland or Scotland (Note: Historical accounts vary: See Early life and family section)
- Died: 1813 (aged 85–86); Middletown Township, New Jersey, US
- Occupations: Printer, postmaster
- Spouse(s): Sarah Oakes, 1756; Lydia Griswold, 1768
- Children: five sons and three daughters

Signature
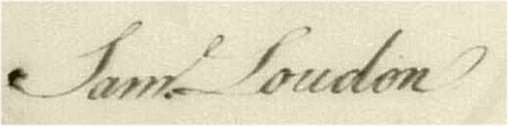

Notes
- • Signature taken from correspondence from Samuel Loudon to George Washington, April 12, 1781

Samuel Loudon (1727–1813) was a colonial American printer, publisher and merchant who emigrated from Ireland some time prior to 1753. Loudon founded The New-York Packet and The American Advertiser and became the postmaster at New York State's first post office in Fishkill, New York. During the American Revolution he became the official printer of New York State and printed its first Constitution, laws, acts and other official documents, while also taking on some private commissions. Before and during the Revolution Loudon became active through the use of his newspapers promoting the cause for American independence, and for freedom of the press. After the war Loudon printed the Laws of the City of New York, and later promoted ratification of the proposed Constitution by publishing selected essays of The Federalist Papers in his newspaper.

== Early life and family ==
Loudon was of Scotch-Irish ancestry and emigrated to the America colonies before 1753. Historical accounts, however, vary on his actual place of birth, maintaining he was born either in Ireland or in Scotland, while some accounts express uncertainty. In October 1753 he owned and operated a general store on Water Street near the Old Slip Market in New York City, where he sold an assortment of wares, including powder and shot, pots and kettles, and a variety of ready-made coats and breeches, in the latest fashions. After four years he moved the location of his store to Hunter's Quay and began operating as a ship chandler, selling supplies for ships.

Loudon was married twice: On January 24, 1756, he married Sarah Oakes. Sometime before 1768 he married Lydia Griswold, the sister of Matthew Griswold the Governor of Connecticut. Loudon had five sons and three daughters. Lydia died at the age of 46 on June 11, 1788.

== Printing career ==
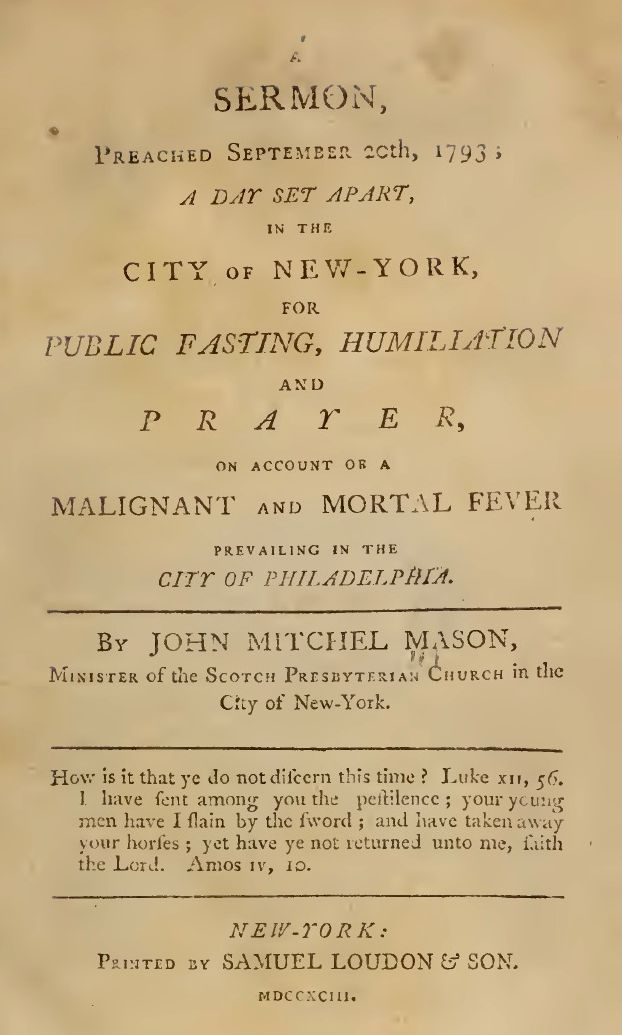
Sermon written by John Mason, printed by Samuel Loudon in New York, 1793

In 1772 (Note: Malone fixes the date of the bookstore's opening at 1771.) Loudon opened a bookshop on Hunter's Quay and sold pamphlets and books printed for him by Frederick Shoeber and Thomas Hodge who operated a printing firm in New York. (Note: One such example can be viewed here) Loudon entered into his printing career in 1775 when he bought interest in the business of Hodge and Shober, after Shoeber bought out his partner. Loudon and Shober formed a partnership in the printing firm now called Shober & Loudon. Before the end of the same year Shober became apprehensive of the growing hostilities between England and her colonies and subsequently the firm only lasted several months when Shober sold his share of the business to Loudon, who became sole owner of the firm. During the American Revolution and thereafter there were only a few booksellers still in operation in New York City. While there were a number of bookshops that came and went in New York, only Samuel Loudon and Hugh Gaine continued to run their book shops by the turn of the century.

=== American Revolution ===
Politically, Loudon was a staunch Whig and patriot before and during the American Revolution. He was awarded a contract for the official printer for the state and printed orders and other documents for the Continental Army. Loudon, though a devoted Presbyterian and committed Republican, began printing a pamphlet written by Bishop Charles Inglis in March 1776 that was highly critical of another pamphlet entitled Common Sense, which was written by Thomas Paine. Paine's popular but controversial work was highly critical of the British Crown, Parliament and their dealings with the colonies, and strongly advocated the rebellion and the cause for American independence. Paine's work became one of the most influential works prior to the revolution. Inglis's critical pamphlet of this work was entitled The Deceiver Unmasked; or Loyalty and Interest United. Various people in New York's extralegal committees warned Loudon against printing the incitetful pamphlet. As a printer who strongly supported the ideal of free speech, however, Loudon saw nothing inconsistent with his advocacy and support for American independence by publishing a Loyalist tract criticizing Paine's work. Loudon had announced publication of The Deceiver' in several newspapers. This action caused him to fall into disfavor with the Sons of Liberty (Note: Also referred to as The Committee of Mechanics.) in the city. Loudon's fellow Whigs were surprised and alarmed at his action and subsequently a meeting was called where the concerned parties met. After voicing their disapproval with one another, and while drinking rum during the session, Alexander McDougall, and others, set out to Loudon's house on March 19, forced their way in, pulled Loudon out of his bed, and seized and destroyed the whole original manuscript and carried off and burned 1,500 impressions of the controversial editorial. (Note: One pamphlet survived and is housed at the New York Historical Society, with an added inscription which reads, "This copy was saved.") In response Loudon, who had invested time and money into the printing, and though a strong advocate of American independence, strongly asserted his patriotism and voiced his resentment to it being challenged in an open letter, "To the Public", which he published in the April 11, 1976 issue of his New York Packet. Loudon exclaimed that an affront to the freedom of the press had been committed, and at a time when the question of independence was still an open question.

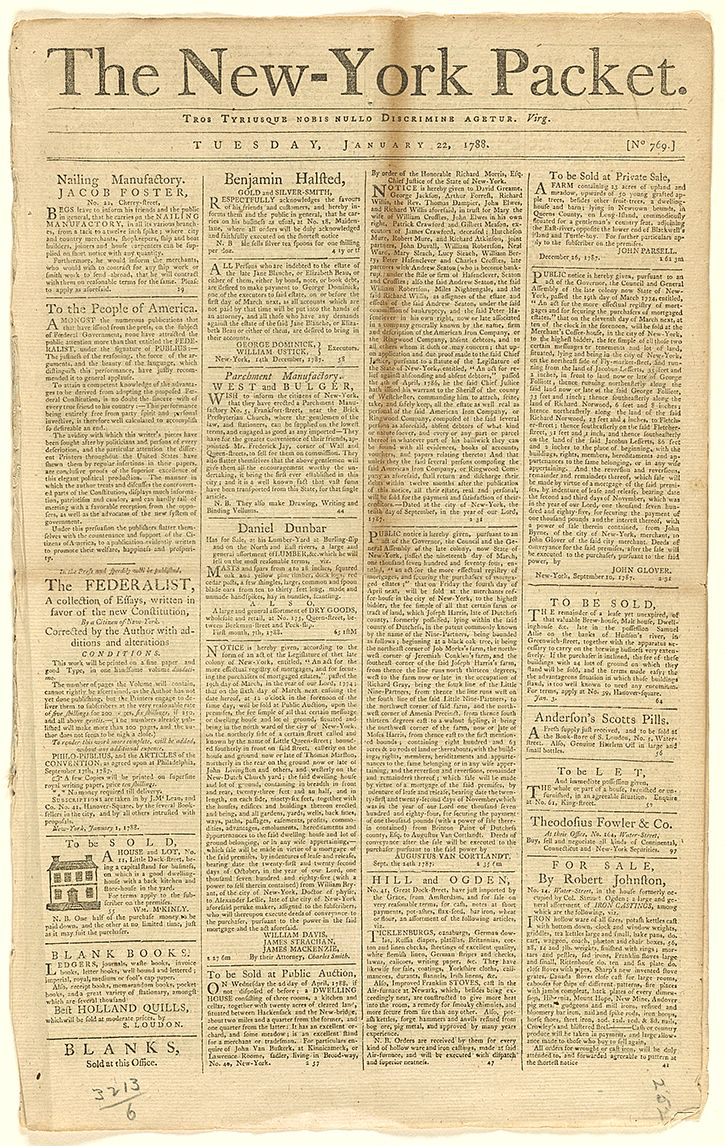
The New-York Packet and The American Advertiser, founded and printed by Samuel Loudon.

==== Founding of The New York Packet ====
Loudon founded and published a newspaper in New York City, The New-York Packet and The American Advertiser, on January 4, 1776, which he had printed on Thursday mornings. The newspaper was largely devoted to the cause for American independence. The heading of the newspaper had an imprint which read: "Printed by Samuel Loudon, in Water-Street, between the Coffee-House and the Old Slip."

British forces arrived at New York City in August 1776. As the war unfolded and British troops also began to occupy various cites along the east coast, many printers were forced to pack up shop and relocate if they wished to save their printing presses and continue printing articles advocating the revolutionary cause. (Note: Along with Loudon, printers such as Benjamin Edes, founder of The Boston Gazette, fled Boston to Watertown. Isaiah Thomas, took his Massachusetts Spy from Boston to Worcester. Solomon Southwick removed his Newport Mercury to Attlebury, while John Dunlap took his Pennsylvania Packet from Philadelphia to Lancaster.) As a result of the war paper for printing was often difficult to acquire and sometimes caused delays in Loudon's newspaper publication.

Loudon suspended publication of The New-York Packet on August 29, 1776, and fled New York City, and moved his large family and printing press first to Norwich, Connecticut just before the British entered the city. Once in the city British forces confiscated the printing press of Hugh Gaine. While in Norwich he was a merchant for a short time and then moved to Fishkill, New York, where he opened a store and print shop. During the war Fishkill was the location of the largest supply depot for the American army. He took on the responsibility of becoming the local postmaster as part of the duties of a printer, where he managed the handling of mail and decided on the various postal routes. At that time in America it was not unusual for a printer to also be a postmaster. He resumed publication of The New-York Packet on January 16, 1777.

In 1779 The Supreme Executive Council of Pennsylvania procured a subscription to London's New York Packet, and Secretary Mallack wrote to have it dispatched on a regular basis, "in order to have the files compleat" to which Loudon replied as follows :

FIshkill, 25th Feby. 1779.
Sir, Agreeable to your desire the paper shall be sent to you. I have published but few papers for
the past three months, owing to scarcity of Paper, but now have a parcel on the way hither and
in two weeks shall begin to forward them to you. I am sr
Your h'ble serv't
SAM LOUDON.

==== Establishes post office in Fishkill ====
Articles from the State of New York American Revolution Bicentennial Commission show that Fishkill became the first post office in New York state after the Americans took over the former British system in July 1776. Fishkill then was considered the post office for the State of New York, and there were only eight post offices in the thirteen states. That post office was at the Isaac Van Wyck house on the Albany Post Road, where Loudon also published his newspaper. He did not tell his readers about the situation at the Fishkill Post Office in the Revolutionary War years when the little hamlet was a supply depot for American troops, and a meeting place for generals, or that it was the first New York State post office.

A ledger of Postmaster General Benjamin Franklin notes that the revenue raised by two of the thirteen post offices for the first report period under the Americans on July 28, 1777. The post offices were at Fishkill and Fredericksburg, Virginia. The report shows Flshkill's revenue in that period was 1,237 pounds, 7 shillings and 8 pence, while the same period showed Fredericksburg's post office had a revenue of 62 pounds, 8 shillings and 9 pence. (Note: The value of the pound in those days for 1,237 pounds would have been about $7,500. The Fredericksburg revenue accordingly would have been worth no more than $400. At the time payment for postal service was made upon delivery and the average citizen could not afford to receive a letter. An exception was if a letter came from an American soldier and marked that it was free of charge because it was official and had special privilege.)

Loudon's printing shop in Fishkill became of great service to the Continental Congress and various statesmen during the Revolutionary War. Loudon's newspaper featured various congressional resolutions that were enacted from time to time. In 1776 he printed "An Address of the Convention of the Representatives of the State of New York", dated December 23, 1776, from Abraham Ten Broeck (Note: Ten Broeck was Commander of Ten Broeck's Brigade in the New York Militia during the Revolutionary War.) to their constituents. Printings of the manuscript copy of Broeck's address were also forwarded to the Continental Congress on December 28, with notice that they had intended to have it translated into German.

In a letter dated January 25, 1779, Major General Alexander McDougall submitted a letter to George Washington informing him of his orders for permits of provisions for his troops, and his proposed regulations of military prizes, requesting Washington's approval. Along with the letter, McDougall had enclosed copies of the orders, and also had them printed and published by Loudon on a two-page broadside in Loudon's newspaper when he was in Fishkill.

==== Correspondence with Washington ====
During the Revolution, Fishkill was the site of Washington's headquarters and a large supply base, which supplied the northern department of the Continental Army, who were stationed there to prevent the British from advancing north from New York City. While at Fishkill, Loudon corresponded with George Washington in the early 1780s over matters concerning supply stations for the American troops, and post riders and the mail sent to and from Washington. In 1781, Washington dispatched a letter to Loudon, dated July 10, requesting that Loudon publish a proclamation in his "useful newspaper", The New York Packet, informing the inhabitants of the Fishkill area that his army thereabouts "remains in its present Position, from Day Break till Noon", and that two market places will be open to aid in the supply of that army. The proclamation also assured that, "All Persons, who will bring any Articles of Provisions & Small Supplies for the Use of the Army..." would be protected from any subsequent repercussions that might result from their aid to the American army.

In a letter dated July 30, 1782, Loudon informed Washington that he had been alerted by Ebenezer Hazard, postmaster in Philadelphia, that he had erroneously dispatched three letters from Washington intended for "Gentlemen in New Jersey", in with the mail sent to Philadelphia, and that along the post road his letters, and along with the rest of the mail, were intercepted by the British. Accepting full responsibility, Loudon had asked for Washington's understanding and pardon over the matter, along with an explanation from Loudon that such an oversight had never happened before, and with his assurances that this would never occur again.

==== Victory at Yorktown ====
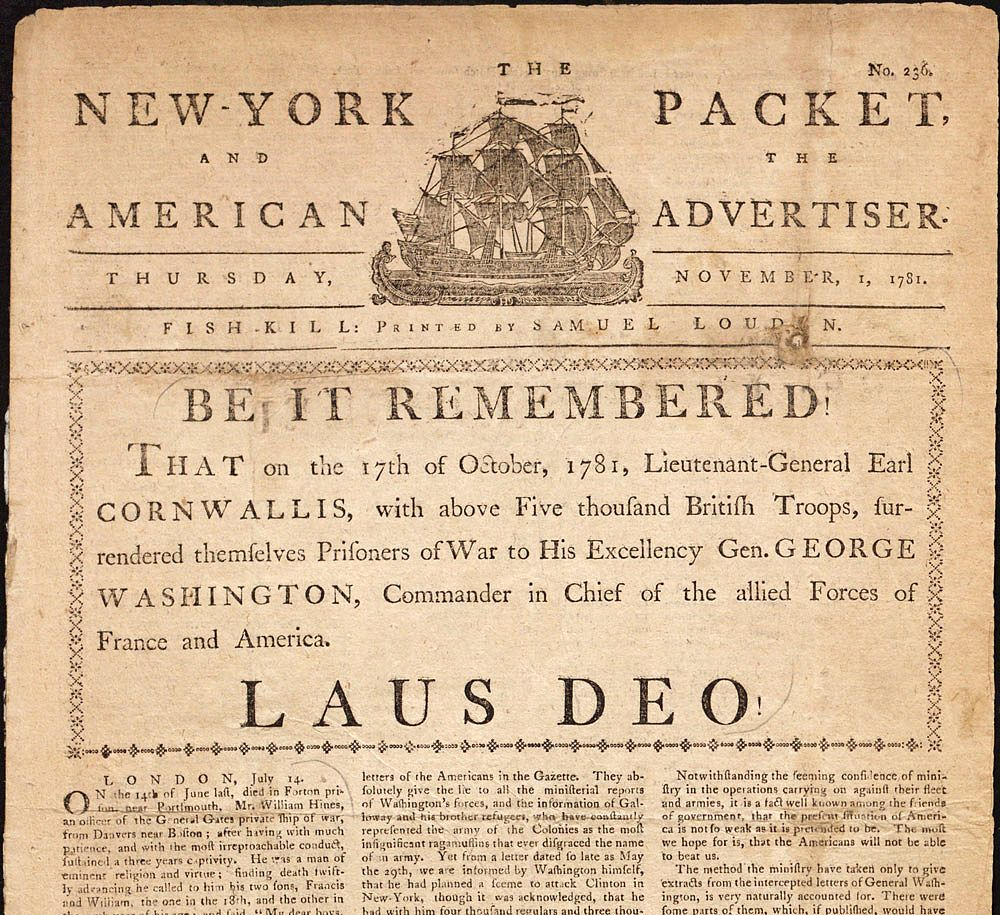
The New York Packet, November 1, 1781, issue

The Siege of Yorktown transpired over a period of more than three weeks, culminating in a victory for General Washington and his French allies, and the surrender of General Cornwallis in Yorktown, Virginia. During this time various newspapers covered the siege, along with giving thanks and praise to Washington for his victory. Several newspapers carried the same exact proclamation, with ornamental framing, in the headings, including Loudon's New York Packet and the American Advertiser. Ten days after Cornwallis' surrender Loudon featured the event in celebratory tones on the front page of the November 1, 1781 issue of The Packet. Just below the heading the Latin phrase LAUS DEO was inscribed in large bold letters, meaning "Praise be to God".

=== Post revolution ===
Loudon returned to New York City after the British had surrendered and evacuated the city in August 1783. He reestablished The New-York Packet and his popular circulating library of pre-war days when he was a bookseller and librarian. In the July 11 issue of his newspaper he had devoted an entire page to the printing of The Declaration of Independence. Loudon had it printed using a large font and framed it with decorations. It became the most elaborate printing of any government document. As the State Printer he printed New York's first Constitution in 1777 and after the revolution printed the "Laws of the State of New York" in 1786. He also printed Noah Webster's American Magazine for 1787–1788.

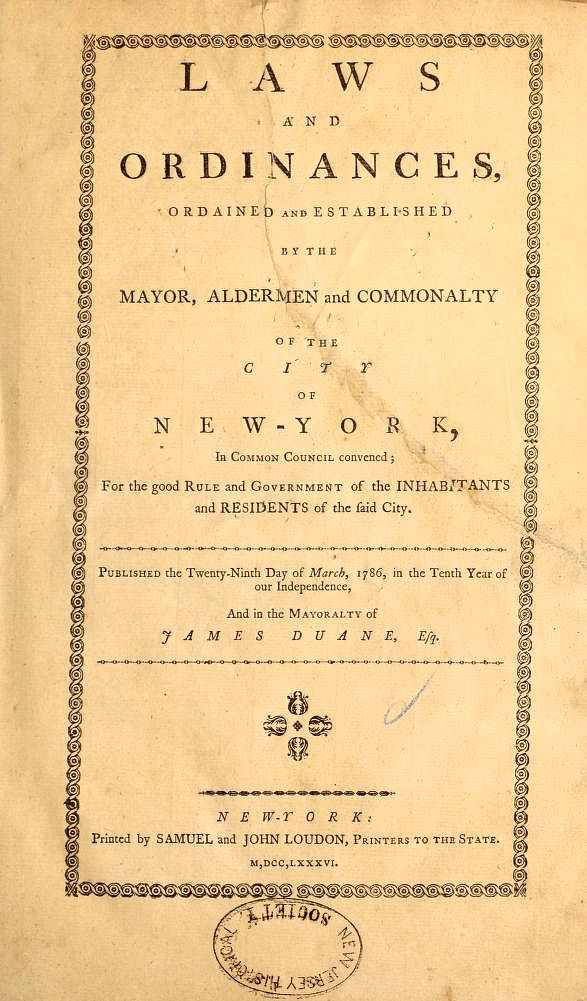
Laws and Ordinances of New York state, 1786.

In 1783 Loudon printed the famous Newburgh letter (Note: The Newburgh letter of May 22, 1782, was sent to George Washington and written by Colonel Lewis Nicola for the army officers camped at Newburgh, which proposed the idea that of Washington as King of the United States, a prospect that Washington was dead set against.) in with a pamphlet called A Collection of Papers relating to Half Pay to the Officers of the Army, which he had reprinted several times. In 1784 Loudon printed and published Letters from Phocion by Alexander Hamilton, who wrote under the assumed name of Phocion. Hamilton's letters criticized the way in which Loyalists after the war were treated in New York State.

Loudon as a merchant used his New York City print shop as a consignment store. The sale of personal property on commission was a common practice by Loudon. On September 20, 1784, he printed the following advertisement in The New York Packet and The American Advertiser": "German Flutes of a superior Quality to be sold at this Printing-office." The advertisement for the sale of John Jacob Astor's musical instruments was periodically published by Loudon in his newspaper to March 10, 1785.

In 1784 Loudon printed and published a twenty-eight page tract, entitled A Letter from -- (Note: This space left empty to indicate the writer was anonymous. See title page.) in London, to his friend in America, on the subject of the slave trade : .... It was written by an anonymous writer in London, which castigated the practice of slavery and the slave trade in the American colonies. Beginning in 1785 Loudon became an active member of New York's Saint Andrew Society and for many years was an elder of the Scotch Presbyterian Church on Cedar Street. He was also an honorary member of the Society of the Cincinnati.

Loudon published in 1786 the Laws of the City of New York, and another edition of the City Charter granted by Grovenor Montgomerie. In 1787 he took his son, John Loudon, into partnership, to form Loudon and Son. In 1792 Loudon retired from the business. In February 1792, Loudon, with his son, started publication of The Diary or Loudon's Register, which was issued daily, but its publication was short lived. Loudon was commissioned in 1793 by Edmond-Charles Genêt, who had obtained asylum in American during the French Revolution, to print various letters he had written to George Washington and Thomas Jefferson in the Loudon's Register. (Note: Genet was appealing to Washington and Jefferson for their political support towards what he felt were affronts to French liberties during the French Revolution.) Loudon's Register also covered the events and public and political opinions surrounding the Whiskey Rebellion which ended in 1794.

In 1793 a yellow fever epidemic broke out in Philadelphia, which affected nearly everyone in that city. Not understanding its cause and knowing no other recourse, Presbyterian minister John Mitchell Mason commissioned Loudon, though retired, to print a sermon he had written, which was read in New York on a day set aside for public fasting and prayer for the people in Philadelphia.

==== Publication of The Federalist Papers ====
The idea for the need of a strong federal government to unify the newly established states was promoted in the 1780s by Alexander Hamilton, James Madison, John Jay and other members of the Federalist Party in a series of eighty-five essays in support of the ratification of the United States Constitution, commonly referred to as The Federalist Papers. (Note: Each edition of the Federalist Papers were addressed to the voters of New York, asserted the importance of supporting the Constitution, and were published under the assumed name of Publius.) Loudon sided with the Federalists and his newspaper, The New York Packet and American Advertiser, was one of four New York newspapers initially chosen to publish the federalist essays. (Note: The four newspapers were The New-York Packet and American Advertiser, printed and published by Samuel and John London; The Independent Journal, or The General Advertiser, by John McLean; The Daily Advertiser, by Francis Childs; The New York Journal and Daily Patriotic Register, by Thomas & Greenleaf.) They were published beginning October 27, 1787 until August 1788, during the ratification sessions. Accordingly, selected essays appeared in the various issues of Loudon's The New York Packet during this time period. Their publications were met with mixed public reaction, and also resulted in an editor war among many of the newspapers of the time. Hamilton wrote many of the Federalist essays in haste under great pressure. Loudon was one of the few people that knew Hamilton was writing under the assumed name of Publius. Hamilton's lifelong friend Robert Troup once noted Loudon in Hamilton's study waiting to take numbers of the Federalist as quickly as Hamilton turned them out, so they could be printed directly in the next issue of Loudon's New York Packet. The Packet proved to be a pro-federalist newspaper inasmuch as the essays it featured advocated ratification of the proposed Constitution and written for a newspaper readership which included editorial comment from Hamilton.

==== Government printing contracts ====
After the United States Constitution was ratified on June 21, 1788, the competition over the public printing contract for the newly established government became stringent among the leading printers in New York. Along with Samuel Loudon, there was Francis Childs, Thomas Greenleaf, Archibald McLean, and John Fenno who all submitted petitions for this important contract. In a letter of May 22, 1789 Loudon wrote to Alexander Hamilton and outlined what he felt were his advantages over the other printers and why he should be awarded the contract. His letter reminded Hamilton "for the sole reason, because I took sides with the Federalists, I had been told during last summer, that I would have the printing business for that very reason." His letter also pointed out that he had the largest print shop in the city and that he had experience in this field as a former official printer for the state of New York. Beginning in 1789, however, Francis Childs and John Swaine were awarded contracts for printing the laws and various official documents for the United States Government, including the Standing Rules and Orders of the House of Representatives, 1789 and the Acts Passed at the First Congress, 1789.

== Final years and legacy ==
On February 24, 1813, Loudon died in Middletown Township, New Jersey, at the age of eighty-six. The Fishkill Historical Society invited the public to a dedication to the memory of Loudon that was held Saturday morning, October 11, 2014, and unveiled a new historic marker that was placed at the corner of 17 Old Main St. and Loudon Drive. The plaque was erected near the location of Loudon's Revolutionary War print shop where he had served as the first postmaster for the state of New York from 1776 to 1783, when Fishkill was the only post office in that state.

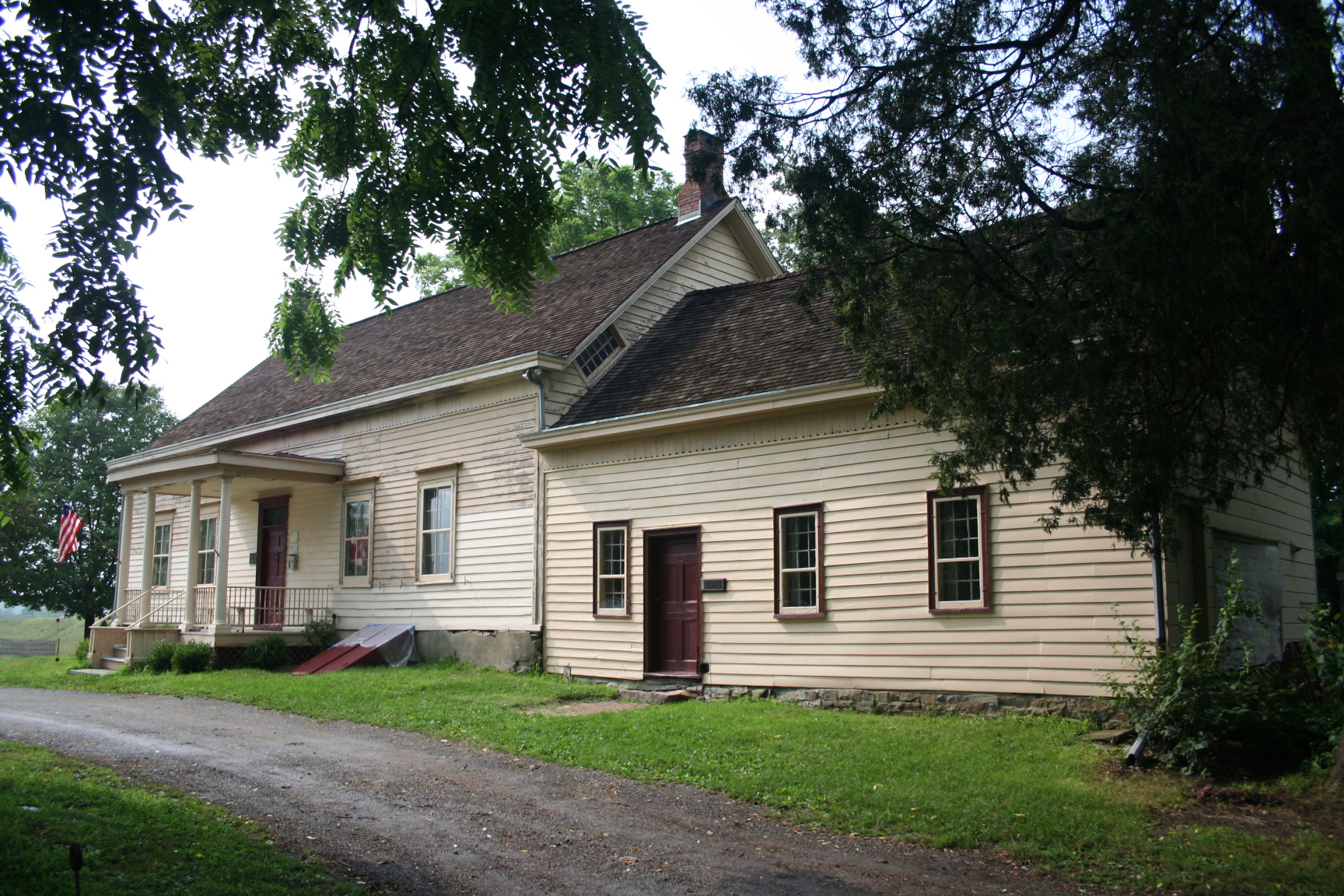
Isaac Van Wyck house, site of first N. Y. Post Office and Loudon's printing shop

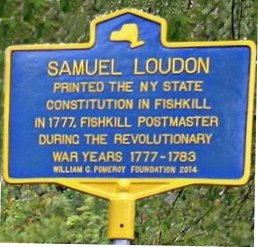
Loudon historical marker, in Fishkill, N.Y.

== See also ==
- List of early American publishers and printers
- History of American newspapers
- History of printing

== Bibliography ==
- Adair, Douglass (April 1944). "The Authorship of the Disputed Federalist Papers: Part I". The William and Mary Quarterly. 1 (2). Omohundro Institute of Early American History and Culture: 97–122. doi:10.2307/1921883. JSTOR 1921883.
- Bowman, John Stewart (1995). The Cambridge dictionary of American biography. Cambridge; New York : Cambridge University Press. ISBN 978-0-521-40258-3.
- Chernow, Ron (2005). Alexander Hamilton. New York : Penguin Press. ISBN 978-0-14-303475-9.
- Childs, James B. (1962). "Disappeared in the Wings of Oblivion": The Story of the United States House of Representatives Printed Documents at the First Session of the First Congress, New York, 1789". The Papers of the Bibliographical Society of America. 58 (2). The University of Chicago Press: 91–132. doi:10.1086/pbsa.58.2.24300895. JSTOR 24300895. S2CID 159967468.
- Chopra, Ruma (Fall 2009). "Printer Hugh Gaine Crosses and Re-Crosses the Hudson". New York History. 90 (Fall 2009). Cornell University Press: 271–285. JSTOR 23185129.
- Coenen, Dan T. (November 2006). "A Rhetoric for Ratification: The Argument of "The Federalist" and Its Impact on Constitutional Interpretation". Duke Law Journal. 56 (2). Duke University School of Law: 469–543. JSTOR 40040551.
- Curran, Jonathan (2018). "Examining Public Opinion during the Whiskey Rebellion". Journal of the American Revolution.
- Encyclopedia Britannica (2007). Founding Fathers: The Essential Guide to the Men Who Made America. John Wiley & Sons. ISBN 978-0-470-11792-7.
- Freeman, Douglas Southall (1952) [1948]. George Washington. Vol. V. Charles Scribner's Sons. - Google link
- Hamilton, Alexander; Madison, James; Jay, John (2009) [1787-1788]. Widger, David (ed.). The Federalist Papers: The Importance of the Union. The Constitution Society.
- Hildeburn, Charles S. (1895). Sketches of printers and printing in colonial New York. New York: Dodd, Mead, & Company.
- Hoffman, Edwin D. (January 1949). "The Bookshops of New York City, 1743–1948". New York History. 30 (1): 53–65. JSTOR 23149646.
- Lee, James Melvin (1923). History of American journalism. Boston, New York, Houghton Mifflin Company. ( Alternative publication )
- Mason, John M. (1793). Loudon, Samuel (ed.). Sermon, preached September 20th, 1793. Samuel Loudon & Son.
- Anonymous (1784). Letter from -- in London to his friend in America, on the subject of the slave trade : ... New York: Samuel Loudon.
- Malone, Dumas (1935). Dictionary Of American Biography. Charles Scribner's Sons.
- Thomas, Isaiah (1874). The history of printing in America, with a biography of printers. Vol. I. New York, B. Franklin.
- —— (1874). The history of printing in America, with a biography of printers. Vol. II. New York, B. Franklin.
- Wall, Alexander James (1922). Samuel Loudon (1727–1813), Merchant, Printer and Patriot: With Some of His Letters. New-York Historical Society.
- Wroth, Lawrence C. (1938). The Colonial Printer. Portland, Me., The Southworth-Anthoensen press.
- "Samuel Loudon". Pomeroy Foundation. December 19, 2018.
- "To George Washington from Major General Alexander McDougall, 25 January 1779". National Archives: Founders on line.
- Nicola, Lewis. "To George Washington from Lewis Nicola, 22 May 1782,". Letter to George Washington. U.S. National Archives.
- Washington, George. "To Lewis Nicola from George Washington, 22 May 1782,". Letter to Lewis Nicola. U.S. National Archives.
- Hamilton, Alexander (1784). "A Letter from Phocion to the Considerate Citizens of New York, 1-27-1784". National Archives: founders online.
- "To George Washington from Edmond Charles Genet, 13 August 1793". National Archives: Founders Online.
- Broeck, Abraham Ten (December 23, 1776). "Final version of an Address of the convention of the Representatives of the State of New York to their Constituents, 23 December 1776". Samuel Loudon; National Archives; Founders online.
- "To George Washington from Samuel loudon, 30 July, 1782". Letter to. National Archives: Founders Online. July 30, 1782.
- Washington, George (July 10, 1781). "From George Washington to Samuel loudon, 10 July 1781". Letter to. National Archives: Founders Online.
- Loudon, Samuel (1789). "To Alexander Hamilton from Samuel Loudon, 22 May 1789". Letter to. National Archives: Founders Online.
- Thomas, Heather C. (2019). "Federalist Essays in Historic Newspapers". Library of Congress.
- Childs, Francis; Swaine, John (1789). "Additional standing rules and orders of the House of representatives". Library of Congress.
- Childs, Francis; Swaine, John (1789). "ACTS PASSED AT THE FIRST CONGRESS & other publications by Francis Childs & John Swaine". Statutes and Stories.
- "Fishkill Post Office State's First". Poughkeepsie Journal. Poughkeepsie, New York. July 4, 1976. p. 37 – via Newspapers.com.
- "Do You Know". Poughkeepsi Journal. Poughkeepsi, New York. July 26, 1974. p. 12 – via Newspapers.com.
- "Revolutionary memorial to be dedicated in Fishkill". Poughkeepsie Journal. Poughkeepsie, New York. October 7, 2014. p. A6 – via Newspapers.com.
- "Fishkill". Poughkeepsie Journal. Butler, Pennsylvania. June 12, 1977. p. 8C – via Newspapers.com.
- "Beacon Light Hotel was a popular getaway". Poughkeepsie Journal. Poughkeepsie, New York. November 7, 2018. p. A3 – via Newspapers.com.
- "State Is 200 Years Old". The Daily Messenger. Canandaigue, New York. April 27, 1977. p. 6 – via Newspapers.com.
- "Hartford, June 16 (1788)". Hartford Courant. Hartford, Connecticut. June 16, 1788. p. 3 – via Newspapers.com.
- "The Astor Family in New York". Butler Citizen. Butler, Pennsylvania. April 5, 1876. p. 1 – via Newspapers.com.
- "Be it remembered". The New York Packet. Fishkill, New York. November 1, 1781.
- "Be it remembered". Freeman's Journal, or, The American Intelligencer. October 24, 1781.
