= John M. Mason (theologian) =

American preacher and theologian

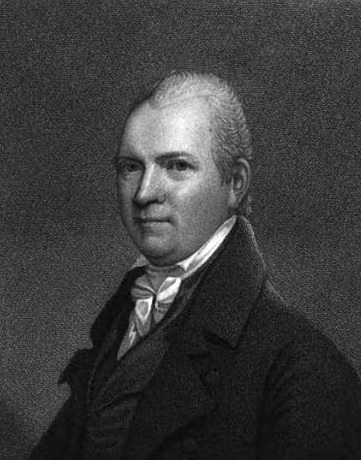
John M. Mason

John Mitchell Mason (March 19, 1770 – December 26, 1829) was an American preacher and theologian who was Provost of Columbia College in the early 1810s, and briefly President of Dickinson College in Carlisle, Pennsylvania in the early 1820s.

== Biography ==
Born in New York City, Mason was the son of a prominent clergyman. He graduated from Columbia College in May 1789, and in 1791 traveled to his father's home country of Scotland to study theology at the University of Edinburgh.

=== Preaching career ===
Towards the end of 1792, his studies in Edinburgh were interrupted by news of the death of his father, prompting Mason to return to the United States and accept the pastoral charge of the church with which his father was connected, in New York. He was licensed to preach in November, 1792; and, after preaching there for several months, was installed in April, 1793, as their pastor. On May 13, 1793, he married Ann Lefferts, with whom he had five sons and two daughters.

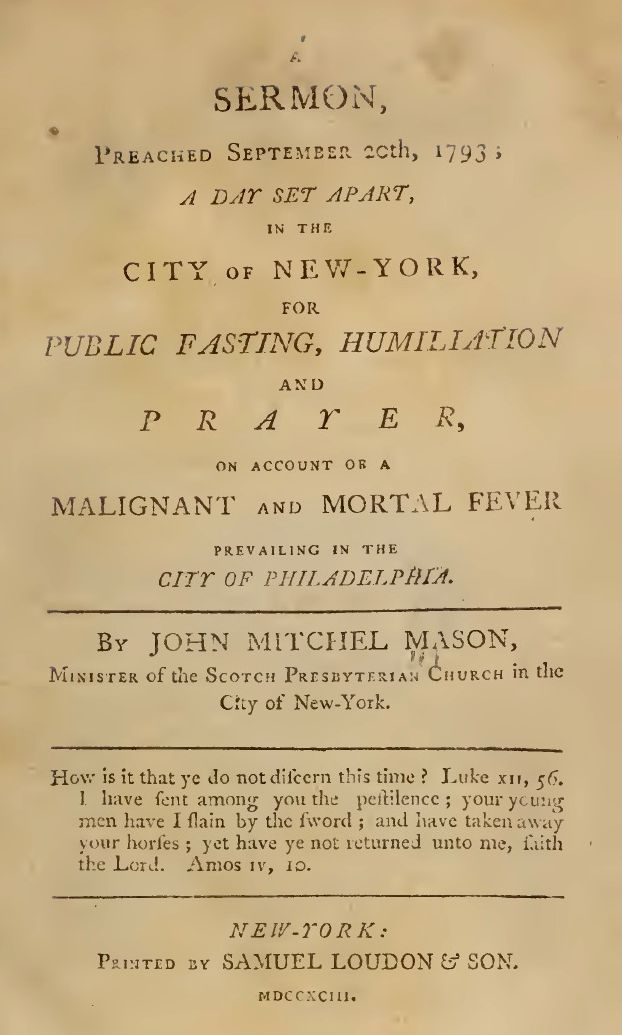
Sermon written by John Mason, printed by Samuel Loudon in New York

In 1793 a yellow fever epidemic broke out in Philadelphia which afflicted nearly everyone in the city in varying degrees. Not understanding its cause, and knowing no other recourse, Mason wrote a sermon and had it printed by Samuel Loudon in his newspaper and then read it in New York on a day that the city set aside for public fasting and prayer for the people of Philadelphia.

Mason continued as pastor of his father's former church for seventeen years, where he developed a reputation as an excellent orator. In 1804, he received a Doctor of Divinity, and from 1806 to 1810, he published Christian Magazine. In 1810, he decided to begin a new congregation, directing the construction of a new church in Murray Street. While the new church was being built, his congregation held their meetings for public worship in the Presbyterian Church in Cedar Street. This caused some discord, as the Presbyterian Church used an unauthorized version of the Psalms. At the meeting of Synod in Philadelphia in the spring of 1811, Mason's alleged delinquency in associating with these Presbyterians led to a formal investigation. Although this was resolved in a conciliatory manner, it was widely discussed within the church, prompting Mason to write a work on Catholic Communion, which appeared about four years after, and which was well received.

=== Provostship and travels in Europe ===
In the summer of 1811, Mason accepted the office of Provost of Columbia College, and in the summer of 1812, the Murray Street Church was ready for occupancy. Mason took up the strenuous duties of running the congregation while continuing to work and teach at the college. He was elected a member of the American Antiquarian Society in 1814. During this period, Mason was a staunch Federalist. In 1816, his health declined to the point that he found it necessary to resign the office he had assumed in connection with the college, and he resolved to try the effect of a voyage to Europe. Mason then traveled extensively in France, Italy, and Switzerland, and then to England, where he arrived in time to attend the anniversary of the British and Foreign Bible Society, where he delivered a well-received address.

In the autumn of 1817, Mason returned to the United States and resumed his pastoral duties. In the summer and autumn of 1819, he experienced, in two instances, a slight paralytic affection. After the second attack, he reluctantly consented to suspend his public labors for six weeks. He thereafter worked without further interruption until February, 1820, when, shortly after reading the portion of Scripture on which he intended to lecture, his recollection failed, his mind became confused, and, bursting into tears, he told the audience that his infirmity prevented him from proceeding. He continued to preach intermittently as his health allowed, finally resigned his pastoral charge on October 25, 1821.

=== President of Dickinson College ===
Prior to his paralytic episodes, he had been invited by the Trustees of Dickinson College in Carlisle, Pennsylvania, to become President of that institution. Believing that this would constitute a reduced workload, and hoping that the change of climate would be favorable to his health, he accepted the appointment. Mason moved to Carlisle and began serving in this office, but quickly realized that his health was inadequate for the job. While Mason was residing in Carlisle, one of his daughters, and then one of his sons, died. Mason transferred his relation from the Associate Reformed Church to the Presbyterian Church, and became a member of the Presbytery of New York, in 1822, as part of a large movement of people doing the same. Mason resigned his office as President of Dickinson College on May 1, 1824, and returned to the city of New York. He withdrew from public life, and gradually lost his faculties, with brief periods of lucidity until his death, in 1829.
