= Louis Meyer (poet) =

Polish-Jewish poet

- Born: Yehuda Leib Meyer; 1796; Sluzhev, Russian Poland
- Died: March 25, 1869 (aged 72–73)
- Writing career
- Language: German, Hebrew

Louis Meyer (Yiddish: יהודה לייב מאיר, romanized: Yehuda Leib Meyer; 1796 – March 25, 1869) was a Polish-Jewish poet and merchant.

Born in the Polish village of Sluzhev, Meyer was sent in 1810 by his father to Berlin, where he prepared himself for a business career, at the same time developing a talent for poetry. In 1816 he returned to Poland, where he established himself in business in Włocławek, but still found ample time to continue his studies and to write German verse. In 1861 he was elected member of the County Assembly, which was, however, dissolved by the Russian administration after the January Uprising.

Meyer's collected writings were published by an anonymous group of friends under the title Hinterlassene deutsche Schriften eines polnischen Juden (Berlin, 1871). The book contains epic and dramatic poetry, pictures from Jewish life, and some aphorisms in prose.

== Partial bibliography ==
- Meyer, Yehuda Leib (14 May 1861). "Shema Yisra'el". Ha-Magid (in Hebrew). 5 (19). Lyck: 101.
- Meyer, Louis (1871). Hinterlassene deutsche Schriften eines polnischen Juden (in German). Berlin: Louis Gerschel.
