= Hesse-Darmstadt (disambiguation) =

Hesse-Darmstadt (German: Hessen-Darmstadt) may refer to:

- Landgraviate of Hesse-Darmstadt (Landgrafschaft Hessen-Darmstadt) (1567–1806), a state of the Holy Roman Empire
- Grand Duchy of Hesse (Großherzogtum Hessen) (1806–1918), formed after the dissolution of the Holy Roman Empire, and later member of the German Confederation and the German Empire
- People's State of Hesse (Volksstaat Hessen) (1918–1945), created after the abolition of the German monarchies following the revolutions of 1918–1919, a state of Germany during the time of the Weimar Republic
