= Louis Mayer (lawyer) =

Monégasque lawyer

- Born: 1868
- Died: 1941
- Occupation: Lawyer

Louis Mayer (1868-1941) was a lawyer from Monaco. He was an advisor to Albert I, Prince of Monaco. He was also the executor of his will. He served on the boards of the Oceanographic Institute, which runs the Oceanographic Museum, and the Institute of Human Paleology.
